= List of solar thermal power stations =

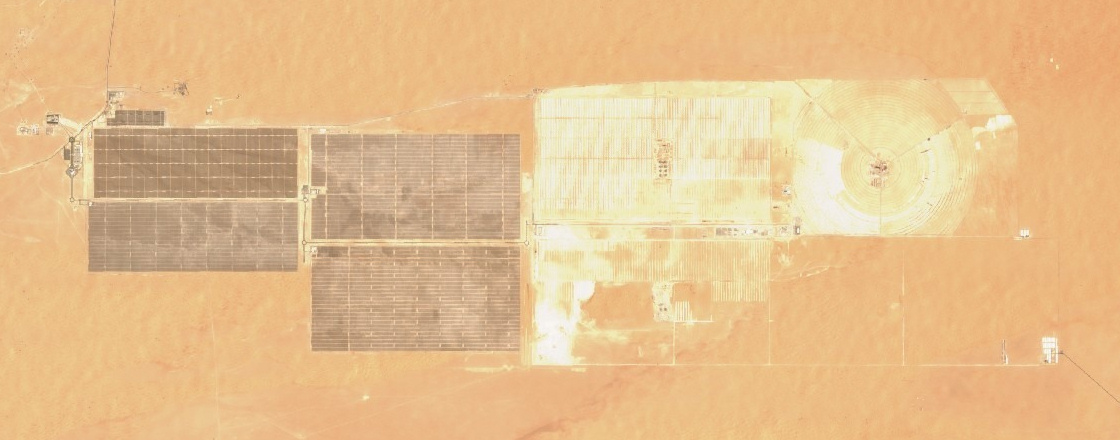
The Mohammed bin Rashid Al Maktoum Solar Park

This is a list of the largest facilities generating electricity through the use of solar thermal power, specifically concentrated solar power.

== Operational ==
Operational solar thermal power stations (of at least 50 MW capacity)
Name	Country	Location	Coordinates	Electrical capacity (MW)	Commissioning	Technology type	Storage hours	Notes and references
Mohammed bin Rashid Al Maktoum Solar Park Phase IV	United Arab Emirates	Dubai	24.7547°N 55.365°E	700	2023	Parabolic trough, as well as solar power tower	15	600 MW parabolic trough and 100MW solar tower commissioned.
Noor / Ouarzazate Solar Power Station	Morocco	Ghassate (Ouarzazate province)	30°59′40″N 6°51′48″W	510		Parabolic trough and solar power tower (Phase 3)	3 / 7 / 7.5	160 MW Phase 1 with 3 hours heat storage. 200 MW phase 2 with 7 hours heat storage is online from January 2018. 150 MW (Phase 3) with 7.5 hours storage is online from November 2018
Ivanpah Solar Power Facility	US	San Bernardino County, California	35°34′N 115°28′W	392	2014	Solar power tower		Completed on February 13, 2014
Mojave Solar Project	US	Barstow, California	35°00′40″N 117°19′30″W	280	2014	Parabolic trough		Completed December 2014. Gross capacity of 280 MW corresponds to net capacity of 250 MW
Solana Generating Station	US	Gila Bend, Arizona	32°55′N 112°58′W	280	October 2013	Parabolic trough	6	
Genesis Solar Energy Project	US	Blythe, California	33°38′37.68″N 114°59′16.8″W	280	24 April 2014	Parabolic trough		
Solaben Solar Power Station	Spain	Logrosán	39°13′29″N 5°23′26″W	200	June 2012	Parabolic trough		Solaben 3 completed June 2012; Solaben 2 completed October 2012; Solaben 1 and 6 completed September 2013
Solar Energy Generating Systems (SEGS)	US	Mojave Desert, California	35°01′54″N 117°20′53″W	160	1984	Parabolic trough		Originally collection of 9 units 1984–1990 with 354 MW. Seven units were decommissioned and replaced by solar PV.
Solnova Solar Power Station	Spain	Sanlúcar la Mayor	37°25′00″N 06°17′20″W	150	May 2010	Parabolic trough		Solnova 1 completed May 2010; Solnova 3 completed May 2010; Solnova 4 completed August 2010
Andasol solar power station	Spain	Guadix	37°13′42.70″N 3°4′6.73″W	150	2008	Parabolic trough	7.5	Completed: Andasol 1 (2008), Andasol 2 (2009), Andasol 3 (2011). Each equipped with a 7.5 hour thermal energy storage.
Extresol Solar Power Station	Spain	Torre de Miguel Sesmero	38°39′N 6°44′W	150	2010	Parabolic trough	7.5	Completed: Extresol 1 and 2 (2010), Extresol 3 (2012). Each equipped with a 7.5-hour thermal energy storage.
Dhursar	India	Dhursar, Jaisalmer district	26°47′09″N 72°00′30″E	125	November 2014	Fresnel reflector		
Ashalim Power Station (Negev Energy)	Israel	Ashalim	30°57′N 34°42′E	121		Parabolic trough	4.5	4.5h heat storage. Completed August 2019 and located in Negev desert
Megalim Power Station (Negev Energy)	Israel	Ashalim	30°56′N 34°43′E	121		Solar power tower		Completed April 2019 and located in Negev desert
Crescent Dunes Solar Energy Project	US	Nye County, Nevada	38°14′N 117°22′W	110		Solar power tower	10	With 10h heat storage; commercial operation began September 2015, mothballed since May 2019
Cerro Dominador Solar Thermal Plant (Atacama 1)	Chile	María Elena, Antofagasta	22.77191°S 69.47994°W	110		Solar power tower	17.5	Completed April 2021, with 17.5h heat storage
Shouhang Dunhuang	China	Dunhuang (Gansu Province)	40°3′41″N 94°25′37″E	110		Solar power tower	15 / 7.5	Phase I completed in 2016, Phase II with 7.5h heat storage. Operational since end of December 2018
Kathu Solar Park	South Africa	Northern Cape	27°31′59.67″S 23°8′10.56″E	100		Parabolic trough	4.5	Completed February 2018, with 4.5h heat storage
KaXu Solar One	South Africa	Pofadder, Northern Cape	28°53′40.56″S 19°35′53.52″E	100		Parabolic trough	2.5	With 2.5h heat storage
Xina Solar One	South Africa	Pofadder, Northern Cape	28°53′40.56″S 19°35′53.52″E	100	2017	Parabolic trough	5.5	Commissioned in September 2017 with 5.5h heat storage
Manchasol Power Station	Spain	Alcázar de San Juan	39°11′N 3°18′W	100	2011	Parabolic trough	7.5	Manchasol 1 and 2 completed in 2011, each with 7.5h heat storage
Valle Solar Power Station	Spain	San José del Valle	36°39′N 5°50′W	100	2011	Parabolic trough	7.5	Completed December 2011, with 7.5h heat storage
Helioenergy Solar Power Station	Spain	Écija	37°34′43″N 5°9′24″W	100	2011	Parabolic trough		Helioenergy 1 completed September 2011; Helioenergy 2 completed January 2012
Aste Solar Power Station	Spain	Alcázar de San Juan	39°10′22″N 3°15′58″W	100	2012	Parabolic trough	8	Aste 1A Completed January 2012, with 8h heat storage Aste 1B Completed January 2012, with 8h heat storage
Solacor Solar Power Station	Spain	El Carpio	37°54′54″N 4°30′9″W	100		Parabolic trough		Solacor 1 completed February 2012; Solacor 2 completed March 2012
Helios Solar Power Station	Spain	Puerto Lápice	39°14′24″N 3°28′12″W	100	2012	Parabolic trough		Helios 1 completed May 2012; Helios 2 completed August 2012
Shams solar power station	UAE	Abu Dhabi Madinat Zayed	23°34′N 53°42′E	100		Parabolic trough		Shams 1 completed March 2013
Termosol Solar Power Station	Spain	Navalvillar de Pela		100	2013	Parabolic trough		Both Termosol 1 and 2 completed in 2013
Palma del Río I & II	Spain	Palma del Río	37°38′42.56″N 5°15′29.32″W	100		Parabolic trough		Palma del Rio 2 completed December 2010; Palma del Rio 1 completed July 2011
Ilanga 1	South Africa	Northern Cape (Upington)	28°29′25.79″S 21°32′27.13″E	100		Parabolic trough	5	With 5h heat storage. Operational since 2018
CSNP Royal Tech Urat CSP	China	Urat Middle Banner, Inner Mongolia		100	2020	Parabolic trough	10	Completed in January 2020 with 10 hours of thermal storage
Guazhou Thermosolar Plant	China	Guazhou, Jiuquan, Gansu Province		100	2025		6	The world's first dual-tower CSP station
Martin Next Generation Solar Energy Center	US	Indiantown, Florida	27°03′11″N 80°33′00″W	75		ISCC with parabolic trough		Completed December 2010
Nevada Solar One	US	Boulder City, Nevada	35°48.0′N 114°58.6′W	75		Parabolic trough		Operational since 2007
Dacheng Dunhuang CSP	China	Dunhuang, Gansu Province		60	2016	Fresnel reflector	16 / 15	10 MW Phase 1 completed in 2016, 50 MW Phase 2 in December 2019 with 15 hours of thermal storage
Supcon Solar Delingha	China	Delingha	37°22′13″N 97°16′56″E	60	2013	Solar power tower	2 / 7	10 MW Phase 1 completed in 2013, Phase 2 completed in December 2018 with 7 hours of thermal energy storage
Guzmán	Spain	Palma del Río	37°38′N 5°15′W	50	2012	Parabolic trough		Completed July 2012
Khi Solar One	South Africa	Upington	28°33′0.36″S 21°5′5.28″E	50	2016	Solar power tower	2	Completed Feb 2016; With 2h heat storage
Bokpoort	South Africa	Groblershoop	28°43′26.96″S 21°59′34.88″E	50		Parabolic trough	9	With 9h heat storage
Puertollano Solar Thermal Power Plant	Spain	Puertollano, Ciudad Real	38°39′N 3°58′W	50	2009	Parabolic trough		Completed May 2009
Alvarado I	Spain	Badajoz	38°49′37″N 06°49′34″W	50	2009	Parabolic trough		Completed July 2009
La Florida	Spain	Alvarado (Badajoz)		50	2010	Parabolic trough		Completed July 2010
Arenales PS	Spain	Morón de la Frontera (Seville)		50		Parabolic trough		2013
Casablanca	Spain	Talarrubias		50		Parabolic trough		2013
Majadas de Tiétar	Spain	Caceres	39°58′10″N 5°44′32″W	50	2010	Parabolic trough		Completed August 2010
La Dehesa	Spain	La Garrovilla (Badajoz)	38°57′35″N 6°27′50″W	50		Parabolic trough		Completed November 2010
Lebrija-1	Spain	Lebrija		50	2011	Parabolic trough		Completed July 2011
Astexol 2	Spain	Badajoz	38°48′42″N 7°3′36″W	50	2011	Parabolic trough	7.5	Completed November 2011, with 7.5h thermal energy storage
Morón	Spain	Morón de la Frontera	37°7′11.24″N 5°33′50.45″W	50	2012	Parabolic trough		Completed May 2012
La Africana	Spain	Posada		50	2012	Parabolic trough	7.5	Completed July 2012, with 7.5h thermal energy storage
Olivenza 1	Spain	Olivenza	38°45′18.73″N 7°8′40.42″W	50	2012	Parabolic trough		Completed July 2012
Orellana	Spain	Orellana la Vieja	39°1′17.6″N 5°31′57.4″W	50	2012	Parabolic trough		Completed August 2012
Godawari Green Energy Limited	India	Nokh Village, Rajasthan	27°36′01″N 72°13′25″E	50	2013	Parabolic trough		2013
Enerstar Villena Power Plant	Spain	Villena	38°43′41.51″N 0°55′18.23″W	50	2013	Parabolic trough		Completed 2013
Megha Solar Plant	India	Anantapur	14°56′47″N 77°41′15″E	50	2014	Parabolic trough		Completed 2014
Delingha Solar Plant	China	Delingha	37°22′13″N 97°16′56″E	50	2018	Parabolic trough	9	Completed July 2018 with 9 hours of thermal energy storage
Shagaya CSP	Kuwait	Shagaya	29°13′41″N 47°03′45″E	50	2019	Parabolic trough	10	Commercial operation started in February 2019, 10 hours thermal storage
Waad Al Shamal ISCC Plant	Saudi Arabia	Waad Al Shamal	31°39′37″N 38°51′29″E	50	2018	ISCC with parabolic trough		Commercial operation started in 2018, 1,390 MW plant with 50 MW solar
Qinghai Gonghe CSP	China	Gonghe, Qinghai Province	36°06′08″N 100°37′30″E	50	2019	Solar power tower	6	Completed in September 2019, with 6 h heat storage.
Luneng Haixi CSP	China	Haixi Zhou, Qinghai Sheng		50	2019	Solar power tower	12	Completed in September 2019 with 12 hours of thermal energy storage
Hami CSP	China	Hami, Xinjiang Autonomous Region		50		Solar power tower	13	Completed in September 2019 with 13 hours of thermal energy storage
Yumen Xinneng CSP	China	Yumen, Gansu Province		50	2020	Beam down tower	9	

Solar thermal power stations
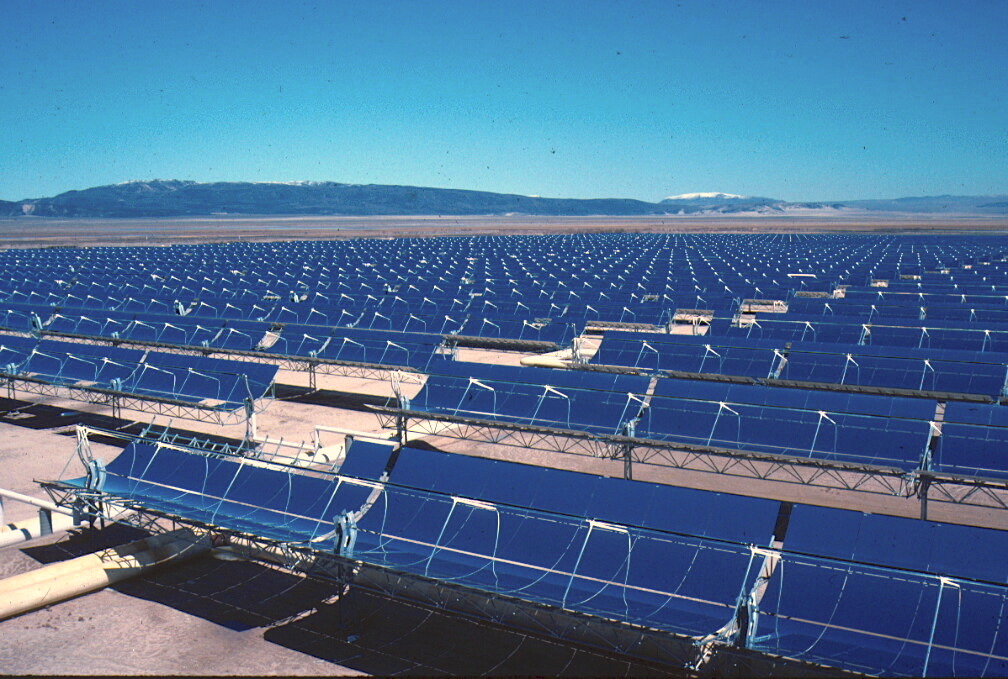
Part of the 354 MW SEGS solar complex in San Bernardino, California, United States

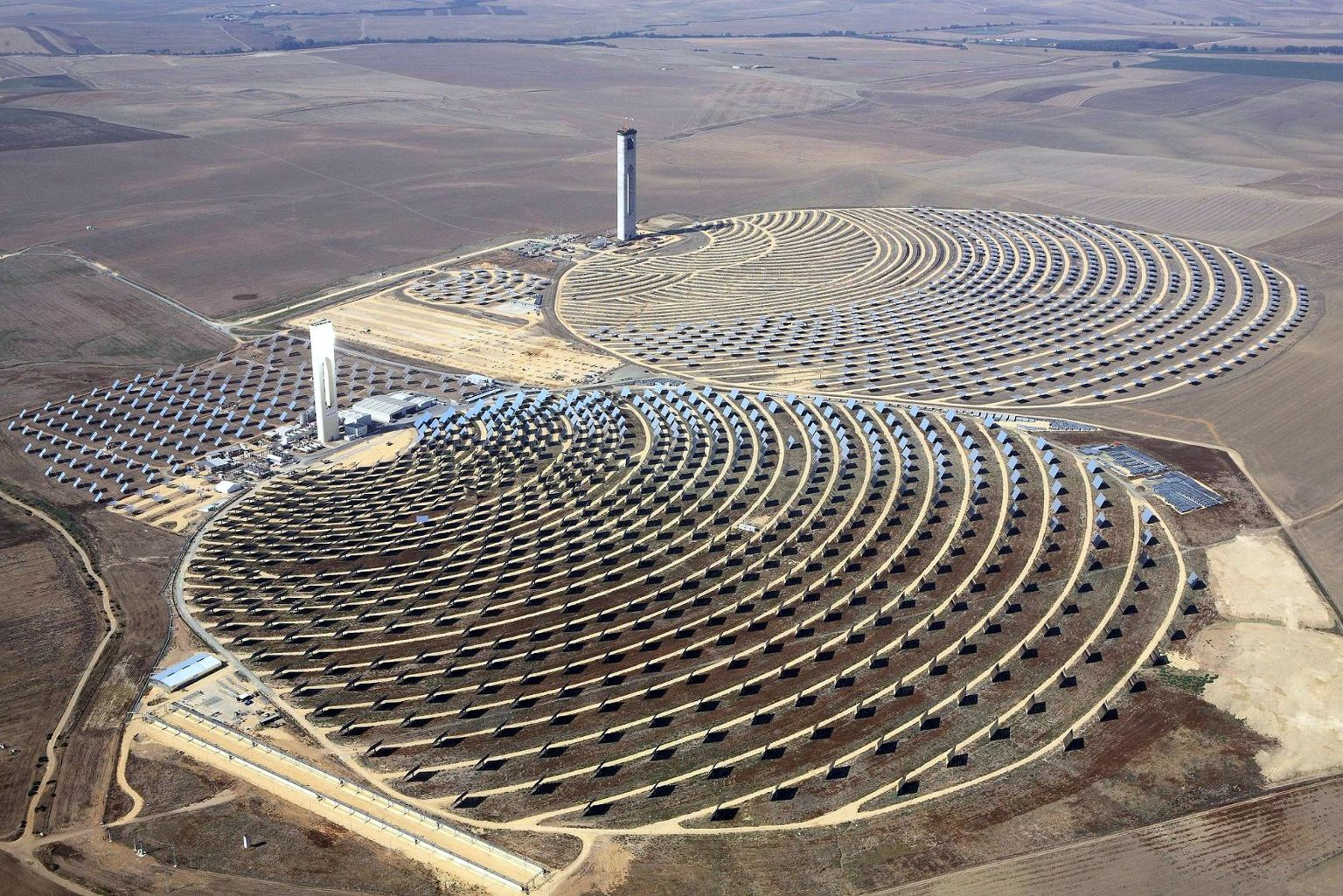
The PS10 and PS20 solar power plant near Seville, in Andalusia, Spain

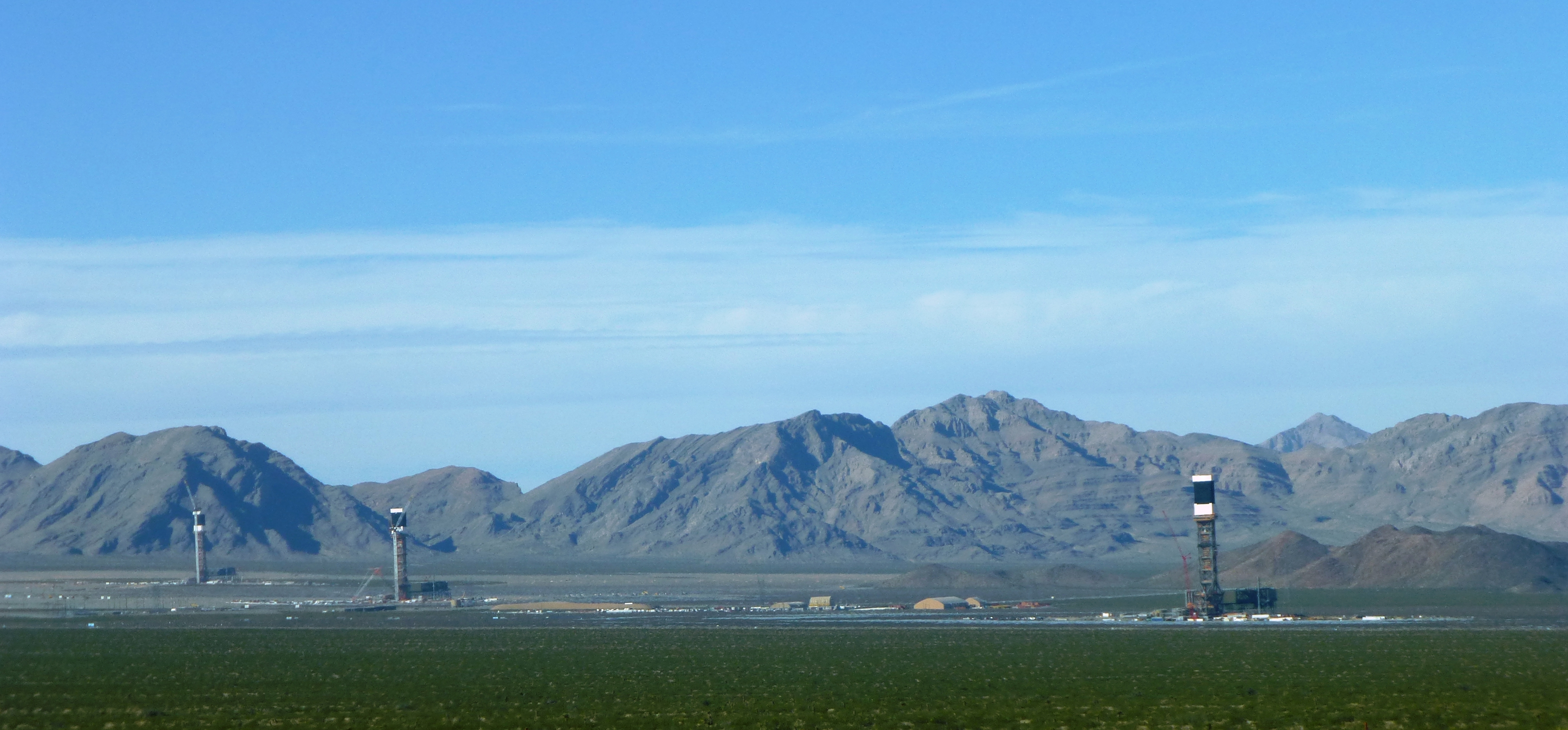
The Ivanpah solar project in San Bernardino, California, United States

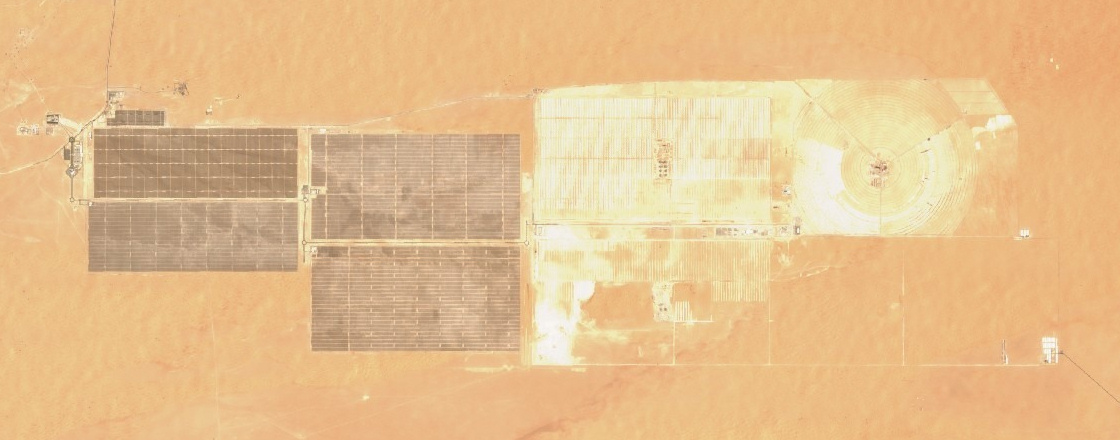
The Mohammed bin Rashid Al Maktoum Solar Park is the largest single-site concentrated solar power plant in the world.

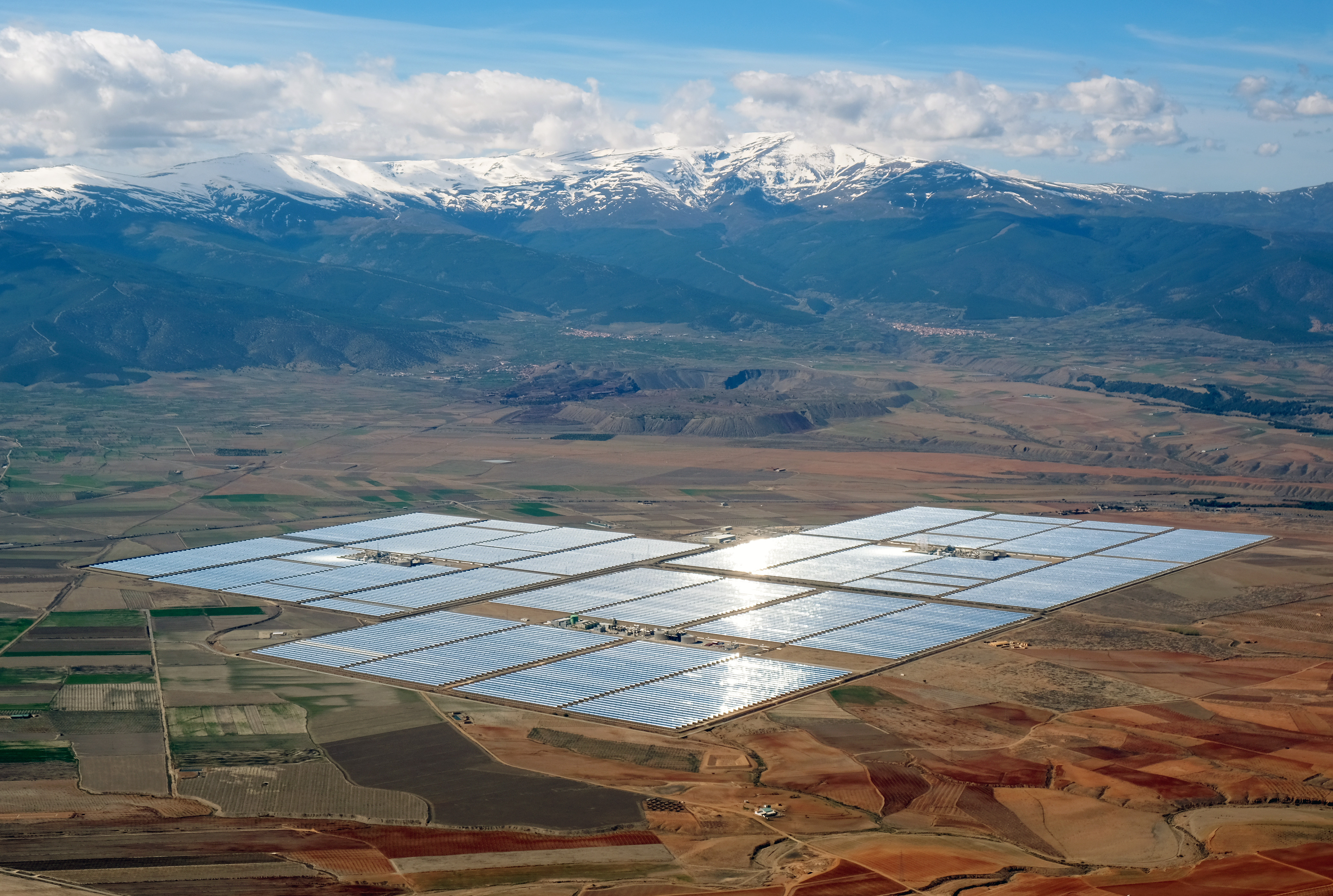
The Andasol Solar Power Station, Spain, uses a molten salt thermal energy storage to generate electricity, even when the sun is not shining.

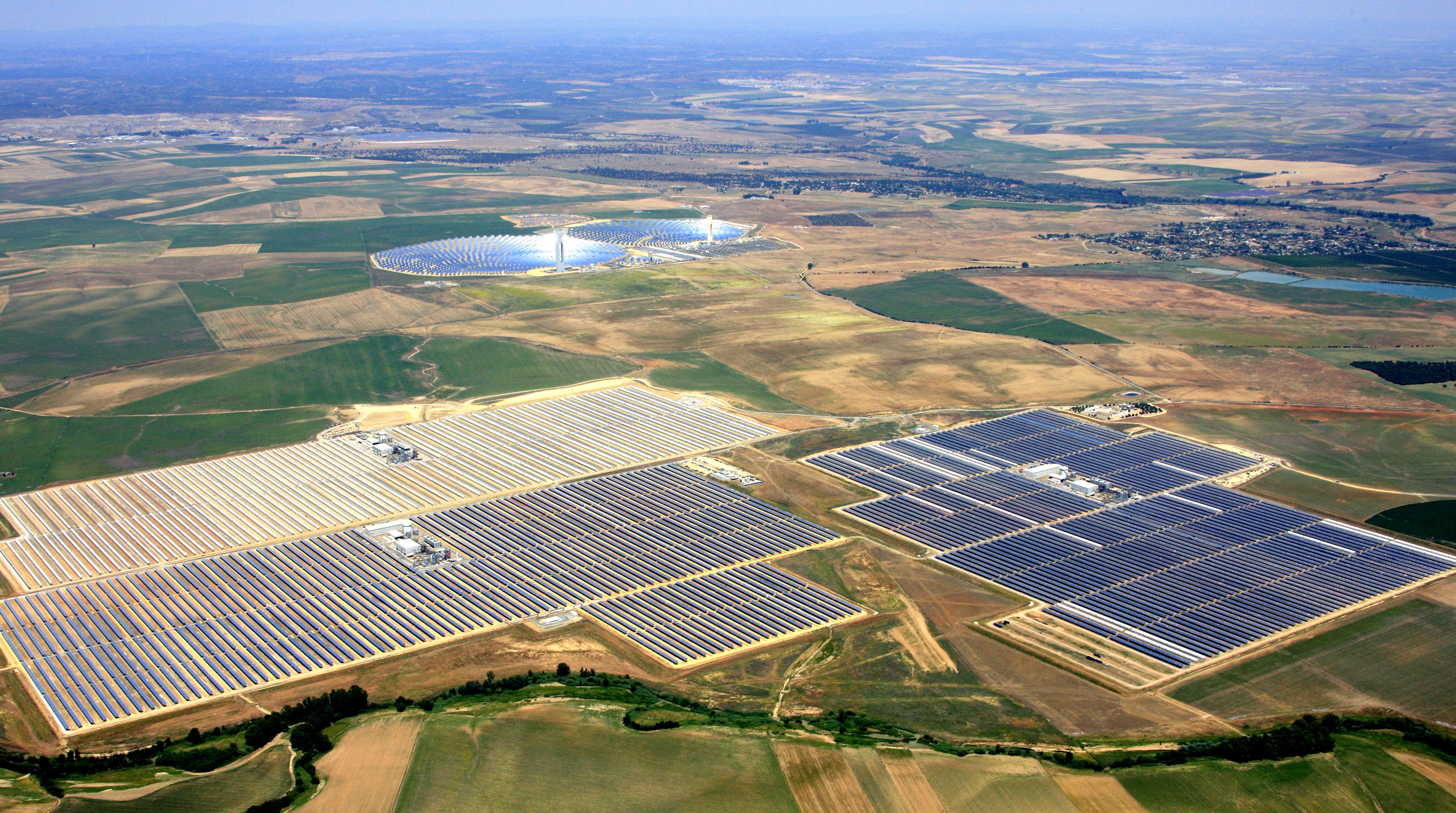
Parts of the Solnova Solar Power Station in the foreground. The two towers of the PS10 and PS20 solar power stations can be seen in the background.

== Under construction ==
Solar thermal power stations under construction (of at least 50 MW capacity)
Name	Country	Location	Co-ordinates	Electrical capacity (MW)	Expected completion	Technology	Notes
Golmud CSP	China	Golmud, Qinghai province		200		Power tower	
Shouhang Yumen CSP	China	Yumen, Gansu Province		100		Solar power tower	
Redstone Solar Thermal Power	South Africa	Northern Cape	28°17′53″S 23°21′56″E	100	2023	Solar power tower	12h heat storage
Erdos Solar Power Plant	China	Hanggin Banner		50		Parabolic trough	
Gansu Akesai CSP	China	Akesai, Gansu Province		50	?	Parabolic trough	15h storage
Rayspower Yumen CSP	China	Yumen, Gansu Province		50	?	Parabolic trough	

== Announced ==
Solar thermal power stations announced
Name	Country	Location	Coordinates	Electrical capacity (MW)	Technology	Notes
Noor Midelt II	Morocco	Morocco	32°40′51″N 04°43′59″W	230		
Noor Midelt I	Morocco	Morocco	32°40′51″N 04°43′59″W	200	Hybrid solar power with combination of 600 MW solar PV and 200 MW solar thermal with 5h heat storage	
Tamarugal Solar Project	Chile	Atacama Desert, Chile		450	Three solar power towers with 13h heat storage	
Likana Solar Project	Chile	Antofagasta		390	Three solar power towers with 13h heat storage	
Copiapó Solar Project	Chile	Atacama Desert, Chile		260	Solar power tower PV integrated. With 14h heat storage.	
Gulang CSP	China	Wuwei, Gansu Province		100	Parabolic trough	
Golden Tower CSP	China	Jinta, Gansu Province		100	Power tower	
Mashhad solar-thermal power station	Iran	Mashhad, Iran		72	Parabolic dish with tracer system	
Chabei CSP	China	Chabei, Hebei Province		64	Parabolic trough	
Al-Abdaliya	Kuwait	??		60	Parabolic trough	
AZ 20	Spain	Sevilla		50	Solar power tower	
Shangyi CSP	China	Shangyi, Hebei Province		50	Power tower	
Zhangjiakou CSP	China	Zhangbei, Hebei Province		50	Fresnel reflector	

== Cancelled ==
Solar thermal power stations cancelled
Name	Country	Location	Coordinates	Electrical capacity (MW)	Technology	Notes
Sandstone Solar Energy Project	US	Nye County, Nevada	37°54′00″N 116°42′00″W	1,600	Solar power tower	8 units with 10h heat storage
Blythe Solar Power Project	US	Blythe, California		1,000	Parabolic trough	4 units, converted to 485 MW PV
Stirling Energy Systems Solar One Project	US	San Bernardino County, California		850	Dish Stirling	converted to 618 MW PV, license terminated 27 August 2013
Stirling Energy Systems Solar Two Project	US	Imperial County, California		750	Dish Stirling	converted to 594 MW PV
Palen Solar Power Project	US	Riverside County, California		500	Parabolic trough	2 units, certification expired 15 December 2015
Ridgecrest Solar Power Project	US	Kern County, California		250	Parabolic trough	2 units, license terminated 22 April 2014
Luz SEGS XI-XII Project	US	San Bernardino County, California		160	Parabolic trough	license expired 22 September 1989
Aurora Solar Thermal Power Project	Australia	Port Augusta, South Australia	32.2°S 137.6°E	150	Solar power tower	
El Reboso 2+3	Spain	La Puebla del Rio (Seville)		100		Parabolic trough
SCE Solar 100	US	Johnson Valley, California		100	Solar power tower	license expired 1983
Diwakar	India	Askandra		100	Parabolic trough	2014, Parabolic trough with 3h heat storage
KVK Energy Solar Project	India	Askandra		100	Parabolic trough	2014, Parabolic trough with 4h heat storage

== Decommissioned ==
- Eurelios pilot plant, a 1 MW, power tower design in Adrano, Sicily, operational 1981–1987
- Solar One pilot plant, operational 1982–1986; converted into Solar Two, operational 1995–1999; site demolished 2009 – USA California, 10 MW, power tower design
- SES-5 – USSR, 5 MW, power tower design, water / Steam, service period 1985–1989
- Maricopa Solar – USA Peoria, Arizona, 1.5 MW dish stirling SES / Tessera Solar's first commercial-scale Dish Stirling power plant. Completed January 2010, decommissioned September 2011 and sold to CondiSys Solar Technology of China in April 2012.

== Largest plants by technology ==
Largest operational solar thermal power stations by technology
Technology type		Name	Country	Location	Coordinates	Capacity MW	Notes and references
Solar power tower	without thermal storage	Ivanpah Solar Power Facility	US	San Bernardino County, California	35°34′N 115°28′W	392	Completed on February 13, 2014. The station uses natural gas as supplementary fuel.
Solar power tower	with thermal storage	Ouarzazate Solar Power Station	Morocco	Ghassate (Ouarzazate province)	30°59′40″N 6°51′48″W	510	
Parabolic trough	without thermal storage	Solar Energy Generating Systems (SEGS)	US	Mojave Desert, California	35°01′54″N 117°20′53″W	310	Collection of 9 units. The station has gas firing facility to run the units during night time.
Parabolic trough	with thermal storage	Mohammed bin Rashid Al Maktoum Solar Park	United Arab Emirates	Dubai	24.7547°N 55.365°E	600	15 hours heat storage. The biggest solar thermal power station with total capacity 700 MW. 600 MW parabolic trough and 100MW solar tower power station.
ISCC with parabolic trough		Martin Next Generation Solar Energy Center	US	Indiantown, Florida	27°03′11″N 80°33′00″W	75	Completed December 2010. Basically combined cycle power plant running on natural gas. Solar energy is supplemented to reduce the natural gas consumption for the same station output.
Fresnel reflector without thermal storage		Dhursar	India	Dhursar, Jaisalmer district	26°47′N 72°00′E	100	Completed November 2014, referred to as 125 MW in some sources
Dish Stirling							No utility scale installastions currently operational, 1.5MW Maricopa Solar was largest

== See also ==
- Concentrated solar power
- List of concentrating solar thermal power companies
- List of energy storage projects
- List of large wind farms
- List of largest power stations in the world
- List of photovoltaic power stations
- Plataforma Solar de Almería
- Renewable energy commercialization
- Renewable energy industry
- Solar power by country
- Solar power in China
- Solar power plants in the Mojave Desert
- Solar thermal energy
