= Mojave Solar Project =

Solar power plant in California, US

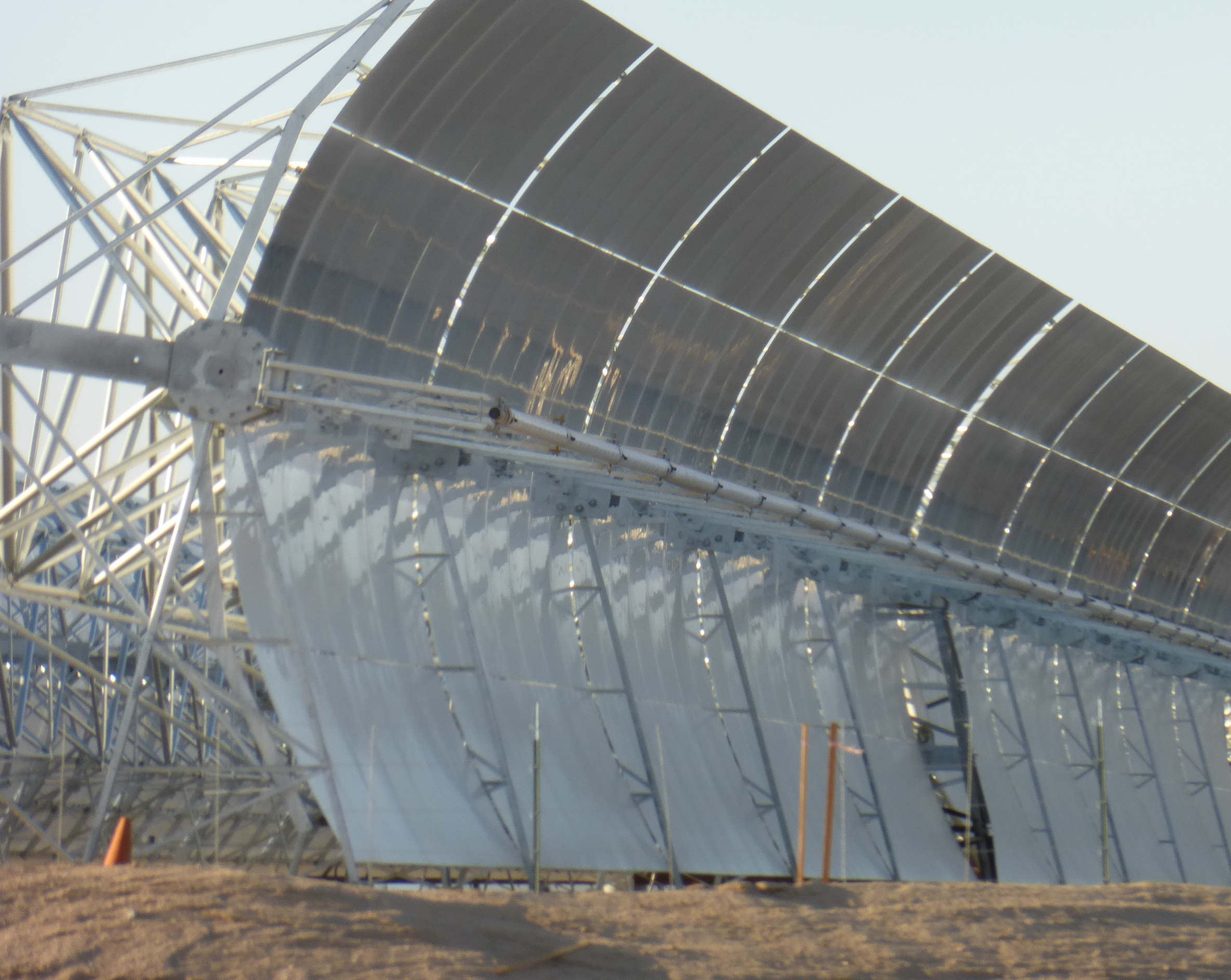
- Country: United States
- Location: Mojave Desert, California
- Coordinates: 35°0′40″N 117°19′30″W
- Status: Operational
- Construction began: September 2011
- Commission date: December 1, 2014

Solar farm
- Type: CSP
- CSP technology: Parabolic trough
- Collectors: 2256 (SCAs)
- Total collector area: 1,559,347 square metres (385.323 acres)
- Site resource: 2,685 kW·h/m^{2}/yr
- Site area: 1,765 acres (714 ha)

Power generation
- Units operational: 2 x 140 MWe (gross)
- Nameplate capacity: 250 MW
- Capacity factor: 26.5% (2016–2020)
- Annual net output: 579 GW·h

External links
- Website: mojave solar project
- Commons: Related media on Commons

The Mojave Solar Project (MSP) is a concentrated solar power (CSP) facility in the Mojave Desert in California, about 20 miles (32 km) northwest of Barstow. Surrounding the hamlet of Lockhart, Mojave Solar is adjacent to Harper Lake and the SEGS VIII–IX solar plant.

The site was originally reserved for the planned, never built, SEGS IX and XII. For 15 years following its construction in 1990, SEGS VIII–IX was the largest commercial solar power plant in the world, generating around 160 MW at its peak. It is one of three separately owned sites within 40 miles (64 km) of one another, that make up the nine solar fields in the Solar Electric Generating System (SEGS #1 and 2 are at Daggett, and #3 through 7 are at Kramer Junction). Harper Lake was the last of these built, and is designated as SEGS #8 and 9. It is still online, but has been surpassed by other newer facilities, including the Mojave Solar Project.

MSP, with a combined nameplate capacity of 250 MW (gross 280 MW), is made of two, independently operable, solar fields. The power plant cost an estimated $1.6 billion in total and entered commercial operation in December 2014. The developer, Abengoa, has successfully secured a $1.2 billion loan guarantee from the US government for the project. The plant is expected to generate 617,000 MWh of power annually, enough power for more than 88,000 households and to prevent the emission of over 430 kilotons of CO_{2} a year. Pacific Gas & Electric has agreed to a 25-year power purchase agreement.

The plant was commissioned on 1 December 2014.

== Technology ==
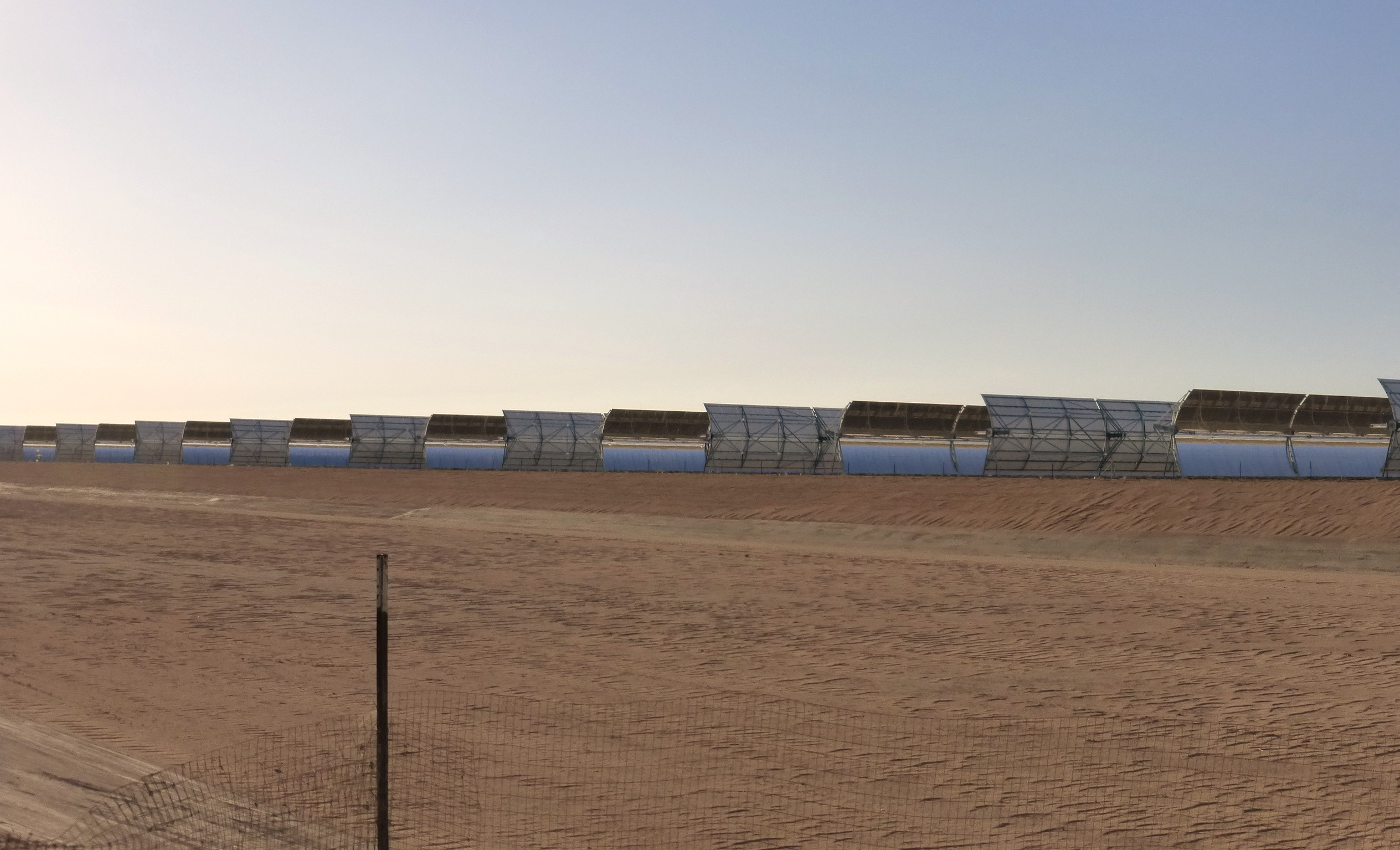
The array of parabolic troughs at the Mojave Solar Project site in their stow position.

Using the desert's solar thermal energy, the facility generates steam in solar steam generators, which expands through a steam turbine generator to produce electrical power from twin, independently operable solar fields, each feeding a 125 MW power island. Generation is provided 100% from sun, no supplement from fossil-based energy sources. There is a gas-fired auxiliary boiler, for each field, only to provide equipment and heat-transfer fluid (HTF) freeze protection, when temperatures fall below 54 °F (12 °C).

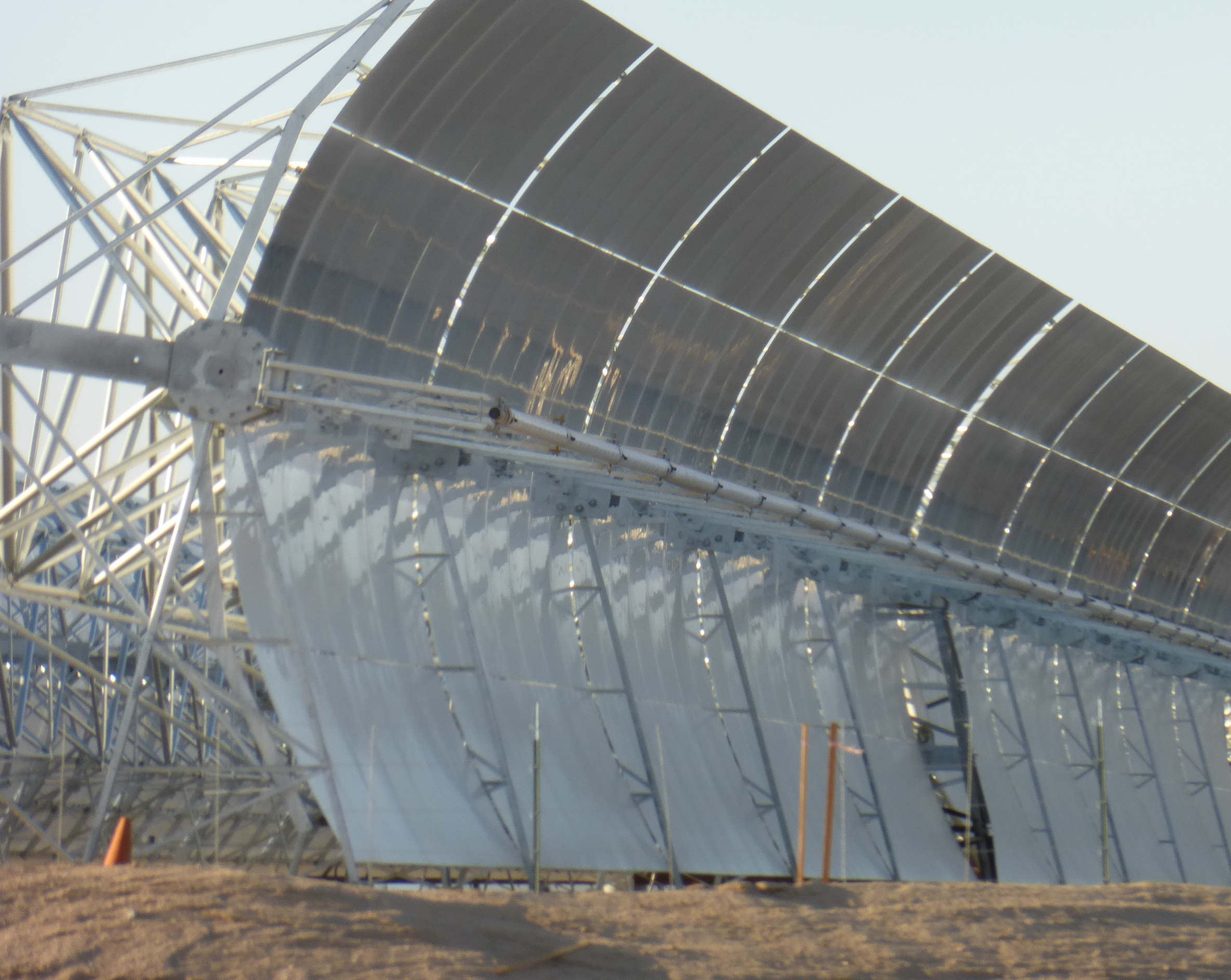
The details of the parabolic trough used in the project.

The power cycle is a Rankine-with-reheat thermodynamic cycle from heat supplied via heat-transfer fluid, solar field heated up to 740 °F (393 °C). When operating, the transfer fluid enters the solar field at about 520 °F (271 °C). The steam generator steam exit temperature is about 720 °F (382 °C).

Each field utilizes 1128 solar collector arrays (SCA) sited on about 710 acres (290 ha). Each SCA, model E2 from Abengoa (derived from Luz's LS-3), is 125 metres (410 ft) long and is made of 10 solar collector elements (SCE), 12 metres (39 ft) long each and 5.76 metres (18.9 ft) aperture. The E2 steel frame collector with monolithic glass reflector panels, yields a total aperture area of 691.2 square metres (7,440 sq ft). That makes a total of 779,674 square metres (8,392,340 sq ft) aperture each solar field, 1,559,347 square metres (16,784,670 sq ft) total for the plant, operating about 3,024 hours per year.

Cooling is provided by wet cooling towers; water for the towers and solar collector washing, is supplied from onsite groundwater wells. Water from condensed steam exits the cooling tower pump at about 80 °F (27 °C), before cycling back to the steam generator.

== Production ==
Mojave Solar Project production is as follows (values in MW·h).

Generation (MW·h) of Mojave Solar Project
Year	Jan	Feb	Mar	Apr	May	Jun	Jul	Aug	Sep	Oct	Nov	Dec	Total
2015	4,816	28,254	49,104	57,830	49,132	43,618	64,353	63,367	57,559	37,406	32,818	15,319	503,576
2016	4,635	42,348	41,890	54,991	75,569	80,338	87,565	79,153	68,245	45,346	30,315	14,512	624,907
2017	6,055	22,196	54,504	61,408	76,179	78,362	74,443	58,478	63,663	55,255	21,818	21,669	594,030
2018	21,688	37,489	48,733	42,966	78,035	84,956	70,267	71,788	74,929	51,473	13,976	8,880	605,180
2019	7,515	11,390	46,369	58,355	58,087	77,835	68,904	59,394	46,771	47,293	25,166	7,405	514,484
2020	12,129	34,521	36,296	52,915	76,143	62,317	84,935	70,617	42,023	42,479	27,705	16,334	558,414
2021	12,791	12,868	47,671	68,076	80,161	72,881	62,811	74,112	63,478	43,962	33,885	15,281	587,977
2022	11,423	20,956	55,560	66,317	76,011	80,549	71,095	66,275	56,939	48,817	27,423	14,337	595,702
2023	16,981	20,739	40,762	73,168	78,781	77,368	82,415	68,125	63,301	49,837	27,686	13,239	612,402
Total (2015–2023)													5,196,672

Maximum production was planned at 617,000 MW·h per year.

== See also ==
- List of solar thermal power stations
- Renewable energy in the United States
- Solar power plants in the Mojave Desert
- Solar thermal energy
