= Puertollano Solar Thermal Power Plant =

Solar Thermal Power Plant

- Country: Spain
- Location: near Guadix, Granada
- Coordinates: 38°39′N 3°58′W
- Status: Operational
- Commission date: May 8, 2009
- Owners: Iberdrola, IDEA

Solar farm
- Type: CSP
- CSP technology: Parabolic trough
- Collectors: 120,000
- Site area: 150 hectares (371 acres)

Power generation
- Units operational: 1
- Nameplate capacity: 50 MW

The Puertollano Solar Thermal Power Plant is a 50-megawatt (MW) concentrated solar thermal power station using parabolic trough, located near Puertollano in the Province of Ciudad Real, Spain. It is owned 90% by Iberdrola and 10% by IDEA. It uses 352 parabolic-cylinder collectors, with 120,000 parabolic mirrors and 13,000 absorber tubes.

Three additional sections are planned for operation beginning in 2013, Puertollano 2, 72 MW, Puertollano 3, 12.4 MW, and Puertollano 4, 50 MW.

== See also ==
- List of solar thermal power stations
- Renewable energy in the European Union
- Solar power in Spain
- Solar thermal energy
- Wind power in Spain
