= Extresol Solar Power Station =

Concentrated solar thermal power station in Spain

- Country: Spain
- Location: near Torre de Miguel Sesmero, Badajoz
- Coordinates: 38°39′N 6°44′W
- Status: Operational
- Commission date: 2009
- Owner: ACS/Cobra Group

Solar farm
- Type: CSP
- CSP technology: Parabolic trough
- Site resource: 2,168 kWh/m^{2}/yr
- Site area: 600 hectares (1,483 acres)

Power generation
- Nameplate capacity: 149.7 MW
- Capacity factor: 37.7%
- Annual net output: 495 GWh
- Storage capacity: 1,123 MW·h_{e}

The Extresol Solar Power Station is a 150 megawatt (MW) commercial concentrated solar thermal power plant, located in Torre de Miguel Sesmero in the province of Badajoz, Extremadura, Spain.

The power station consists of three different systems, Extresol 1, Extresol 2 and Extresol 3, of 50 MW each, due to the power limitation of 50 MW per plant established by the Spanish legislation. Extresol uses parabolic trough and has a thermal energy storage system, which absorbs part of the heat produced in the solar field during the day and stores it in molten salts. Extresol 1 cost around €300 million and was inaugurated on 25 February 2009. The name of the power station, Extresol, is based on the name of the autonomous community, Extremadura, and the Spanish word for "Sun".

== See also ==
- List of solar thermal power stations
- List of energy storage projects
- Renewable energy in the European Union
- Sener Aeronáutica
- Solar power in Spain
- Solar thermal energy
- Wind power in Spain
