= Solar power station =

Solar power station may refer to:

- Concentrated solar power
- Photovoltaic power station
- Space-based solar power

== See also ==
- List of solar thermal power stations
- List of photovoltaic power stations
