= KaXu Solar One =

Concentrated solar thermal plant in South Africa

Kaxu Solar One
- Country: South Africa
- Location: Pofadder
- Coordinates: 28°52′52″S 19°35′35″E
- Status: Operational
- Construction began: November 2012
- Commission date: 2 March 2015
- Construction cost: $860 million

Solar farm
- Type: CSP
- CSP technology: Parabolic trough
- Site area: 1,100 hectares (2,718 acres)

Power generation
- Nameplate capacity: 100 MW
- Capacity factor: 36.5% (planned)
- Annual net output: 320 GWh (planned)
- Storage capacity: 250 MW·h_{e}

External links
- Website: kaxu

KaXu Solar One (KXSO) is a concentrated solar thermal plant located in the Northern Cape province of South Africa, NE from the town of Pofadder, Khâi-Ma Local Municipality. KaXu Solar One is a 100 megawatt (MW) parabolic trough plant and covers an area of 1,100 hectares (2,718 acres).

The KXSO collector surface is more than 800,000 m^{2} (8,600,000 sq ft) with a full-load molten salt storage capacity of 2.5 hours.

The project is developed by the Spanish company Abengoa, and financed with help from Industrial Development Corporation (IDC) and Community Trust group.

The name comes from Khoekhoe: !Ka xu //nu, lit. 'The whole sky'.

== See also ==
- List of solar thermal power stations
- Solar thermal energy
- List of power stations in South Africa
