= Sandstone Solar Energy Project =

Proposed and unbuilt concentrated solar power station in Nevada

- Country: United States
- Location: Tonopah, Nye County, Nevada
- Coordinates: 37°54′N 116°42′W
- Status: Proposed
- Construction began: 2022 (planned)
- Commission date: cancelled
- Construction cost: $5.0 billion (estimated)
- Owners: Sandstone Solar Energy, LLC (SolarReserve, LLC)

Solar farm
- Type: CSP
- CSP technology: Solar power tower
- Site resource: 2,685 kW·h/m^{2}/yr
- Site area: 20,000 acres (8,094 ha)

Power generation
- Units planned: 8
- Nameplate capacity: 1,600 MW
- Capacity factor: 40.0% (planned)
- Annual net output: 5,600 GW·h (planned)
- Storage capacity: 16,000 MW·h_{e}

External links
- Website: sandstone

The Sandstone Solar Energy Project was an up to 1,600 megawatt (MW) solar thermal power project with 16 gigawatt-hours of energy storage, planned just to the east of Tonopah, about 170 miles (270 km) northwest of Las Vegas. The project was about up to eight 200 MW solar towers with integrated molten salt energy storage technology. The project, developed by SolarReserve and owned by Sandstone Solar Energy, LLC. was anticipated to cost about $5 billion. Planned energy output is 5,600 GW·h per year.

The project includes heliostats that collect and focus the sun's thermal energy to heat molten salt flowing through a solar power tower. The molten salt circulates from the tower to a storage tank, where it is then used to produce steam and generate electricity. Excess thermal energy is stored in the molten salt and can be used to generate power for up to ten hours, including during the evening hours and when direct sunlight is not available. The storage technology also eliminates the need for any backup fossil fuels, such as natural gas.

Estimated construction start was in 2022. Each tower was constructed within a 24-month construction cycle, staggered 6 months, expecting about 5 1/2 years to complete.

In March 2019, the U.S. Bureau of Land Management confirmed that Sandstone Solar Energy has withdrawn its application for a construction and operation right-of-way on federal land for this project.

On 15 April 2019, Sandstone Solar Energy filed for withdrawal of the application for a permit to construct the solar plant and requested closure of the relevant docket (No.17-08003). The Commission acknowledged the filing and closed the docket the same day.

== See also ==
- List of solar thermal power stations
- Renewable energy in the United States
- Solar thermal energy
