= Genesis Solar Energy Project =

Concentrated solar thermal power station in the Mojave Desert of California

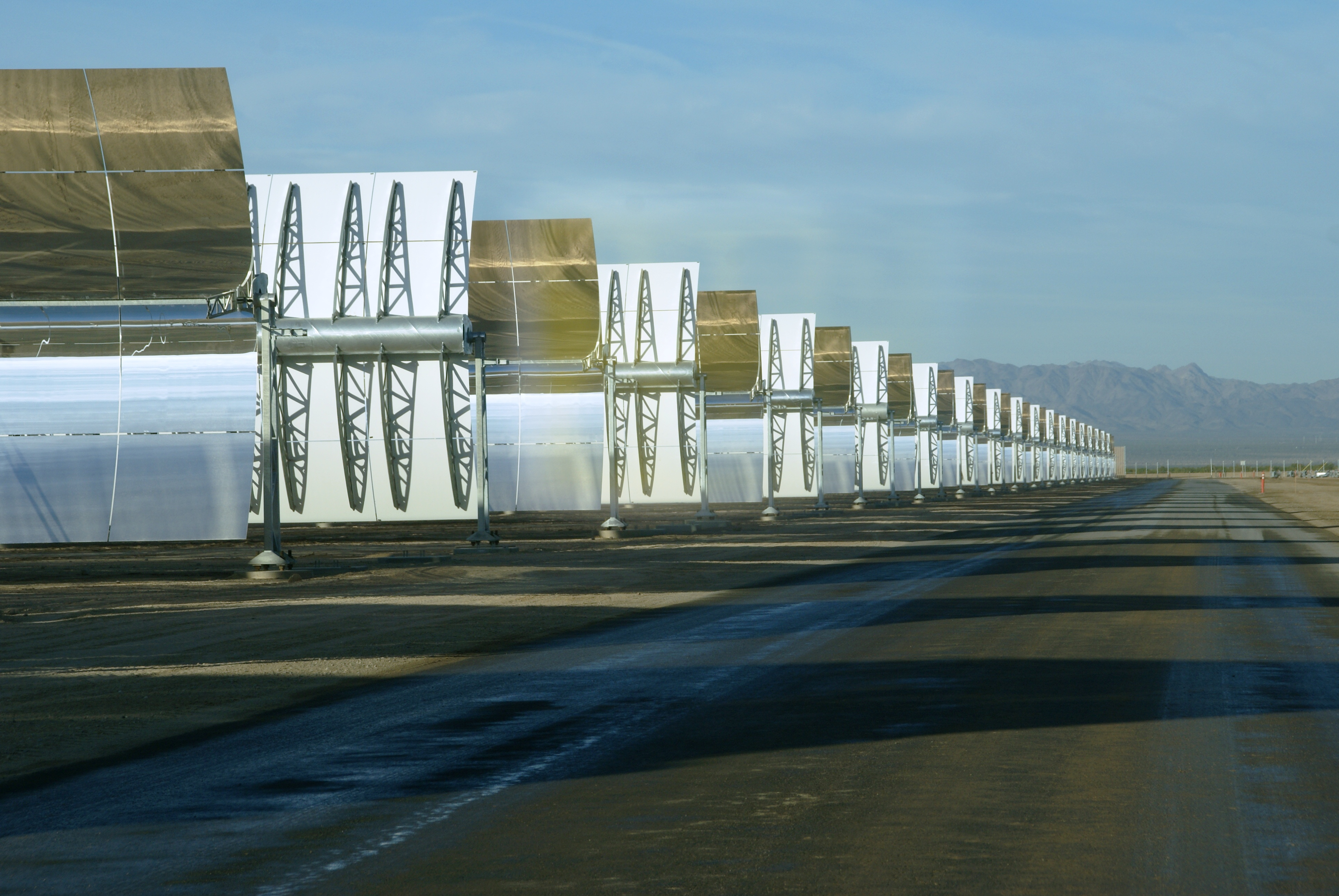
- Mirrors of the project, Mojave Desert, Lower Colorado River Valley, California.
- Country: United States
- Location: Riverside County, California
- Coordinates: 33°39′54″N 114°59′41″W
- Status: Operational
- Construction began: December 15, 2010
- Commission date: April 24, 2014
- Construction cost: US$1.25 billion
- Owner: NextEra Energy Partners
- Operator: NextEra Energy Resources

Solar farm
- Type: CSP
- CSP technology: Parabolic trough
- Collectors: 500,000
- Site area: 1,920 acres (780 ha)

Power generation
- Units operational: 2 x 140 MWe (gross)
- Nameplate capacity: 250 MW
- Capacity factor: 28.32% (2016-2020)
- Annual net output: 620 GW·h

The Genesis Solar Energy Project is a concentrated solar power station located in the Mojave Desert on 1,920 acres (780 ha) of Bureau of Land Management land, in eastern Riverside County, California. The plant is owned/managed by Genesis Solar, LLC, a subsidiary of NextEra Energy Resources, LLC. The Genesis Solar Energy Project is located about 25 miles (40 km) west of Blythe, in the Lower Colorado River Valley. The plant was built in the Colorado Desert along an ancient trade route that native people had traveled for thousands of years. The route traversed the Sonoran Desert and enabled trade between the Colorado River and the coast.

The solar power plant consists of two independent 125 MW net (140 MW gross) sections, using solar trough technology. This was one of three of the world's largest solar plants, that began supplying power in 2013 and 2014, located in the deserts of Riverside and San Bernardino counties. The Project power block and solar arrays occupy about 1,360 acres (550 ha) of the site. The rest are the evaporation ponds, access road, administration buildings and some fenced open area. The 1840 Solar Collector Assemblies are 1,048 square metres (11,280 sq ft) each, yielding 1,928,320 square metres (20,756,300 sq ft) of total solar aperture.

A June 2014 report details the project's potential impact on bird populations.

== Production ==
Genesis Solar Energy Project's production is as follows (MWh).

Generation (MW·h) of Genesis Solar Energy Project
Year	Jan	Feb	Mar	Apr	May	Jun	Jul	Aug	Sep	Oct	Nov	Dec	Total
2013											345	6,684	7,029
2014	4,892	13,080	48,455	60,960	72,621	80,979	68,861	66,969	63,976	46,236	35,271	13,813	576,113
2015	16,876	40,980	60,875	70,919	72,725	70,898	70,190	69,009	52,732	41,160	33,601	21,489	621,454
2016	17,573	45,940	55,704	55,737	79,177	76,282	77,787	67,890	58,971	48,245	30,618	10,218	624,142
2017	21,248	28,112	62,031	64,575	75,992	83,297	68,336	68,704	62,515	55,708	22,099	16,214	628,831
2018	24,000	37,452	50,348	63,379	79,074	80,337	65,787	67,571	67,820	43,918	29,755	13,701	623,142
2019	21,504	32,737	49,442	64,304	71,059	76,978	70,784	73,918	60,203	56,903	26,794	12,417	617,043
2020	18,874	34,184	46,428	68,153	82,837	78,973	82,897	64,037	50,644	46,579	29,435	6,088	609,129
2021	1,905	16,631	55,797	66,672	78,899	67,839	55,492	62,516	52,333	42,882	27,358	10,283	538,607
2022	22,275	37,730	55,671	68,625	80,949	78,285	62,529	57,542	50,694	50,523	31,068	17,816	613,707
2023	13,879	32,899	40,676	70,312	79,404	82,249	73,300	64,977	59,064	53,893	29,489	18,042	618,184
2024	4,204	24,675	53,182	66,029	81,067	79,534	73,400	66,545	63,708	49,184	31,085	31,086	623,699
2025	5,949	44,616											50,565
Total (2013-2023)													6,070,352

Maximum production was estimated at 580,000 MW·h per year.

== See also ==
- Solar power plants in the Mojave Desert
- List of solar thermal power stations
