= Bokpoort CSP =

Concentrated solar power (CSP) thermal energy

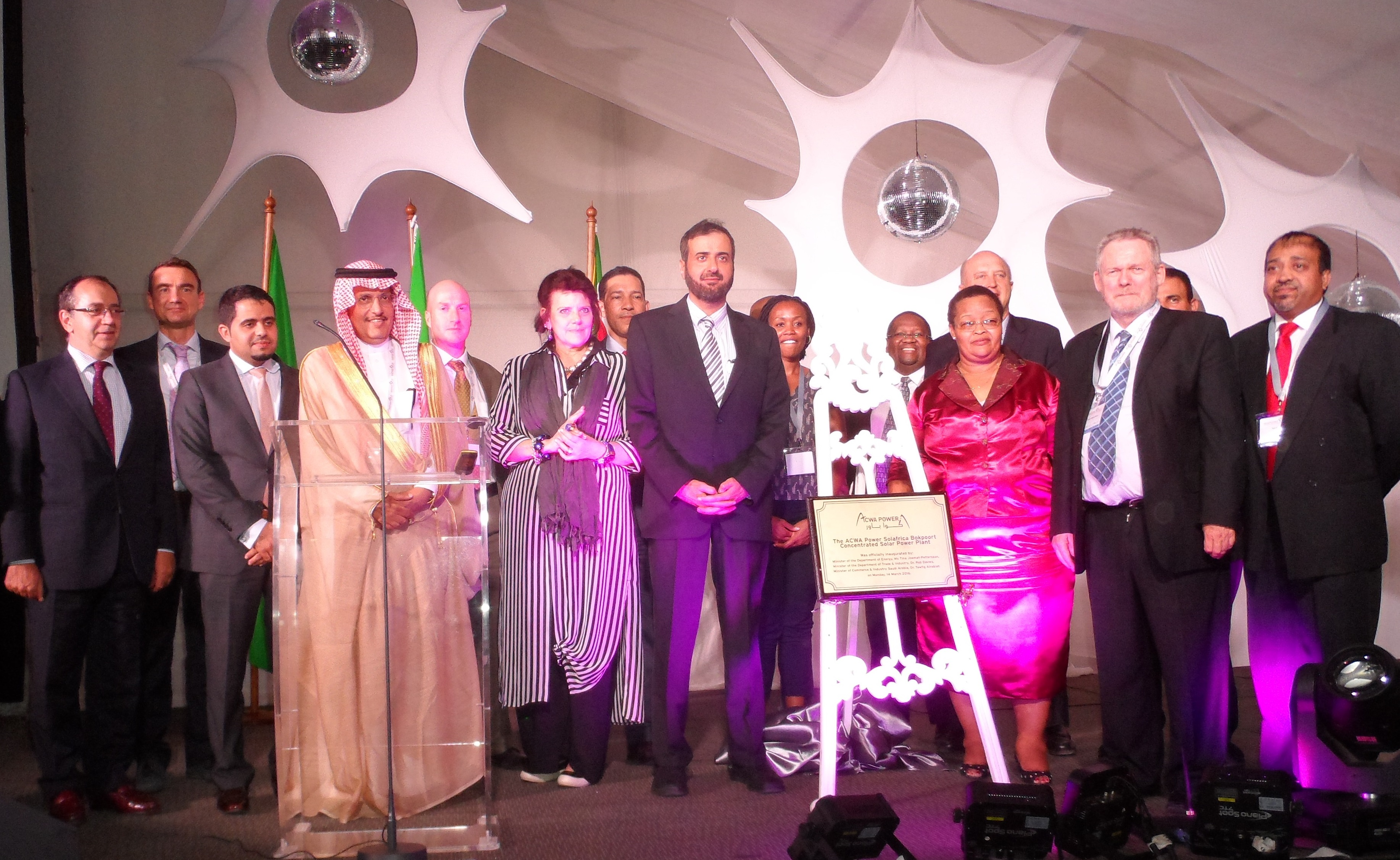
- Official name: ACWA Power Solafrica Bokpoort CSP Power Plant (Pty) Ltd
- Country: South Africa
- Location: Groblershoop
- Coordinates: 28.737750°S 21.997193°E
- Status: Operational
- Construction began: July 2013
- Commission date: 13 November 2015 (1st Synchronisation on SA Grid)
- Construction cost: R 5 bn ($339.93 mn)
- Owners: ACWA Power, PIC, Revego African Energy Limited, Community Trust
- Operator: Nomac IAE
- Employees: 75

Solar farm
- Type: CSP
- CSP technology: Parabolic Reflectors
- Collectors: 8600
- Site area: 300 hectares (741 acres)

Power generation
- Units operational: 1x 50 MW
- Make and model: Siemens
- Nameplate capacity: 50 MW
- Capacity factor: 53.4%
- Annual net output: 234 GW·h
- Storage capacity: 465 MW·h_{e}

Bokpoort CSP is a concentrated solar power (CSP) thermal energy power plant, located near Groblershoop in the Northern Cape province of South Africa. The project was procured pursuant to the Renewable Energy Independent Power Producer Procurement Programme (REIPPPP) initiated by the South African Department of Energy.

The Bokpoort Plant has a thermal molten salt storage capacity of 1‚300 MWh_{t} equivalent to around 9.3 hours full load generation. The plant synchronised for the first time on the South African Grid in November 2015, after a construction period of 29 months.

== History ==
On 23 September 2013 the groundbreaking ceremony for the commencement of construction at the Bokpoort Concentrated Solar Power plant was held in the presence of ACWA Power Chairman Mohammad Abunayyan, Mayor Paul Vries and other dignitaries in Groblershoop, South Africa.

Power developer ACWA Power Solafrica’s Bokpoort concentrated solar power (CSP) plant reached full operation capacity, ahead of schedule, in December 2015.

On 16 March 2016 Trade Ministers from South Africa and Saudi Arabia jointly inaugurated the Bokpoort Concentrated Solar Power (CSP) Project, marking the official launch of the R 5 billion ($339.93 million) project.

The South African solar power plant has set a new African record (25 March 2016) for the continuous, round the clock supply of renewable electricity for 161 hours.

On 29 April 2021 Revego Africa Energy Limited announced a 12 percent stake in the plant, for R 204 million ($14.8 million). Revego is buying the stake from Métier, a South Africa private equity firm, who manages the Lereko Metier Sustainable Capital fund.

== Technology ==
Bokpoort CSP has a gross capacity of 55 megawatts (MW) and 50 MW net. The solar field covers an area of less than 300 hectares (741 acres). With its 8600 solar collector elements (SCE) the solar field captures the solar energy. Through the heat-transfer fluid (HTF) circulating through large steam generators, the energy is transformed into steam at 103.6 bar and 380 °C. The 50MWe conventional steam turbine will then use the steam flow to generate electricity and two molten salt tanks will store excess heat energy for conversion into electric energy after sunshine hours.

=== Energy storage ===
One remarkable feature of the plant is the large energy storage capability. It is the world’s first commercial utility-scale CSP plant to have more than nine hours of storage, which provide the ability to deliver power well after sunset or when power demand is highest, effectively making it a peaking power plant. Bokpoort CSP Owners led by ACWA Power International (Saudi Arabia) describes this system as the largest thermal storage system ever built for a CSP plant of its size and capacity.

The Bokpoort thermal energy storage consists out of one hot and one cold storage tank (each 40 m diameter and 14 m height) filled with 39,100 tons of environmental friendly molten salt (potassium and sodium nitrate).

=== Solar field ===
The solar field consists out of 180 loops grouped into 8 sub-fields with a total of 8600 SCEs using SENER Trough Technology with Flabeg Glass Mirrors. There are in total 241,920 mirrors installed which have a total of 658,000 m2 of reflective surface.

== Construction ==
The plant was built, starting in September 2013, by the EPC consortium of Spanish companies Acciona, SENER and TSK and South Africa’s Crowie. During peak construction period the project employed more than 1300 persons on site.

=== Local content and skills transfer ===
Total estimated local value add (in ZAR) in form of local content and employment in South Africa was more than R 2 billion ($135.97 million), which equals about 41% of total project investment.

1. Main SA manufacturers
  - Gauteng – HTF Expansion / Overflow Vessels
  - Upington – Salt Tanks (Thermal Storage)
  - Gauteng / Cape Town – Torque Tubes, Pylons for Solar Field
    - Approx. 8160 tonnes of steel for all Torque Tube
    - Approx. 1200 tonnes of steel for all Pylons
1. Main SA Pre-Assemblers and On-site Assemblers
  - Upington – HTF Solar field piping
  - Upington – HCE Stainless steel piping
  - Northern Cape – HP Power Block Piping
  - On Site – Solar Collector Elements (7500)
2. Total estimated training performed 50,000 hours
  - Safety training – 20%
  - Small tools use – 20%
  - On job training and skill-specific training – 60% (scaffold use, foundation erection, welding setup, electrical cable pulling and termination)

== Socio-economic and community development ==
Bokpoort CSP became well known not only in the Northern Cape but also on national level for its innovative socio-economic and community development projects across pre-defined objectives such as education, self-sustainability, community well-being. Among other the following projects closely developed and implemented with the ǃKheis Local Municipality and its communities:

1. Duineveldt Solar Lighting; one of the key challenges identified by the !Kheis Municipality, in the Integrated Development Plan (IDP), is the lack of electricity to households
2. Palms Technical Training Centre; it became Bokpoort CSP's partner to train community members to provide basic skills for the CSP project or to prepare them to enrol in vocational training schools, which allows them to acquire specialist skills in power plant construction or maintenance environments.
3. Topline Water Reticulation; provision of clean drinking water to Topline community residents.
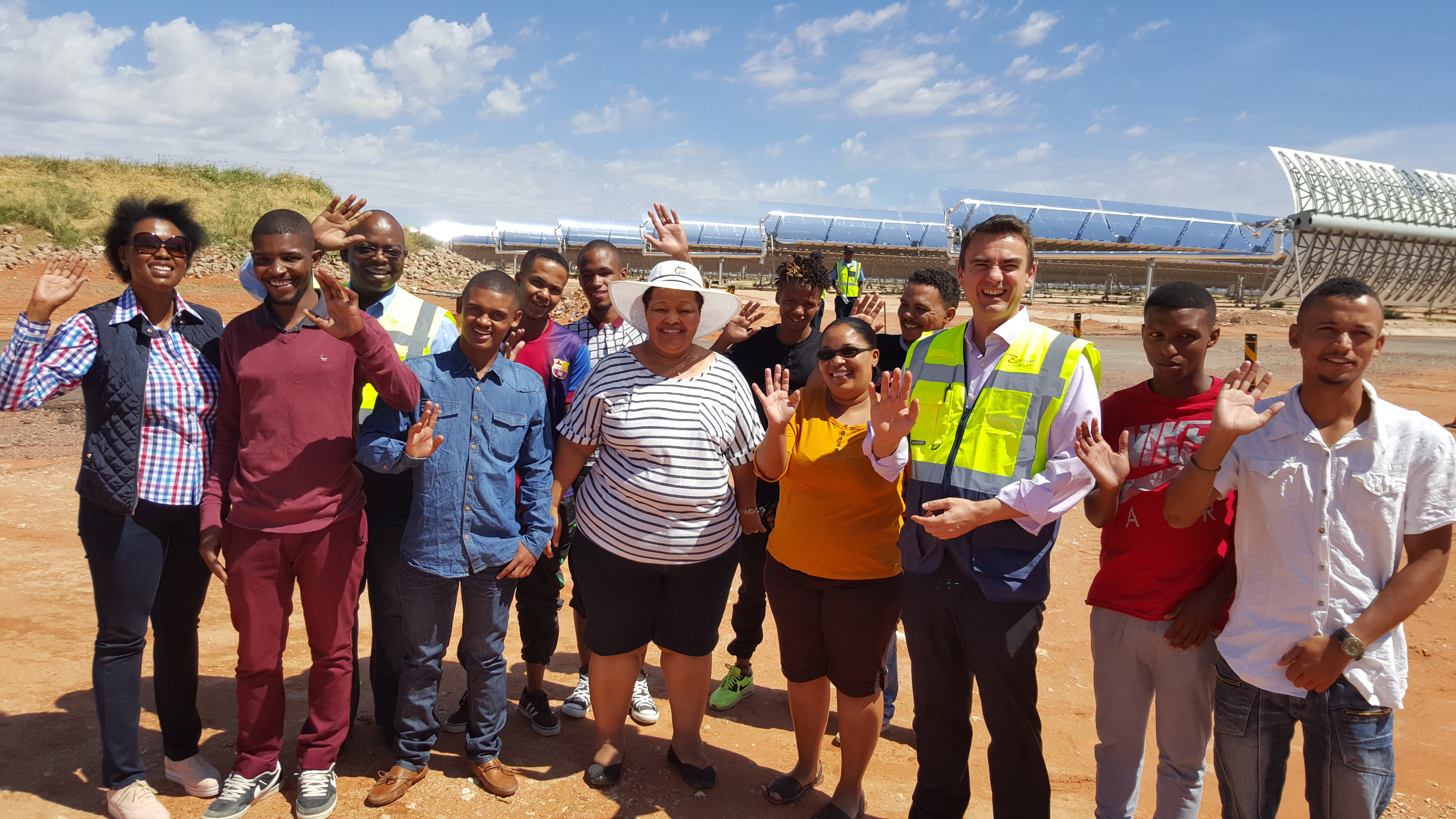
4. Northern Cape Premier Mrs Sylvia Lucas visits Bokpoort CSP apprentices to get feedback on Apprenticeship Program.
  Various Apprenticeship Programs
5. !Kheis loveLife Y-Centre

== Inauguration and commercial operation ==
Power developer ACWA Power Solafrica's Bokpoort concentrated solar power (CSP) plant reached full operation capacity – ahead of schedule in December 2015. ACWA Power Southern Africa Managing Director Chris Ehlers points out that the coordination between the owner, the engineering, procurement and construction contractor and Eskom, as well as other key partners, has been key in synchronising Bokpoort CSP slightly ahead of time with the national grid.

=== Inauguration ===
On 16 March 2016 Trade Ministers from South Africa and Saudi Arabia jointly inaugurated the Bokpoort Concentrated Solar Power (CSP) Project, marking the official launch of the R 5 billion ($339.93 million, 2016 exchange rate) project. South Africa’s Trade and Industry Minister, Mr. Rob Davies and Dr. Tawfig Fawzan Alrabiah, the Kingdom of Saudi Arabia’s Minister of Commerce & Trade officiated at the ceremony, at the site, which will provide enough power to supply more than 200,000 homes.

Speaking at the launch, Minister Davies said the Bokpoort project is the largest investment by a Saudi company, ACWA Power and needs to be celebrated as it instills confidence in government’s long-term infrastructure roll out and also strengthens relations between the two countries. "This project has a major socio-economic development impact for the Northern Cape and South Africa. Through the bid window process the overall prices of energy have become very competitive. The design of the Renewable Energy Independent Power Producers Procurement Programme (REIPPPP) is intended to leverage the investment in the energy sector to contribute to industrialization of the local economy," said Davies.

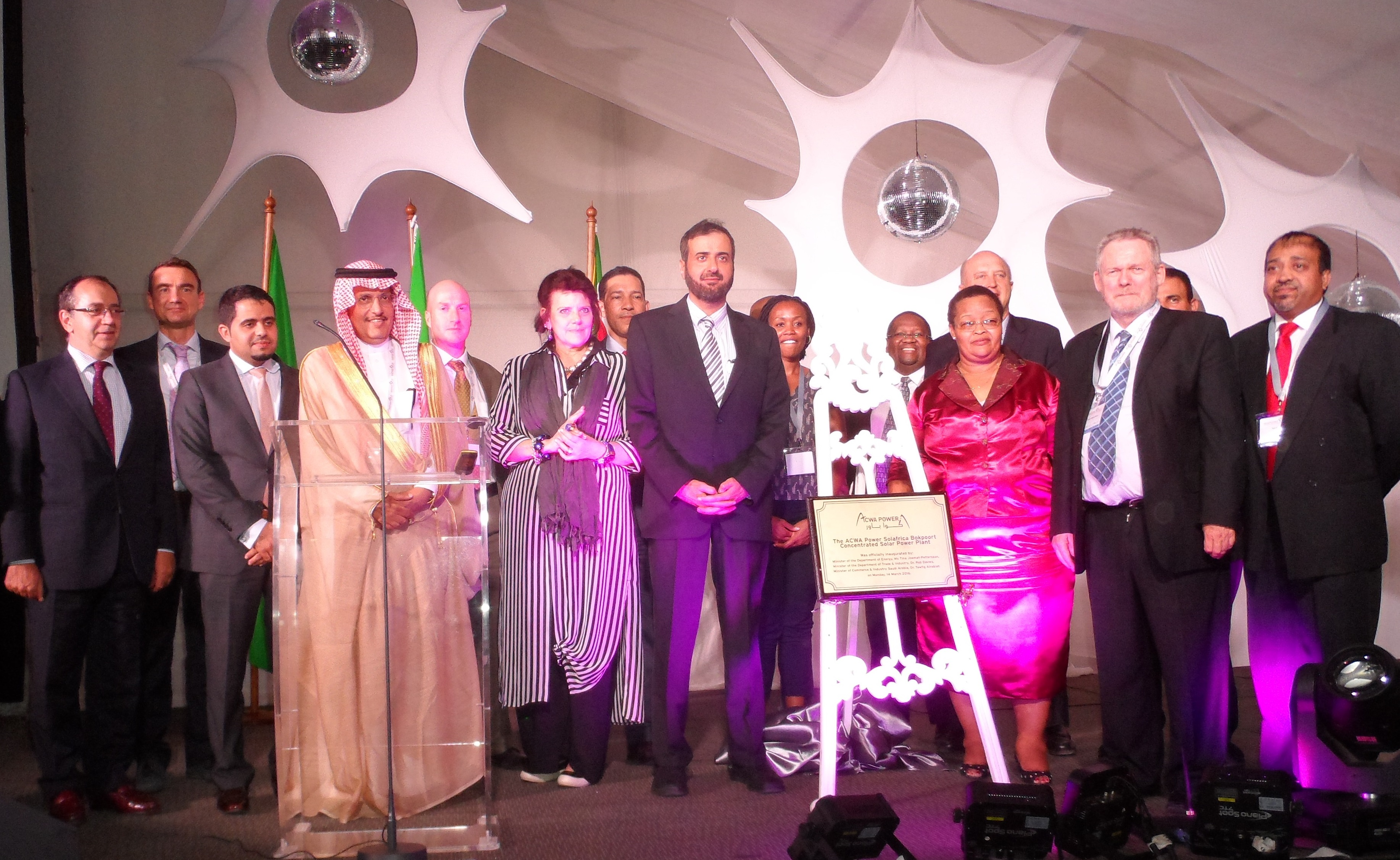
50 MW Bokpoort Concentrated Solar Power CSP Launch on 16 March 2016 Group

=== Commercial operation ===
The CEO for Bokpoort CSP, Mr Ryno Lacock was proud to announce that on 27 November 2017, the plant clocked production of 1009.31 MWh in a single day. This is the highest production ever over a single 24 hour period. The previous record was 999.13 MWh on 28 November 2016 which fell just short of the "Sweet Spot" of 1000 MWh per day which is equivalent to 20 hours of full load operations (with a 50MW turbine and a 9.3 hour storage system) akin to base-load technologies.

== Financing ==
In December 2020, Afrik21.africa reported that Acwa Power Solafrica Bokpoort, the SPV company that owns and operates the power station had refinanced the power station to the tune of ZAR:5 billion (US$334 million). The long list of lenders in the syndicated loan included: (1) Investec Bank (2) Absa Group Limited (3) Rand Merchant Bank (4) Omsfin (5) Sanlam and (6) Futuregrowth.

== Awards winning project ==
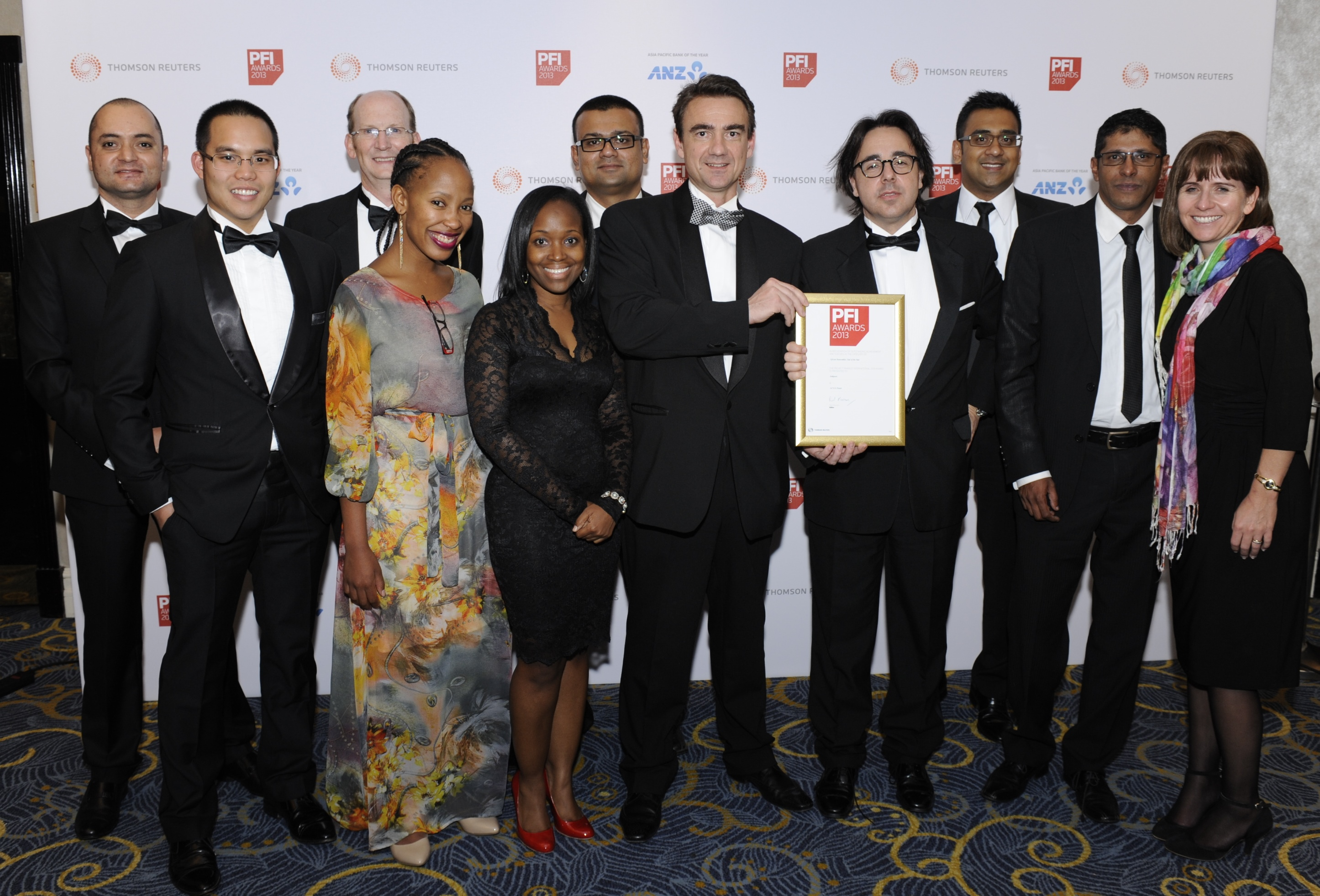
"2013 Renewable Deal of the Year for the Middle East and Africa region" award by Thomson Reuters’ Project Finance International (PFI) to Bokpoort CSP.

In 2014 Thomson Reuters’ Project Finance International (PFI) awarded the title "Renewable Deal of the Year for the Middle East and Africa region" to the 50MW Bokpoort concentrated solar power (CSP) project developed by the ACWA Power consortium.

The South African National Energy Association has announced ACWA Power SolAfrica Bokpoort CSP plant as the Best Energy Project of the Year 2016 on 16 September at the SANEA / SANEDI Awards ceremony in Sandton. The 50MW CSP plant in Northern Cape was considered as the industry’s pioneering project in the renewable energy sector. The project was also recognised as the industry benchmark for utilizing renewable energy deployment for socio-economic development through focused investment in local community development.

== See also ==
- List of solar thermal power stations
- List of power stations in South Africa
- List of energy storage projects
- ACWA Power
