= Solar Energy Generating Systems =

Concentrated solar thermal power station in the Mojave Desert of California

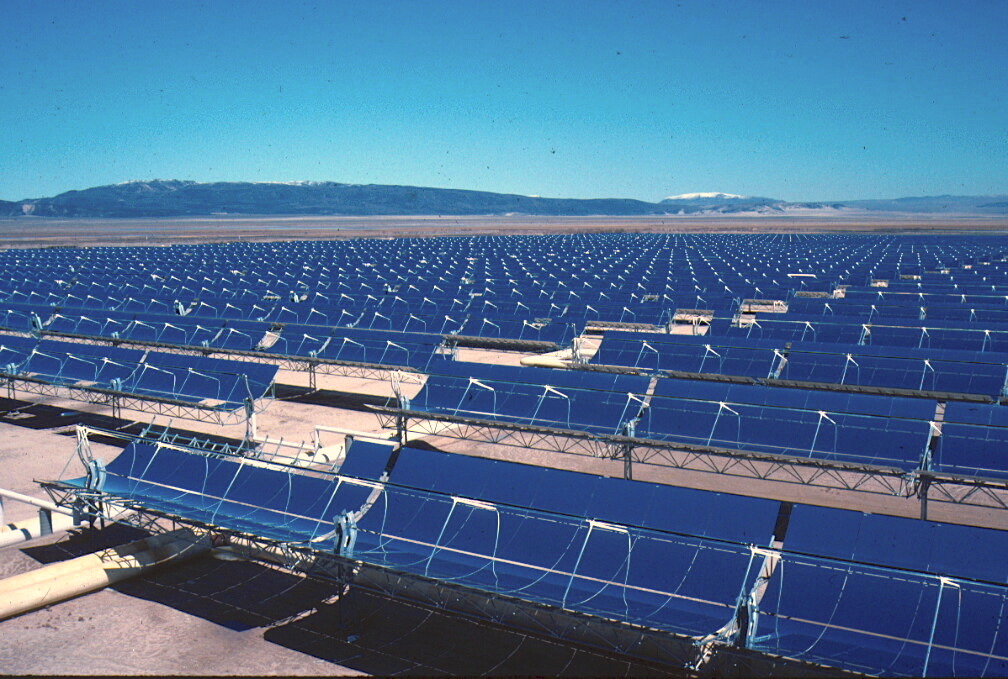
- Part of the 354 MW SEGS solar complex in northern San Bernardino County, California
- Country: United States
- Location: Mojave Desert
- Coordinates: 35.0316°N 117.348°W
- Status: Operational
- Construction began: 1983
- Commission date: 1984
- Owner: NextEra Energy Resources

Solar farm
- Type: CSP
- CSP technology: Parabolic trough
- Collectors: 936,384
- Site resource: 2,725 kWh/m^{2}/yr
- Site area: 1,600 acres (647.5 ha)

Power generation
- Units operational: 2
- Units decommissioned: 7
- Nameplate capacity: 160 MW
- Capacity factor: 19.2%
- Annual net output: 539 GW·h (2015)

Solar Energy Generating Systems (SEGS) is a concentrated solar power plant in California, United States. With the combined capacity from three separate locations at 354 megawatt (MW), it was for thirty years the world's largest solar thermal energy generating facility, until the commissioning of the even larger Ivanpah facility in 2014. It was also for thirty years the world's largest solar generating facility of any type of technology, until the commissioning of the photovoltaic Topaz Solar Farm in 2014. It consisted of nine solar power plants in California's Mojave Desert, where insolation is among the best available in the United States.

SEGS I–II (44 MW) were located at Daggett (34°51′45″N 116°49′45″W); they have been replaced with a solar photovoltaic farm.

SEGS III–VII (150 MW) were installed at Kramer Junction (35°00′43″N 117°33′32″W); all five SEGS have undergone demolition.

SEGS VIII–IX (160 MW) are located at Harper Lake (35°01′55″N 117°20′50″W). NextEra Energy Resources operates and partially owns the plants located at Kramer Junction. On January 26, 2018, the SEGS VIII and IX at Harper Lake were sold to renewable energy company Terra-Gen, LLC.

A tenth plant (SEGS X, 80 MW) had been in construction and SEGS XI and SEGS XII had been planned by Luz Industries, but the developer filed for bankruptcy in 1992, because it was unable to secure construction financing. The site of SEGS X was later licensed for a solar photovoltaic farm, Lockhart Solar PV II.

Most of the thermal facilities were retired by 2021, and photovoltaics were built on the same sites.

== Plants' scale and operations ==
Before retirement and replacement of SEGS I-VII with solar photovoltaics, the plants had a 354 MW net (394 MW gross) installed capacity. The nameplate capacity, which operating continuously, would dеliver the samе net power output, coming only from the solar source was around 75 MWe —, representing a 21% capacity factor. In addition, the turbines could be utilized at night by burning natural gas.

NextEra claimed in 2009 that the solar plants could power 232,500 homеs (during the day, at peak power) and displace 3,800 tons of pollution pеr year that would have been produced if the electricity had been providеd by fossil fuels, such as oil.

The facilities had a total of 936,384 mirrors and cover more than 1,600 acres (647.5 ha). Lined up, the parabolic mirrors would have extended over 229 miles (369 km).

As an example of cost, in 2002, one of the 30 MW Kramer Junction sites required $90 million to construct, and its operation and maintenance cost was about $3 million per year (4.6 cents per kilowatt hour).

== Principle of operation ==
Sketch of a parabolic trough collector

The installation uses parabolic trough, solar thermal technology along with natural gas to generate electricity. About 90% of the electricity is produced by the sunlight. Natural gas is only used when the solar power is insufficient to meet the demand from Southern California Edison, the distributor of power in southern California.

=== Mirrors ===
The sun shines on glass panels, which are 94% reflective, unlike a typical mirror, which is only 70% reflective. The mirrors automatically track the sun throughout the day. The greatest source of mirror breakage is wind, with 3,000 mirrors typically replaced each year. Operators can turn the mirrors to protect them during intense wind storms. An automated washing mechanism is used to periodically clean the parabolic reflective panels. The term "field area" is assessed as the actual collector area.

=== Heat transfer ===
The sunlight bounces off the mirrors and is directed to a central tube filled with synthetic oil, which heats to over 400 °C (750 °F). The reflected light focused at the central tube is 71 to 80 times more intense than the ordinary sunlight. The synthetic oil transfers its heat to water, which boils and drives the Rankine cycle steam turbine, thereby generating electricity. Synthetic oil is used to carry the heat (instead of water) to keep the pressure within manageable parameters.

== Individual locations ==
The SEGS power plants were built by Luz Industries, and commissioned between December 20, 1984 and October 1, 1990. After Luz Industries' bankruptcy in 1991 plants were sold to various investor groups as individual projects, and expansion including three more plants was halted.

Kramer Junction employs about 95 people, and 45 people work at Harper Lake.

SEGS plant history and operational data (1985–1990)
Plant	Year built	Location	Turbine capacity		Field area	Oil temperature	Gross solar production of electricity (MWh)					
Plant	Year built	Location	Net (MW)	Gross (MW)	(m^{2})	(°C)	1985	1986	1987	1988	1989	1990
SEGS I	1984	Daggett	14	14	82,960	307	19,261	22,510	25,055	16,927	23,527	21,491
SEGS II	1985	Daggett	30	33	190,338	316		25,085	23,431	38,914	43,862	39,156
SEGS III	1986	Kramer Jct.	30	33	230,300	349			49,444	61,475	63,096	69,410
SEGS IV	1986	Kramer Jct.	30	33	230,300	349			52,181	64,762	70,552	74,661
SEGS V	1987	Kramer Jct.	30	33	250,500	349				62,858	65,280	72,449
SEGS VI	1988	Kramer Jct.	30	35	188,000	390					48,045	62,690
SEGS VII	1988	Kramer Jct.	30	35	194,280	390					38,868	57,661
SEGS VIII	1989	Harper Lake	80	89	464,340	390						114,996
SEGS IX	1990	Harper Lake	80	89	483,960	390						5,974
Total			354	394	2,314,978		19,261	47,595	150,111	244,937	353,230	518,487
Sources: Solargenix Energy, KJC Operating Company, IEEE, NREL

SEGS plant history and operational data (1991–2002)
Gross solar production of electricity (MWh)
Plant	1991	1992	1993	1994	1995	1996	1997	1998	1999	2000	2001	2002	average 1998–2002	Total
SEGS I	20,252	17,938	20,368	20,194	19,800	19,879	19,228	18,686	11,250	17,235	17,947	17,402	16,500	348,950
SEGS II	35,168	32,481	36,882	36,566	35,853	35,995	34,817	33,836	33,408	31,207	32,497	31,511	32,500	571,696
SEGS III	60,134	48,702	58,248	56,892	56,663	64,170	64,677	70,598	70,689	65,994	69,369	66,125	68,555	995,686
SEGS IV	64,600	51,007	58,935	57,795	54,929	61,970	64,503	71,635	71,142	63,457	64,842	70,313	68,278	1,017,283
SEGS V	59,009	55,383	67,685	66,255	63,757	71,439	75,936	75,229	70,293	73,810	71,826	73,235	72,879	1,014,444
SEGS VI	64,155	47,087	55,724	56,908	63,650	71,409	70,019	67,358	71,066	68,543	67,339	64,483	67,758	878,476
SEGS VII	58,373	46,940	54,110	53,251	61,220	70,138	69,186	67,651	66,258	64,195	64,210	62,196	65,048	834,986
SEGS VIII	102,464	109,361	130,999	134,578	133,843	139,174	136,410	137,905	135,233	140,079	137,754	138,977	137,990	1,691,773
SEGS IX	144,805	129,558	130,847	137,915	138,959	141,916	139,697	119,732	107,513	128,315	132,051	137,570	125,036	1,594,852
Total	608,960	538,458	613,798	620,358	628,674	676,091	674,473	662,631	636,851	652,835	657,834	662,542	654,539	8,967,123
Sources: Solargenix Energy, KJC Operating Company, IEEE, NREL

SEGS plant history and operational data (2003–2014)
Net solar production of electricity (MWh)
Plant	2003	2004	2005	2006	2007	2008	2009	2010	2011	2012	2013	2014	Average 2003–2014	Total
SEGS I	6,913	8,421	6,336	5,559	0	10,705	9,033	10,648	11,164	11,666	9,403	8,583	8,203	98,431
SEGS II	11,142	14,582	13,375	7,547	5,445	28,040	18,635	22,829	26,198	25,126	23,173	7,611	16,975	203,703
SEGS III	59,027	64,413	56,680	51,721	59,480	69,012	62,971	60,029	61,350	56,877	56,824	54,407	59,399	712,791
SEGS IV	58,100	62,006	56,349	52,439	59,799	69,338	63,563	63,084	57,684	62,414	58,317	54,321	59,785	717,414
SEGS V	61,921	67,717	62,309	53,471	59,547	69,316	59,820	54,328	60,451	62,877	57,758	56,354	60,489	725,869
SEGS VI	50,504	53,618	51,827	45,076	65,832	67,156	62,750	63,576	59,327	56,082	52,539	50,547	56,570	678,834
SEGS VII	49,154	50,479	46,628	42,050	58,307	65,185	58,950	58,836	57,378	54,147	48,183	46,762	53,005	636,059
SEGS VIII	119,357	124,089	120,282	117,451	122,676	135,492	131,474	155,933	152,463	145,247	141,356	145,525	134,279	1,611,345
SEGS IX	115,541	123,605	120,915	117,310	122,699	150,362	139,756	163,899	160,506	164,203	154,082	147,883	140,063	1,680,761
Total	531,659	568,930	534,701	492,624	553,785	664,606	606,952	653,162	646,521	638,639	601,635	571,993	588,767	7,065,207

SEGS plant history and operational data (2015–2021)
Net solar production of electricity (MWh)
Plant	2015	2016	2017	2018	2019	2020	2021	Total	Total 1985–2021
SEGS I	12,562	dec.	(PV)	(PV)	(PV)	(PV)	(PV)	12,562	459,943
SEGS II	dec.	dec.	(PV)	(PV)	(PV)	(PV)	(PV)	0	775,399
SEGS III	52,073	46,582	44,115	43,849	38,242	0	dec.	224,861	1,933,518
SEGS IV	53,117	49,034	43,182	44,406	41,865	0	dec.	231,604	1,969,301
SEGS V	52,646	50,142	43,934	47,383	41,424	0	dec.	235,529	1,975,842
SEGS VI	46,937	40,923	36,380	34,262	0	0	dec.	158,502	1,715,812
SEGS VII	37,771	30,480	32,601	27,956	0	0	dec.	128,808	1,599,852
SEGS VIII	138,149	140,849	123,451	132,871	120,530	114,557	81,699	852,106	4,189,538
SEGS IX	145,863	142,867	131,268	137,564	124,375	122,045	116,013	919,995	4,161,294
Total	539,118	500,877	454,931	468,291	366,254	236,602	197,712	2,754,405	18,780,499
In 2017, SEGS I was replaced by PV system Sunray 2, and SEGS II by PV system Sunray 3.

=== Harper Lake ===
Until Ivanpah Solar Power Facility was commissioned in 2014, SEGS VIII and SEGS IX, located at 35°01′55″N 117°20′50″W were the largest solar thermal power plants individually and collectively in the world. They were the last, the largest, and the most advanced of the nine plants at SEGS, designed to take advantage of the economies of scale. Construction of the tenth plant in the same locality was halted because of the bankruptcy of Luz Industries. Construction of the approved eleventh and twelfth plants never started. Each of the three planned plants would have had 80 MW of installed capacity. Abengoa Solar recently constructed the 280MW Mojave Solar Project (MSP) adjacent to the SEGS VIII and SEGS IX plants. The MSP also uses concentrating solar thermal trough technology.

Starting in February 2020, SEGS VIII no longer burned natural gas. The last production month was October 2021. SEGS IX stopped burning natural gas starting in October 2020, except for January 2021.

=== Kramer Junction ===
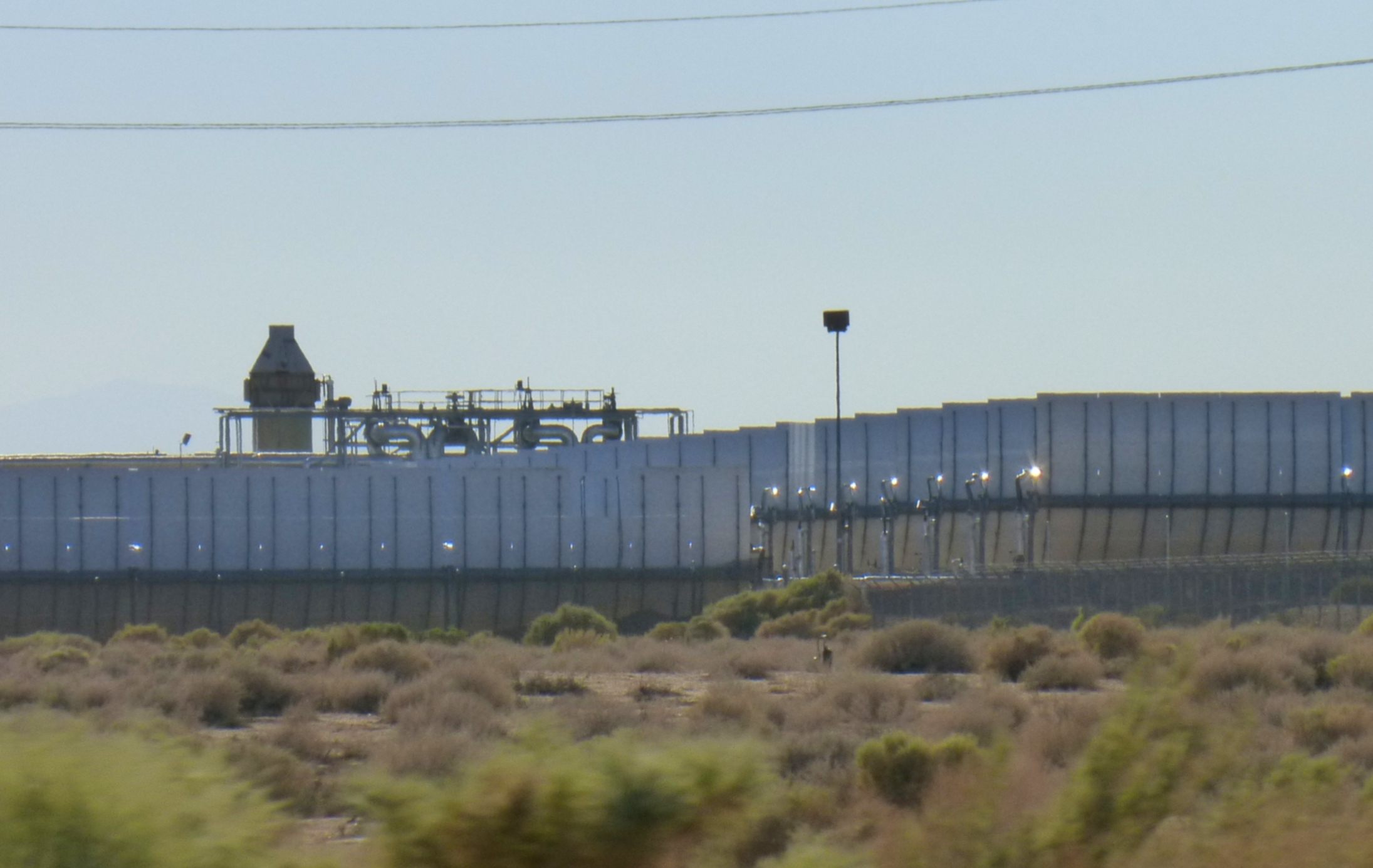
The reflectors at Kramer Junction site facing the western sky to focus the late afternoon sunlight at the absorber tubes, partially seen in the picture as bright white spots

This location (35°00′48″N 117°33′38″W) receives an average of 340 days of sunshine per year, which makes it an ideal place for solar power generation. The average direct normal radiation (DNR) is 7.44 kWh/m^{2}/day (310 W/m^{2}), one of the best in the nation. This was the location of SEGS II - VII, which were retired in 2019. As of 2021, they were going to be replaced with a new solar photovoltaic array called Resurgence I.

=== Daggett ===
SEGS I and II were located at 34°51′47″N 116°49′37″W and owned by Cogentrix Energy (Carlyle Group). SEGS II was shut down in 2014 and was replaced by Sunray 3 (EIA plant code 10438), a 13,8 MW photovoltaic system. SEGS I was shut down one year later and replaced by 20 MW PV system Sunray 2 (EIA plant code 10437). Sunray 2 and Sunray 3 started production in 2017 as per EIA data.

== Accidents and incidents ==
In February 1999, a 900,000-US-gallon (3,400 m^{3}) mineral oil storage tank exploded at the SEGS I (Daggett) solar power plant, sending flames and smoke into the sky. Authorities were trying to keep flames away from two adjacent containers that held sulfuric acid and sodium hydroxide. The immediate area of 0.5 square miles (1.3 km^{2}) was evacuated.

== See also ==
- List of concentrating solar thermal power companies
- List of photovoltaic power stations
- List of solar thermal power stations
- Renewable energy in the United States
- Renewable portfolio standard
- Solar power
- Solar power plants in the Mojave Desert
- List of largest power stations in the world
- Solana Generating Station
