= Kathu Solar Park =

Concentrated solar power station in Northern Cape, South Africa

- Country: South Africa
- Location: Kathu, John Taolo Gaetsewe District Municipality
- Coordinates: 27.6135°S 23.0426°E
- Status: Operational
- Construction began: May 2016
- Commission date: 30 January 2019

Solar farm
- Type: CSP
- CSP technology: Parabolic Reflectors
- Site area: 800 hectares (1,977 acres)

Power generation
- Nameplate capacity: 100 MW
- Capacity factor: 44.5%
- Annual net output: 390 GWh (expected)
- Storage capacity: 450 MW·h_{e}

External links
- Website: kathu solar park

Kathu Solar Park is a concentrated solar power (CSP) thermal energy power plant, located near Kathu in the Northern Cape province of South Africa.

It has a capacity of 100.0 megawatts (MW), and full-load molten storage capacity of 4.5 hours. It covers an area of approximately 800 hectares (1,977 acres).

The project shareholders, led by Engie include the Public Investment Corporation, SIOC Community Development Trust, Development Bank of Southern Africa, Investec, Lereko Metier and the Kathu Trust. The plant was constructed by the consortium formed by Acciona and SENER, acting as Engineering, Procurement and Construction (EPC) provider.

The plant began commercial operations in January 2019, and currently supplies power for an estimated 179,000 households in South Africa.

== See also ==
- List of solar thermal power stations
- List of power stations in South Africa
