= Andasol solar power station =

Concentrated solar thermal power station in Spain

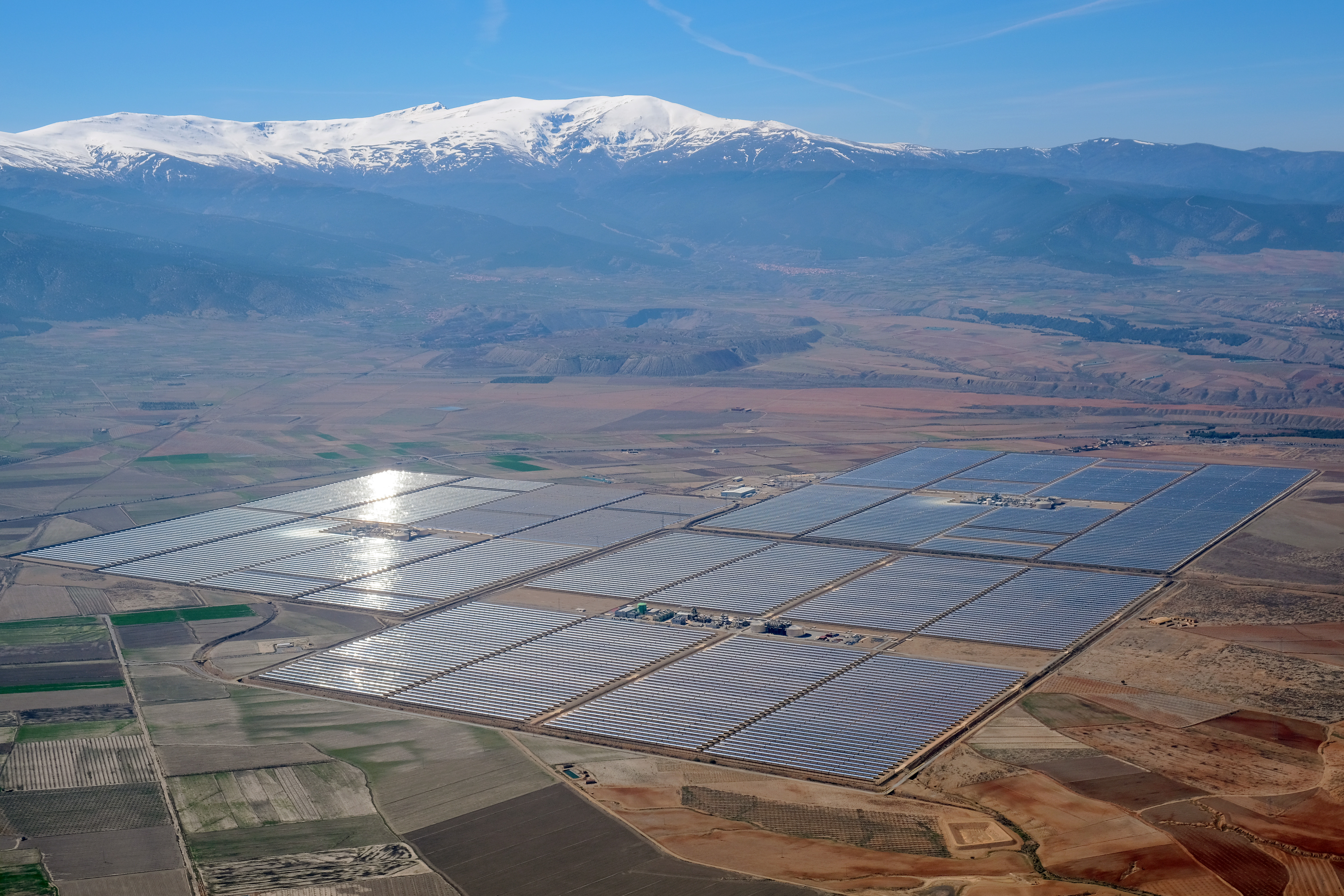
- Andasol solar power station
- Official name: Central Termosolar Andasol
- Country: Spain
- Location: near Guadix, Granada
- Coordinates: 37°13′23″N 3°03′37″W
- Status: Operational
- Commission date: 2009
- Owners: Cubico Sustainable Investments (Andasol 1 and 2); Stadtwerke München; MAN Ferrostaal; Innogy

Solar farm
- Type: CSP
- CSP technology: Parabolic trough
- Site resource: 2,136 kWh/m^{2}/yr
- Site area: 600 hectares (1,483 acres)

Power generation
- Nameplate capacity: 149.7 MW
- Capacity factor: 37.7%
- Annual net output: 495 GWh
- Storage capacity: 1,123 MW·h_{e}

External links
- Commons: Related media on Commons

The Andasol solar power station is a 150-megawatt (MW) concentrated solar power station and Europe's first commercial plant to use parabolic troughs. It is located near Guadix in Andalusia, Spain, and its name is a portmanteau of Andalusia and Sol (Sun in Spanish). The Andasol plant uses tanks of molten salt as thermal energy storage to continue generating electricity, irrespective of whether the sun is shining or not.

== Description ==
Andasol consists of three projects: Andasol-1 (completed 2008), Andasol-2 (completed 2009) and Andasol-3 (completed 2011). Each project generates approximately 165 GW-h each per year (a total of 495 GW-h for all three combined), with a gross electricity output of 50 MW_{e} and 49.9 MW_{e} net. This gives the plant a combined power output of 150 MW_{e}. The collectors installed have a combined surface area of 51 hectares; it occupies about 200 ha of land. Andasol is the first parabolic trough power plant in Europe. Because of the high altitude (1,100 m) and the semi-arid climate, the site has exceptionally high annual direct insolation of 2,200 kWh/m^{2} per year.

Andasol has a thermal storage system which absorbs part of the heat produced in the solar field during the day. This heat is then stored in a molten salt mixture of 60% sodium nitrate and 40% potassium nitrate. This process almost doubles the number of operational hours at the solar thermal power plant per year. Each unit fully loaded storage system holds 1,010 MW·h_{t} of heat, enough to run the turbine and produce electricity for about 7.5 hours at full-load, in case of overcast skies or after sunset. The heat reservoirs each consist of two tanks measuring 14 m in height and 36 m in diameter and containing molten salt. Andasol 1 is able to supply environmentally friendly solar electricity for up to 200,000 people.

The total cost of building the three projects was estimated at €900 million.

== Rationale ==
Andasol 1 cost around €300 million (US$380 million) to build. Thermal energy storage costs roughly US$50 per kWh of capacity (150 lbs of salt per kWh at a storage temperature of 400 °C), according to Greg Glatzmaier of the U.S. National Renewable Energy Laboratory (NREL), totaling about 13% of Andasol's initial cost.

The developers say Andasol's electricity will cost €0.271 per kilowatt-hour (kW·h) to produce. Under current government policy in Spain, solar-thermal electricity will receive a feed-in tariff of just under €0.27/kW·h for the next 25 years.

Like every power plant with a thermal engine, cooling is needed for the working fluid. As Andasol is built in the warm middle of the south of Spain, every Andasol unit vaporizes 870,000 cubic metres (1,140,000 cu yd) water per year (according to the developer), or 5 L/kWh (1.3 USgal/kWh). Most power plants vaporize less water (typically less than 2.5 L/kWh), or close to none if they are cooled by river or sea water. Although water supply is generally a problem in Spain, Andasol has ample supply due to its location near the Sierra Nevada mountain range.

== Developers ==
=== Andasol 1 and 2 ===
The developer of the Andasol 1 and Andasol 2 plants are Solar Millennium (25%) and ACS Cobra (75%). After planning, engineering and construction Solar Millennium sold their shares to ACS Group.

In 2017, the two international funds, Antin Infrastructure Partners and Deutsche Asset Management's infrastructure investment business, and the Spanish construction company Cobra Sistemas y Redes, sold full ownership to Cubico Sustainable Investments Limited.

In 2018, the ICSID – the World Bank's International Centre for Settlement of Investment Disputes – issued a ruling that required Spain to pay €112 million to Antin Infrastructure Partners, which had claimed €218 million over the cuts to renewable energies subsidies in 2010.

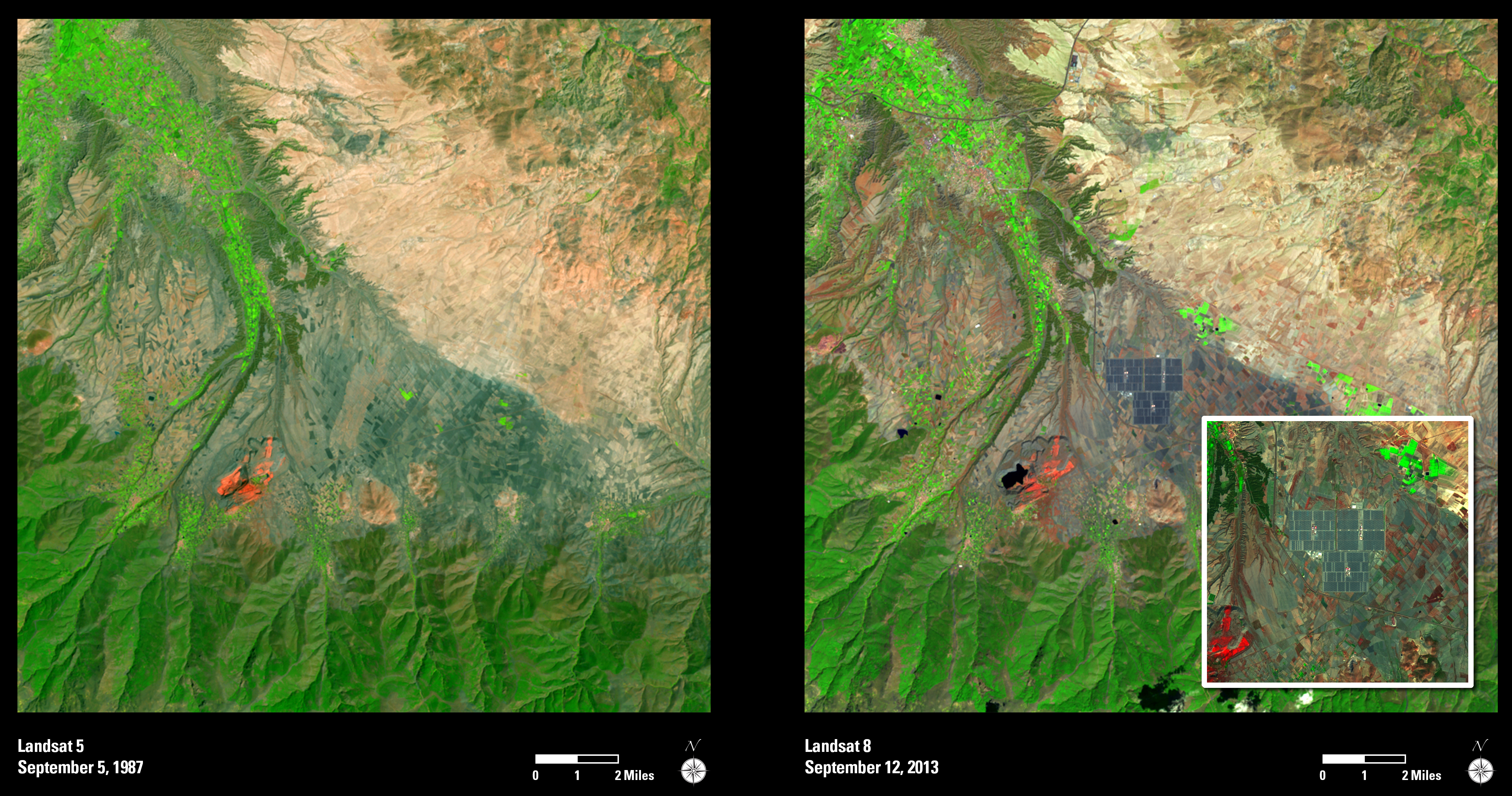
Satellite images of the site

=== Andasol 3 ===
Andasol 3 is developed by the consortium of Solar Millennium and MAN Ferrostaal. Marquesado Solar SL is the investor consortium which is going to commission and operate Andasol 3. Shareholders of Marquesado Solar SL are:

- Stadtwerke München (48.9%)
- MAN Ferrostaal AG (26%)
- Innogy & RheinEnergie AG (25.1%)

== See also ==
- List of solar thermal power stations
- Renewable energy in the European Union
- Sener Aeronáutica
- Solar power in Spain
- Solar thermal energy
- Wind power in Spain
