= Ghassate =

- commune
- Interactive map of Ghassate
- Country: Morocco
- Region: Drâa Tafilalt
- Province: Ouarzazate

Population (2004)
  - Total: 8,815
- Time zone: UTC+0 (GMT)

Ghassate is a commune in the Ouarzazate Province of the Souss-Massa-Drâa administrative region of Morocco. At the time of the 2004 census, the commune had a total population of 8815 people living in 1233 households.
