= Stirling Energy Systems =

Renewable energy developer

- Founded: 1996
- Defunct: 2011
- Headquarters: Scottsdale, Arizona
- Products: Solar energy
- Parent: NTR

Stirling Energy Systems was a Scottsdale, Arizona-based company which developed equipment for utility-scale renewable energy power plants and distributed electrical generating systems using parabolic dish and stirling engine technology, touted as the highest efficiency solar technology.

In April 2008, Ireland-based NTR purchased a majority stake in Stirling Energy Systems for $100M. As of 8/3/2011 NTR reported they were seeking 3rd party investment in Stirling Energy Systems.

On 29 September 2011 Stirling Energy Systems filed for Chapter 7 bankruptcy, due to falling PV prices caused by subsidized Chinese Photo Voltaic.

In April 2012 the Maricopa Solar plant in Phoenix, Arizona was bought by United Sun Systems (Now TEXEL Energy Storage) in a joint venture with a Chinese/American corporation.

== Overview ==
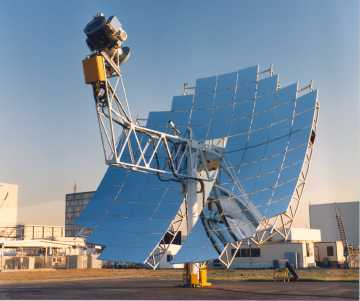
Dish Stirling from SES

According to their website, Stirling Energy Systems (SES) was a systems integration and project management company that is developing equipment for utility-scale renewable energy power plants and distributed electric generating systems ("gensets"). SES is teamed with Kockums Submarine Systems, NASA-Glenn Research Center, the U.S. Department of Energy (DOE), and The Boeing Company for solar power plants. SES claimed it was positioned to become a premier worldwide renewable energy technology company to meet the global demand for renewable electric generating technologies through the commercialization of its stirling cycle engine technology for solar power generation applications.

== Bankruptcy ==
According to media reports, on 29 September 2011, Stirling Energy Systems filed for Chapter 7 bankruptcy as the Stirling dish technology could not compete against the falling costs of solar photovoltaics. The falling photovoltaic prices were caused by Chinese subsidies.

In April 2012 the Maricopa Solar plant in Phoenix, Arizona was bought by a European formation based in London called United Sun Systems.

At the beginning of 2011 Stirling Energy's development arm, Tessera Solar, sold off its two large projects, the 709 MW Imperial Valley Solar Project and the 850 MW Calico Solar Energy Project to AES Solar and K.Road, respectively.

== See also ==
- Solar power plants in the Mojave Desert
