= Guazhou Thermosolar Plant =

Concentrated solar power plant in Gansu, China

Dual-Tower Single-Unit Solar Thermal Energy Storage Power Station
- Official name: 双塔一机光热储能电站
- Country: China
- Location: Guazhou County, Jiuquan, Gansu
- Status: Under construction
- Commission date: October 2025 (full-system trial operation)
- Owners: China Three Gorges Corporation / SunSum Technology Co., Ltd. (joint venture)
- Operators: Three Gorges SunSum (Jiuquan) New Energy Power Generation Co., Ltd.

Solar farm
- Type: CSP
- CSP technology: Solar power tower
- Collectors: ~26,944–30,000 (reported variously)
- Total collector area: 800,000 m^{2} (80 ha)

Power generation
- Nameplate capacity: 100 MW
- Storage capacity: 6 hours at full load (100 MW unit)

The Dual-Tower Single-Unit Solar Thermal Energy Storage Power Station (Chinese: 双塔一机光热储能电站), also referred to in English-language sources as a "dual-tower, single-turbine" or "dual-tower single-machine" concentrated solar power (CSP) plant, is a molten-salt solar power tower facility located in Guazhou County, Jiuquan, Gansu Province, China. It is reported by its developer and by industry press to be the world's first CSP station in which two separate solar receiver towers feed a single steam turbine.

The 100 MW CSP unit is one component of a larger 700 MW "Solar Thermal Energy Storage+" hybrid renewable energy base, which also includes a 400 MW wind farm and a 200 MW photovoltaic power station. The project is developed by Three Gorges SunSum (Jiuquan) New Energy Power Generation Co., Ltd., a joint venture between the state-owned China Three Gorges Corporation and SunSum Technology Co., Ltd. (also transliterated in some sources as Hengji Nengmai or Hengji Energy Pulse).

== History ==
Construction of the project began as part of a first batch of large-scale renewable energy bases under China's 14th Five-Year Plan. By July 2023, foundation work on the two receiver towers, the main plant buildings, and molten-salt tanks was under way, with a heliostat mirror assembly workshop also under construction; the developer originally targeted grid connection by the end of 2023.

By July 2024, the plant was reported to be approximately 90 percent complete and had entered commissioning and testing, with the operator targeting first power generation later that year.

According to a February 2025 report in the Gansu Daily, reproduced by the China Solar Thermal Alliance (CSTA), the plant's main transformer and transmission lines had been energized and commissioning had entered its "final sprint," with grid connection expected in the first half of 2025.

In October 2025, the operator announced that the station had begun full-system trial operation, with both 200-metre receiver towers ignited simultaneously to confirm readiness for stable operation. The event was reported internationally as the launch of the world's first dual-tower, single-turbine solar thermal power station.

== Design and technology ==
The station uses molten salt tower CSP technology with two separate receiver towers, approximately 200 m (660 ft) tall and located about 1 km (0.62 mi) apart, which both supply heat to a single 100 MW steam turbine. This "dual-tower, single-turbine" arrangement is described by SolarPACES as a way to avoid the optical attenuation losses that affect very large single-tower CSP plants, in which heliostats far from the tower lose efficiency; by splitting the field into two smaller-radius sub-fields, the plant aims to maintain higher optical efficiency without needing a second, separate power block.

Nearly 27,000 heliostats (reported variously as approximately 26,944 to 30,000 mirrors in different sources) are arranged in two overlapping circular fields, with a combined heliostat collection area of roughly 800,000 m^{2} (80 ha). The heliostat mirrors are made of ultra-clear glass with a reported reflective efficiency of about 94 percent. Because the two fields partly overlap, heliostats in the shared area can reflect sunlight to the east tower in the morning and to the west tower in the afternoon, which the developer and CSTA state increases overall optical efficiency by roughly 24 percent compared with a conventional single-tower design of equivalent scale (an earlier project estimate cited a figure of approximately 23.94 percent). Overlapping the fields also reduces the total number of heliostats required, which is significant because heliostats account for a large share of total CSP plant construction costs, reported as up to 60 percent.

Solar heat collected by the towers is stored in liquid molten salt, reported at temperatures of approximately 565 to 570 °C (1,049 to 1,058 °F). The molten-salt thermal storage system is sized to allow the 100 MW turbine to operate at full load for approximately six hours after sunset or during cloudy conditions, using stored heat to generate steam. Sources differ slightly on tower height, with most reporting approximately 200 metres, while the CSTA report describes the towers as having a "central elevation" of 190 metres.

The steam turbine unit has a rated capacity of 100 MW and, according to an early technical description translated by SolarPACES, uses an ultra-high-pressure configuration with intermediate reheat and a direct air-cooled condensing design.

In 2024, an article published in the journal Applied Research examined dual-tower CSP plants generally, using the Guazhou project as a case study, and concluded that splitting a large heliostat field between two towers can reduce optical spillage losses and increase overall optical efficiency relative to a conventional single-tower plant of equivalent capacity, while noting that these gains must be weighed against the added capital cost of constructing a second tower and receiver.

== Role in the wider energy base and expected output ==
The CSP unit is designed to operate alongside the co-located 400 MW wind farm and 200 MW photovoltaic station, which had already achieved full-capacity grid connection as of the plant's October 2025 trial-operation announcement. The CSP station is intended to provide peak-regulation and energy-storage functions for the hybrid base, releasing stored thermal energy to generate electricity when wind and solar photovoltaic output is low, helping to smooth power delivery to the grid.

Once fully operational, the overall 700 MW project is projected to generate about 1.8 billion kilowatt-hours of electricity annually and to reduce CO_{2} emissions by approximately 1.53 million tonnes per year.

== See also ==
- Concentrated solar power
- Solar power tower
- Ivanpah Solar Electric Generating System
- Renewable energy in China
