= Parabolic trough =

Technology used in concentrated solar power stations

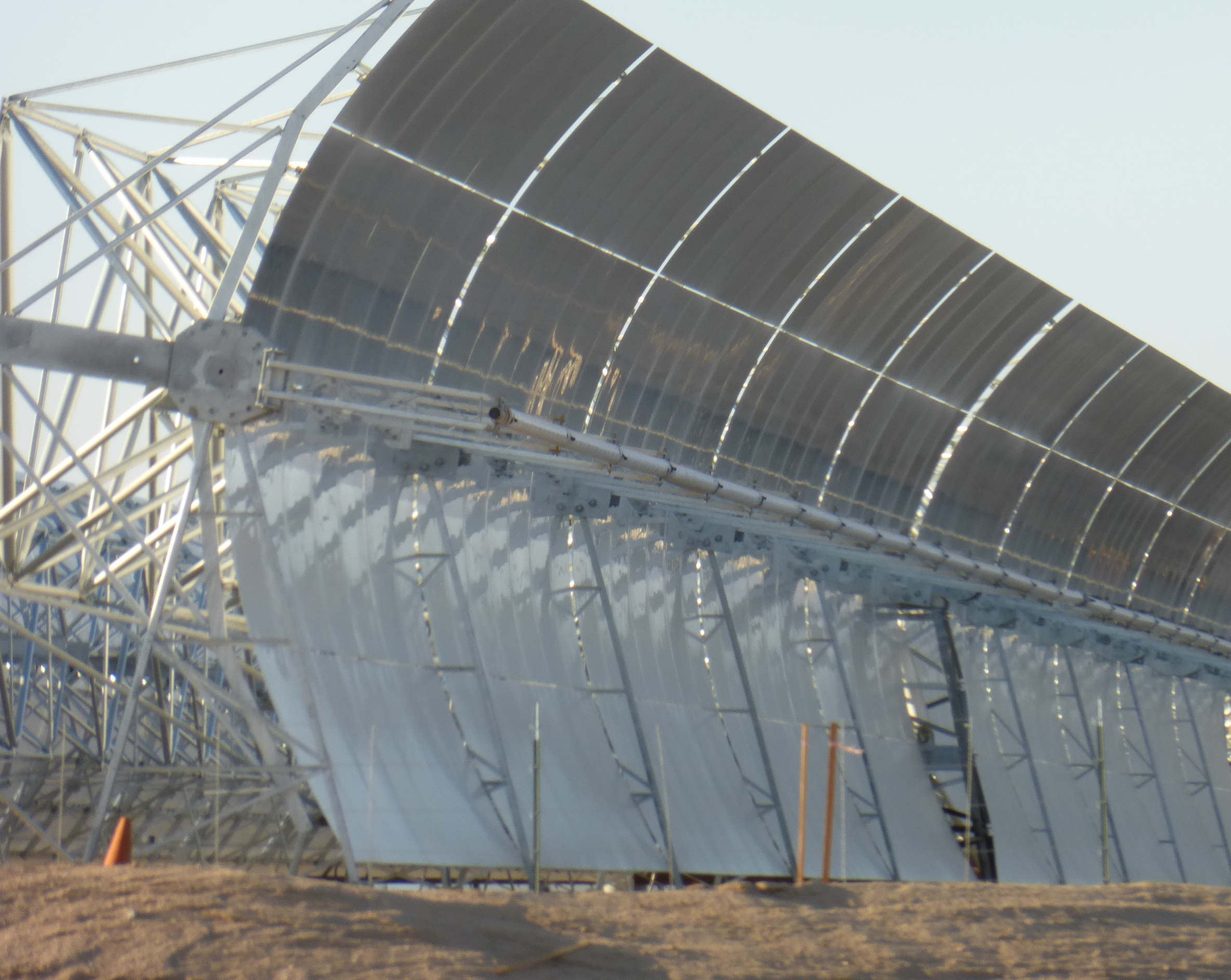
Parabolic trough at a plant near Harper Lake, California

A parabolic trough collector (PTC) is a type of solar thermal collector that is straight in one dimension and curved as a parabola in the other two, lined with a polished metal mirror. The sunlight which enters the mirror parallel to its plane of symmetry is focused along the focal line, where objects are positioned that are intended to be heated. In a solar cooker, for example, food is placed at the focal line of a trough, which is cooked when the trough is aimed so the Sun is in its plane of symmetry.

For other purposes, a tube containing a fluid runs the length of the trough at its focal line. The sunlight is concentrated on the tube and the fluid heated to a high temperature by the energy of the sunlight. The hot fluid can be piped to a heat engine (e.g. ORC or water/steam Rankine cycle), which uses the heat energy to drive machinery, or to generate electricity. This solar energy collector is the most common and best known type of parabolic trough.

When heat transfer fluid is used to heat steam to drive a standard turbine generator, thermal efficiency ranges from 50 to 80%. The overall efficiency from collector to grid, i.e. (electrical output power)/(total impinging solar power) is about 15%, similar to photovoltaic cells but less than Stirling dish concentrators. Large-scale solar thermal power plants need a method for storing the energy, such as a thermocline tank, which uses a mixture of silica sand and quartzite rock to displace a significant portion of the volume in the tank. It is then filled with the heat transfer fluid, typically a molten nitrate salt.

As of 2014, the largest solar thermal power systems using parabolic trough technology include the 354 MW SEGS plants in California, the 280 MW Solana Generating Station with molten salt heat storage, the 250 MW Genesis Solar Energy Project, the Spanish 200 MW Solaben Solar Power Station, and the Andasol 1 solar power station.

== Efficiency ==
A diagram of a parabolic trough solar farm (top), and an end view of how a parabolic collector focuses sunlight onto its focal point.

The trough is usually aligned on a north–south axis, and rotated to track the sun as it moves across the sky each day. Alternatively, the trough can be aligned on an east–west axis; this reduces the overall efficiency of the collector due to the sunlight striking the collectors at an angle but only requires the trough to be aligned with the change in seasons, avoiding the need for tracking motors. This tracking method approaches theoretical efficiencies at the spring and fall equinoxes with less accurate focusing of the light at other times during the year. The daily motion of the sun across the sky also introduces errors, greatest at the sunrise and sunset and smallest at noon. Due to these sources of error, seasonally adjusted parabolic troughs are generally designed with a lower concentration acceptance product.

Parabolic trough concentrators have a simple geometry, but their concentration is about 1/3 of the theoretical maximum for the same acceptance angle, that is, for the same overall tolerances of the system to all kinds of errors, including those referenced above. The theoretical maximum is better achieved with more elaborate concentrators based on primary-secondary designs using nonimaging optics which may nearly double the concentration of conventional parabolic troughs and are used to improve practical designs such as those with fixed receivers.

Heat transfer fluid (usually thermal oil) runs through the tube to absorb the concentrated sunlight. This increases the temperature of the fluid to some 400 °C. The heat transfer fluid is then used to heat steam in a standard turbine generator. The process is economical and, for heating the pipe, thermal efficiency ranges from 60 to 80%. The overall efficiency from collector to grid, i.e. (Electrical Output Power)/(Total Impinging Solar Power) is about 15%, similar to PV (Photovoltaic Cells) but less than Stirling dish concentrators.

== Design ==
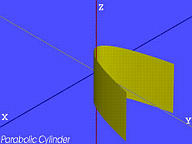
A parabolic trough is shaped as a parabola in the x-y plane, but is linear in the z direction

A parabolic trough is made of a number of solar collector modules (SCM) fixed together to move as one solar collector assembly (SCA). A SCM could have a length up to 15 metres (49 ft 3 in) or more. About a dozen or more of SCM make each SCA up to 200 metres (656 ft 2 in) length. Each SCA is an independently-tracking parabolic trough.

A SCM may be made as a single-piece parabolic mirror or assembled with a number of smaller mirrors in parallel rows. Smaller modular mirrors require smaller machines to build the mirror, reducing cost. Cost is also reduced in case of the need of replacing a damaged mirror. Such damage may occur due to being hit by an object during bad weather.

In addition, V-type troughs exist which are made from 2 mirrors and placed at an angle towards each other.

In 2009, scientists at the National Renewable Energy Laboratory (NREL) and SkyFuel teamed to develop large curved sheets of metal that have the potential to be 30% less expensive than today's best collectors of concentrated solar power by replacing glass-based models with a silver polymer sheet that has the same performance as the heavy glass mirrors, but at a much lower cost and weight. It also is much easier to move and install. The glossy film uses several layers of polymers, with an inner layer of pure silver.

As this renewable source of energy is inconsistent by nature, methods for energy storage have been studied, for instance, the single-tank (thermocline) storage technology for large-scale solar thermal power plants. The thermocline tank approach uses a mixture of silica sand and quartzite rock to displace a significant portion of the volume in the tank. Then it is filled with the heat transfer fluid, typically a molten nitrate salt.

== Enclosed trough ==
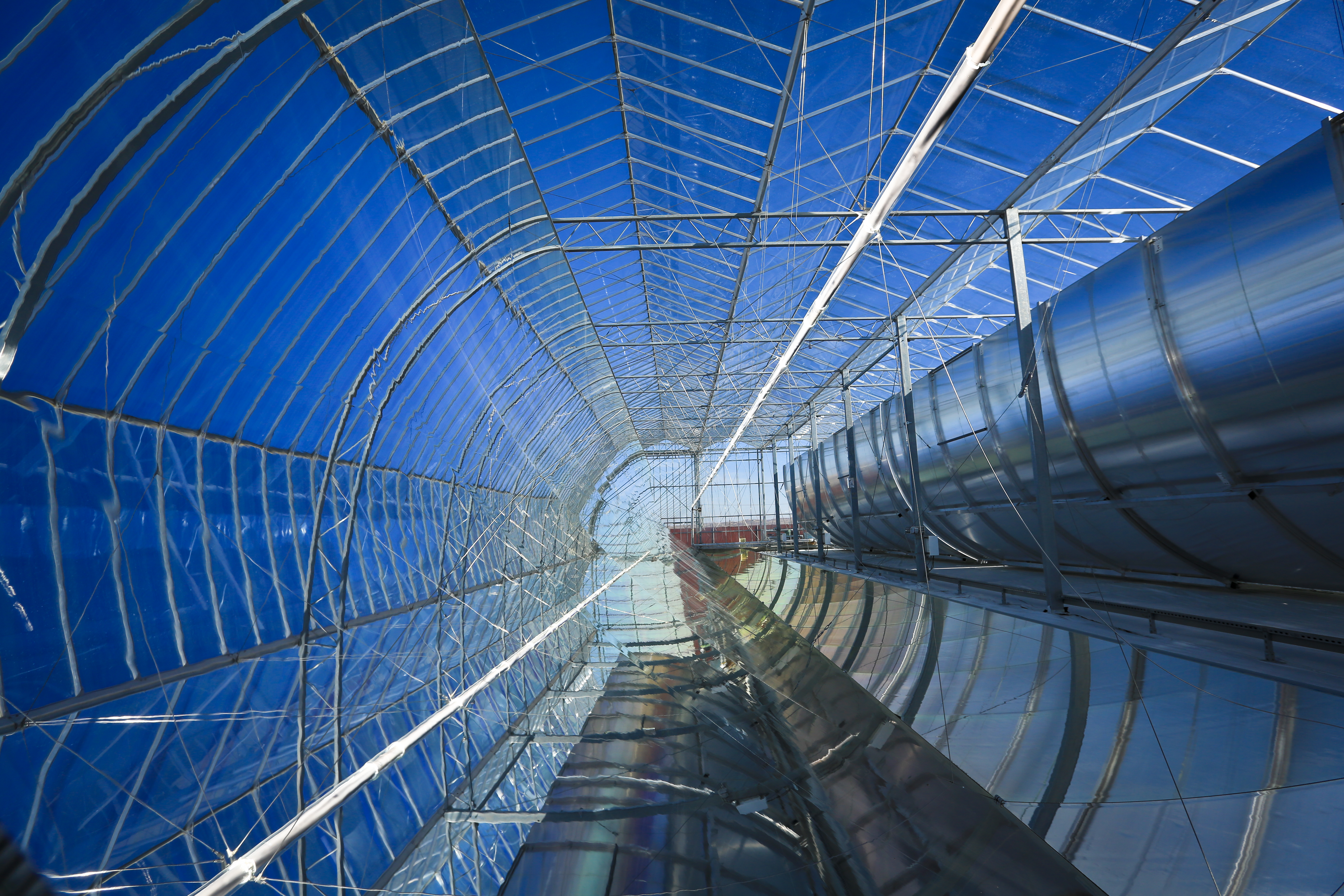
Inside an enclosed trough system

The enclosed trough architecture encapsulates the solar thermal system within a greenhouse-like glasshouse. The glasshouse creates a protected environment to withstand the elements that can increase the reliability and efficiency of the solar thermal system.

Lightweight curved solar-reflecting mirrors are suspended within the glasshouse. A single-axis tracking system positions the mirrors to track the sun and focus its light onto a network of stationary steel pipes, also suspended from the glasshouse structure. Steam is generated directly using oil field-quality water, as water flows along the length of the pipes, without heat exchangers or intermediate working fluids.

The steam produced is then fed directly to the field's existing steam distribution network, where the steam is continuously injected deep into the oil reservoir. Sheltering the mirrors from the wind allows them to achieve higher temperatures and prevents dust from building up as a result from exposure to humidity. GlassPoint Solar, the company that created the Enclosed Trough design, states its technology can produce heat for EOR for about $5 per million British thermal units in sunny regions, compared to between $10 and $12 for other conventional solar thermal technologies.

Enclosed troughs are currently being used at the Miraah solar facility in Oman. In November 2017, GlassPoint announced a partnership with Aera Energy that would bring parabolic troughs to the South Belridge Oil Field, near Bakersfield, California.

== Early commercial adoption ==
A 1917 patent drawing for Shuman's parabolic trough solar energy system

In 1897, Frank Shuman, a U.S. inventor, engineer and solar energy pioneer built a small demonstration solar engine that worked by reflecting solar energy onto square boxes filled with ether, which has a lower boiling point than water, and were fitted internally with black pipes which in turn powered a steam engine. In 1908 Shuman formed the Sun Power Company with the intent of building larger solar power plants. He, along with his technical advisor A. S. E. Ackermann and British physicist Sir Charles Vernon Boys, developed an improved system using mirrors to reflect solar energy upon collector boxes, increasing heating capacity to the extent that water could now be used instead of ether. Shuman then constructed a full-scale steam engine powered by low-pressure water, enabling him to patent the entire solar engine system by 1912.

Shuman built the world's first solar thermal power station in Maadi, Egypt between 1912 and 1913. Shuman's plant used parabolic troughs to power a 45–52 kilowatt (60–70 hp) engine that pumped more than 22,000 litres of water per minute from the Nile River to adjacent cotton fields. Although the outbreak of World War I and the discovery of cheap oil in the 1930s discouraged the advancement of solar energy, Shuman's vision and basic design were resurrected in the 1970s with a new wave of interest in solar thermal energy. In 1916 Shuman was quoted in the media advocating solar energy's utilization, saying:

We have proved the commercial profit of sun power in the tropics and have more particularly proved that after our stores of oil and coal are exhausted the human race can receive unlimited power from the rays of the sun.

— Frank Shuman, New York Times, July 2, 1916

== Commercial plants ==
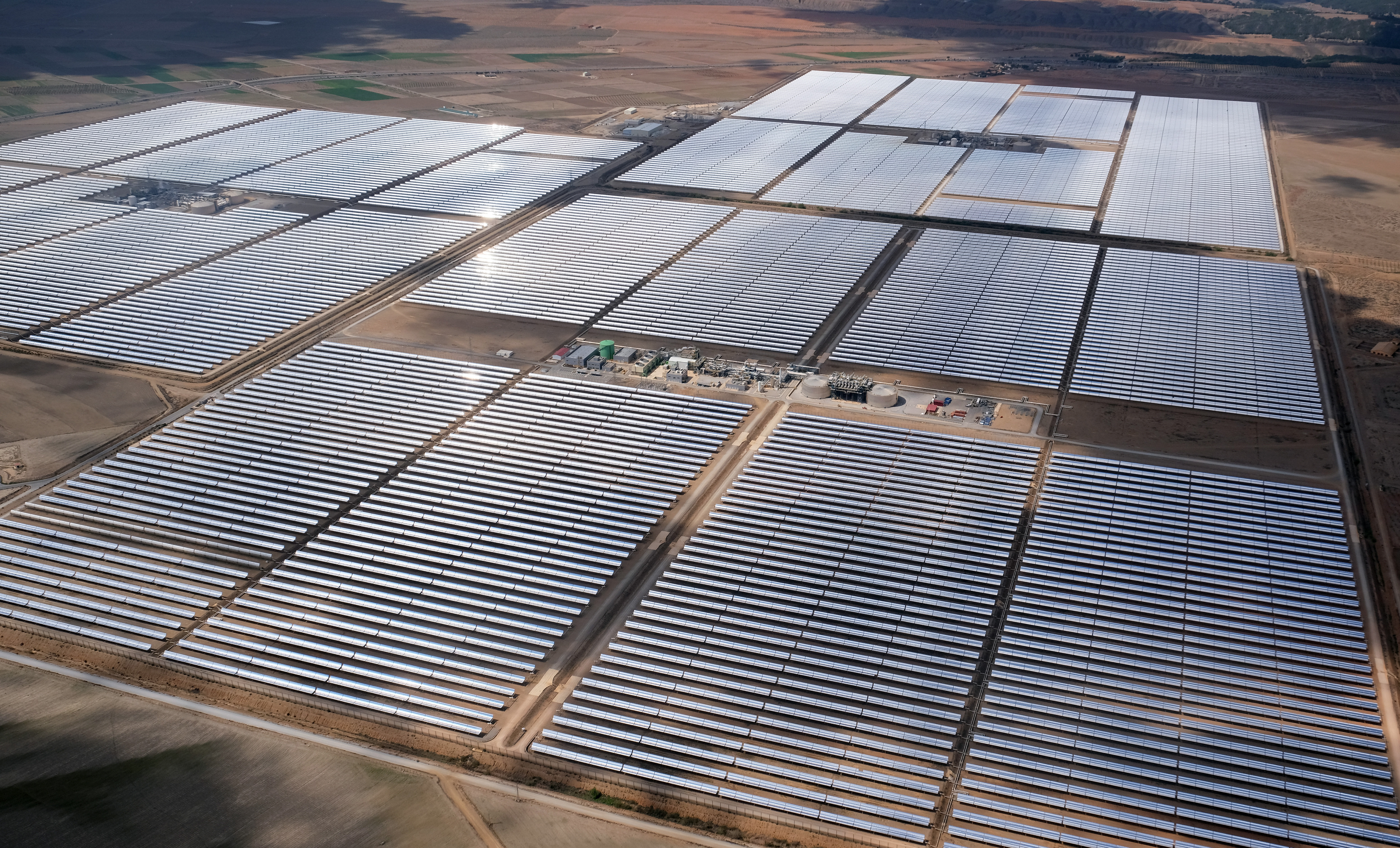
Andasol Solar Power Station in Spain.

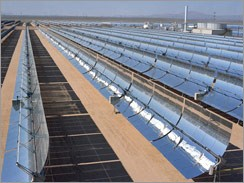
Array of parabolic troughs.

Commercial plants using parabolic troughs may use thermal storage at night while some are hybrids and support natural gas as a secondary fuel source. In the United States the amount of fossil fuel used in order for the plant to qualify as a renewable energy source is limited to a maximum 27% of electricity production. Because they include cooling stations, condensers, accumulators and other things besides the actual solar collectors, the power generated per square meter of area varies enormously.

As of 2014, the largest solar thermal power systems using parabolic trough technology include the 354 MW SEGS plants in California, the 280 MW Solana Generating Station with molten salt heat storage, the 250 MW Genesis Solar Energy Project, the Spanish 200 MW Solaben Solar Power Station, and the Andasol 1 solar power station.

== See also ==
- Parabola
- Parabolic reflector
- Solar cooker
- List of solar thermal power stations

== Bibliography ==
- Duffie, John; Williams Beckman (1991). Solar Engineering of Thermal Processes (Second ed.). New York: John Wiley & Sons, Inc. ISBN 0-471-51056-4.
- Patel., Mukund (1999). Wind and solar power systems. Boca Raton London New York Washington, D.C.: CRC Press. ISBN 0-8493-1605-7.
