= Biological wood oxidation =

Method for home space heating

Biological wood oxidation is a composting of wood substrate which aims at generating heat—for this reason, it is also known as "compost heating". During the wood oxidation process; microorganisms, mainly bacteria and fungi, degrade wood substrate into CO_{2}, H_{2}O, and subsequently release heat in the presence of oxygen. Mainly woody materials like branches, trunk, and leaves are used. These materials are rich in carbon and poor in nutrients like nitrogen. As a result, nutrient-rich additives such as manure, urine and food waste are used to enhance and accelerate the process. The temperature of wood composting usually varies from 20 to 70 °C, which fits well for building applications such as air heating, floor heating and domestic hot water service.

== Biomeiler ==
One of the most common application of biological wood oxidation is in a compost heater or "Biomeiler". Biomeiler has been paid a lot of attention and the number of biomeiler has increased dramatically in the world. Biomeiler was firstly developed by a French inventor, Jean Pain, in 1970s. Now, it has been developed in Germany., Romania, Netherlands, Australia and some other countries like Italy, France, US, Belgium, Czech Republic.

A biomeiler is a system consisting of tons of shredded woodchips. It is usually a round construction with several meter width and several meter height. In the biomeiler construction, coils of hosing or piping are configured in the woodchips heap. These coils are completely filled with water, which runs through a heat-exchanger mechanism, like a radiator. The cool water is pumped in the pipes and heated by the biomeiler pile.

This system has been proposed to utilise agricultural waste, specifically shredded waste banana plants, to generate hot water but has not been implemented.

== Turbomeiler ==
Another application of biological wood oxidation is turbomeiler. The turbomeilers were tested in Leeuwarden and Haarlem, the Netherlands. A turbomeiler is a large-high silo filled with woodchips. Compared with biomeiler, turbomeiler is a little bit more high-tech. The advantage of turbomeiler over biomeiler is that the woodchips can be filled and emptied continuously.

In the turbomeiler system, tons of woodchips are filled in a silo. Water is sprayed to the woodchips pile from the top, and the water percolates through the pile of woodchips via gravity. During percolation process, the percolated water is heated by the composting pile via conduction. The temperature of the water depends on the temperature of turbomeiler and the retention time. The percolated water is usually collected on the bottom of turbomeiler and flowed to a buffer tank for heat recovery. After heat recovery (usually by a heat exchanger), the water is then pumped from the buffer tank to the top of turbomeiler and sprayed again for next circulation. By doing the water spray, the wood chips are humidified and the heat is extracted.

== Advantages of biological wood oxidation ==
The main advantages of biological wood oxidation are that it generates hot water with low cost and it can save money for heating water. It is estimated that the material cost (except for wood waste) of a 90 m^{3} woodchips pile is only 457 euro and the cost of tool / machine is 525 euro. Arie van Ziel and Paolo Zampieri reported that the total cost of building a biomeiler pile is 3000 euro and with reuse it can be possible to have a cost of 700 euro for next biomeiler process. Jorritsma also reported that the total cost (including woodchips, materials and labor) of a 135 m^{3} biomeiler pile is 6225 euro and it can save 6900 euro compared to using gas. Turbomeiler is more expensive due to the high cost of silo. However, it costs much less once the turbomeiler has been built. Even if the biological wood oxidation cannot heat the water to a high temperature when the heat generation rate decreases, it can save energy and money by preheating the water for further use.

Another advantage of biological wood oxidation is that the final product is wood compost, which is the final product of wood composting. The wood compost creates a new possibility generating soil conditioner. It was reported that biological wood oxidation could retain about 70% of the CO_{2} absorbed by wood (through photosynthesis process) in the form of compost.

The next advantage of biological wood oxidation is that it is an environment-friendly technology and can reduce the environmental pressure caused by combustion of fossil fuels. Combustion of fossil fuels cause global warming (due to the emission of CO_{2}) and air pollution (due to the emission of SO_{2} and NO_{x}). With the rapid increase of worldwide energy demand, the generated heat from biological wood oxidation gains more and more interests, as it can be seen as a sustainable alternative to fossil fuels and one of the primary possibilities for preventing global warming

== Disadvantage of biological wood oxidation ==
The main disadvantage of biological wood oxidation is that the heat production rate is low and it is not possible to drain enough hot water for a longer period of time. It is reported that the heat production rate from biological wood oxidation usually varies from 0.02 to 0.95 W/kg DM, depending on the different conditions, which is much lower (200–6000 times lower) compared to a domestic stove for wood burning. In order to get a reasonable hot water service, the pile mass of biological wood oxidation is usually large. For example, the mass of biomeiler varies from 10 tons to 50 tons. So far, there is little information about the weight loss of woodchips in biomeiler and turbomeiler due to the poor homogenization of the woodchips pile. Several reasons might result in the low heat production rate of biomeiler: improper temperature, low humidity and low oxygen availability.

The first reason is the low oxygen availability. Biomeiler is a big pile of woodchips and its core part has low rate of air exchange. The air flow in the core part of biomeiler largely depends on the pore size and particle size of woodchips. Biological wood oxidation is an aerobic process, which is strongly inhibited by the low oxygen availability. It was reported that the best availability of oxygen is a free pore volume of around 30% and an air volume of approximately 50%. However, in the core part of biomeiler, the oxygen availability is usually low. Jean Pain found that methane was even generated in the biomeiler pile.

Another reason could be the improper temperature, which means that the temperature in the center part is too high and in the outside part is too low. The temperature of a biomeiler can reach 70 °C in the center part, which is not good for fast biological wood oxidation because the proper temperature for the growth of wood decaying fungi and bacteria in composting varies from 40 to 55 °C. The temperature in the outside part of biomeiler may be low because the generated heat is likely lost to the ambient air. In winter the biomeiler might even stop. The last reason is the low humidity. Tons of water is initially added to the biomeiler pile in order to wet the woodchips. However, the generated heat is drying the pile of woodchips. The higher heat production, the drier woodchips.

Humidity is an important factor affecting microbial activity. Research shows that humidity below 40% decreases the microbial activity and if the humidity exceeds 60%, the air flow through biomeiler can be obstructed, making the presence of oxygen the limiting factor. It was reported that the dry part of biomeiler is only less than 20% and this number is 60% in the center part of biomeiler. Therefore, the heat production rate of biomeiler is low.

The humidity, aeration and temperature can be controlled in turbomeiler system. However, it was reported that the maximum temperature of turbomeiler is only 37 °C due to the poor insulation condition. It is clear that turbomeiler can not be a heat source for domestic use. Since little information about turbomeiler is known, the heat production of turbomeiler remains unclear.

== See also ==
- Solar thermal energy
