= TAPPS2 =

Solar thermal energy

TAPPS2 (Technische Alternative Planungs- und Programmier-System) is a tool used for developing the program logic for the universal, heating and solar thermal controllers by Austrian manufacturer Technische Alternative. Its primary usecase is defining the exact reaction of the controller to a certain event. Other than its predecessor, TAPPS, which could only be used to program controllers of type UVR1611, TAPPS2 is mainly used to program the UVR16x2 and RSM610 controllers, as well as several extension modules.

== Development ==
Development in TAPPS2 is done on a vector-based drawing surface using components that can be placed via drag and drop. The components, which can be separated into inputs, functions and outputs are then being connected according to their individual features. Available components vary according to the current solar thermal control unit.
