= Solar thermal energy =

Technology using sunlight for heat

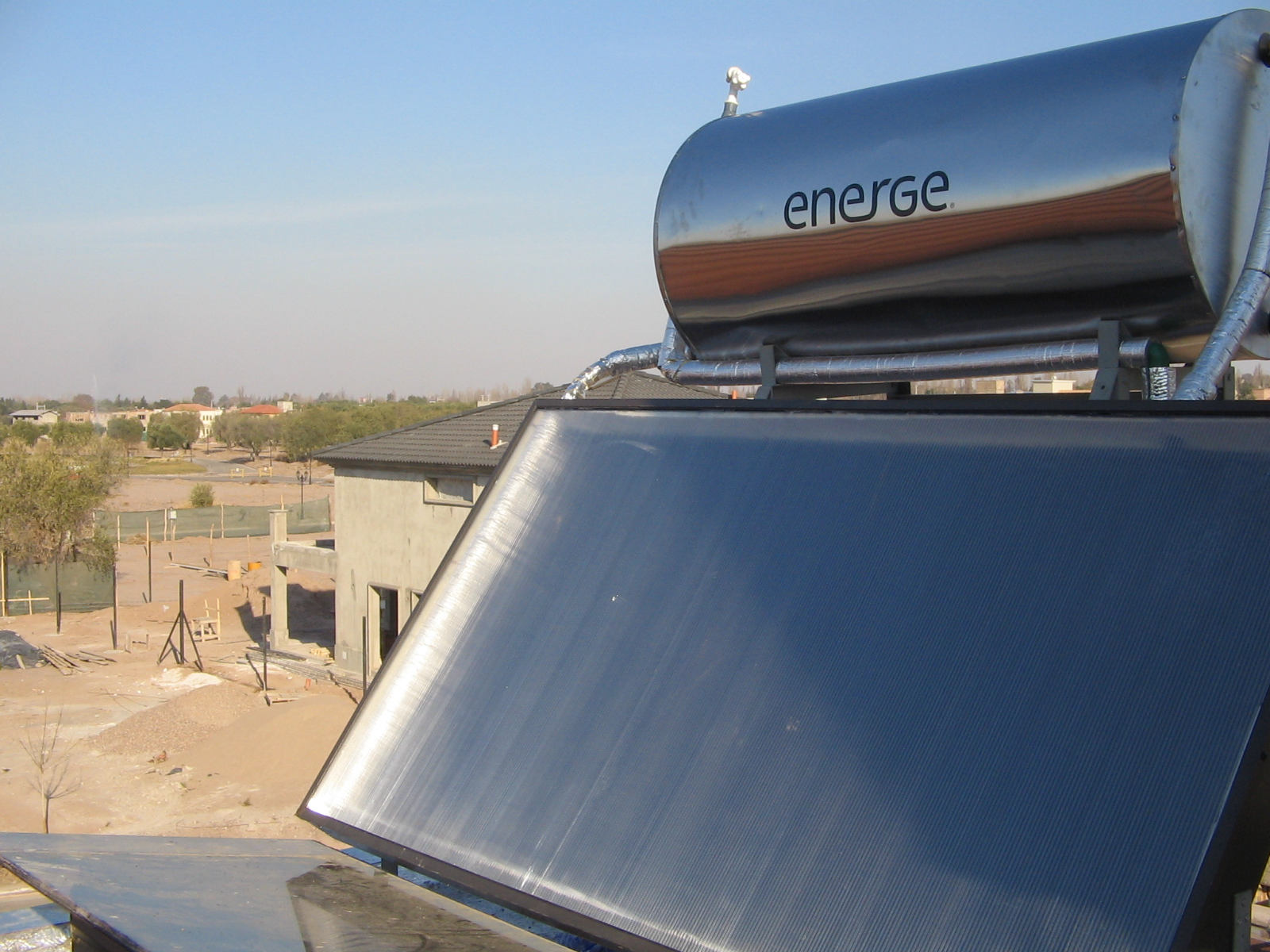
Roof-mounted close-coupled thermosiphon solar water heater

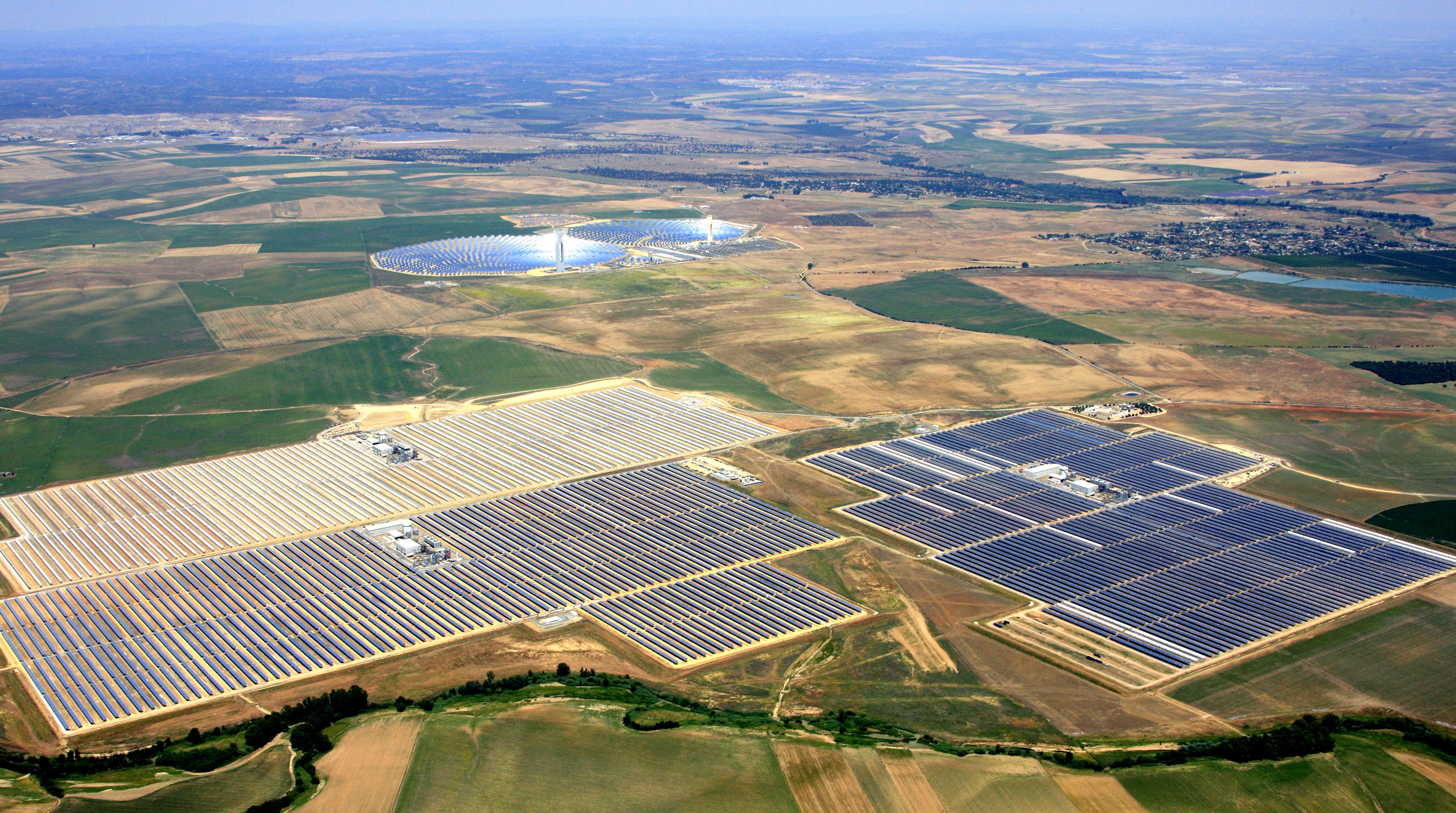
The first three units of Solnova in the foreground, with the two towers of the PS10 and PS20 solar power stations in the background

Solar thermal energy (STE) is a form of energy and a technology for harnessing solar energy to generate thermal energy for use in industry, and in the residential and commercial sectors. Solar thermal collectors are classified by the United States Energy Information Administration as low-, medium-, or high-temperature collectors. Low-temperature collectors are generally unglazed and used to heat swimming pools or to heat ventilation air. Medium-temperature collectors are also usually flat plates but are used for heating water or air for residential and commercial use.

High-temperature collectors concentrate sunlight using mirrors or lenses and are generally used for fulfilling heat requirements up to 300 °C (600 °F) / 20 bar (300 psi) pressure in industries, and for electric power production. Categories include concentrated solar thermal (CST) for fulfilling heat requirements in industries, and concentrated solar power (CSP) when the heat collected is used for electric power generation. CST and CSP are not replaceable in terms of application.

Unlike photovoltaic cells that convert sunlight directly into electricity, solar thermal systems convert it into heat. They use mirrors or lenses to concentrate sunlight onto a receiver, which in turn heats a water reservoir. The heated water can then be used in homes. The advantage of solar thermal is that the heated water can be stored until it is needed, eliminating the need for a separate energy storage system. Solar thermal power can also be converted to electricity by using the steam generated from the heated water to drive a turbine connected to a generator. However, because generating electricity this way is much more expensive than photovoltaic power plants, there are very few in use today.

== History ==
Augustin Mouchot demonstrated a solar collector with a cooling engine making ice cream at the 1878 Universal Exhibition in Paris. The first installation of solar thermal energy equipment occurred in the Sahara approximately in 1910 by Frank Shuman when a steam engine was run on steam produced by sunlight. Because liquid fuel engines were developed and found more convenient, the Sahara project was abandoned, only to be revisited several decades later. As of 2023, the world's largest thermal solar power plant is in the United Arab Emirates.

== Low-temperature heating and cooling ==
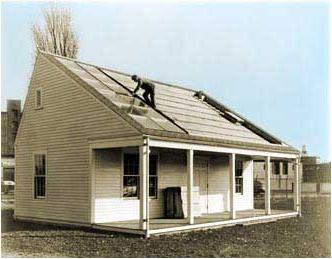
MIT's Solar House#1 built in 1939 used seasonal thermal energy storage (STES) for year-round heating.

Systems for utilizing low-temperature solar thermal energy include means for heat collection; usually heat storage, either short-term or interseasonal; and distribution within a structure or a district heating network. In some cases a single feature can do more than one of these things (e.g. some kinds of solar collectors also store heat). Some systems are passive, others are active (requiring other external energy to function).

Heating is the most obvious application, but solar cooling can be achieved for a building or for district cooling by using a heat-driven absorption or adsorption chiller (heat pump). There is a productive coincidence that the greater the driving heat from insolation, the greater the cooling output. In 1878, Auguste Mouchout pioneered solar cooling by making ice using a solar steam engine attached to a refrigeration device.

In the United States, heating, ventilation, and air conditioning (HVAC) systems account for over 25% (4.75 EJ) of the energy used in commercial buildings (50% in northern cities) and nearly half (10.1 EJ) of the energy used in residential buildings. Solar heating, cooling, and ventilation technologies can be used to offset a portion of this energy. The most popular solar heating technology for heating buildings is the building integrated transpired solar air collection system which connects to the building's HVAC equipment. According to Solar Energy Industries Association over 500,000 m^{2} (5,000,000 square feet) of these panels are in operation in North America as of 2015.

In Europe, since the mid-1990s about 125 large solar-thermal district heating plants have been constructed, each with over 500 m^{2} (5400 ft^{2}) of solar collectors. The largest are about 10,000 m^{2} (2.5 acres), with capacities of 7 MW-thermal and solar heat costs around 4 Eurocents/kWh without subsidies. 40 of them have nominal capacities of 1 MW-thermal or more. The Solar District Heating program (SDH) has participation from 14 European Nations and the European Commission, and is working toward technical and market development, and holds annual conferences.

=== Low-temperature collectors ===
Glazed solar collectors are designed primarily for space heating. They recirculate building air through a solar air panel where the air is heated and then directed back into the building. These solar space heating systems require at least two penetrations into the building and only perform when the air in the solar collector is warmer than the building room temperature. Most glazed collectors are used in the residential sector.

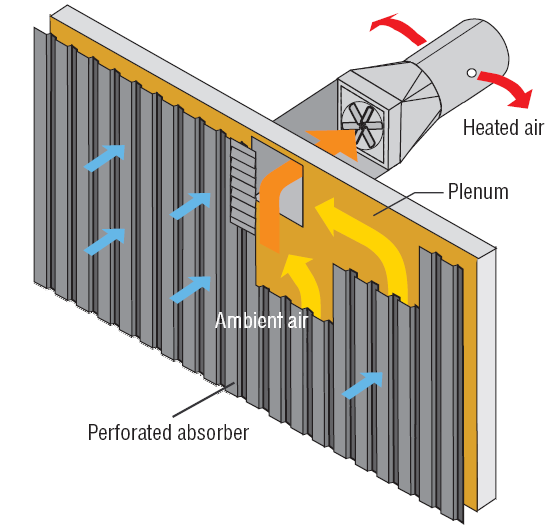
Unglazed, "transpired" air collector

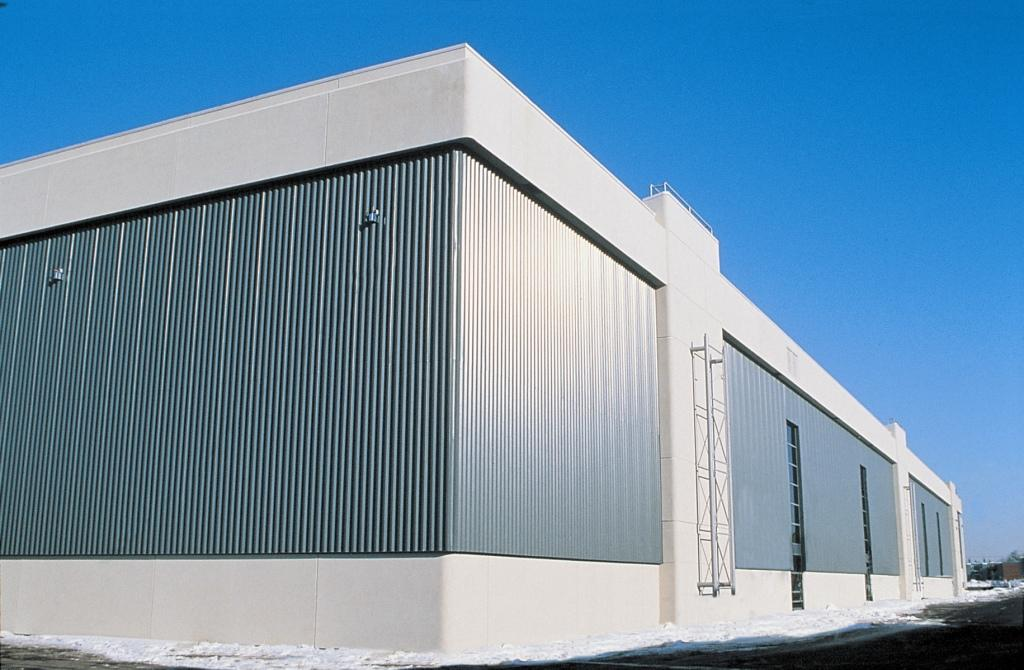
Building integrated unglazed transpired solar air collector with grey walls and white canopy/collection ducts

Unglazed solar collectors are primarily used to pre-heat make-up ventilation air in commercial, industrial and institutional buildings with a high ventilation load. They turn building walls or sections of walls into low cost, high performance, unglazed solar collectors. Also called, "transpired solar panels" or "solar wall", they employ a painted perforated metal solar heat absorber that also serves as the exterior wall surface of the building. Heat transfer to the air takes place on the surface of the absorber, through the metal absorber and behind the absorber. The boundary layer of solar heated air is drawn into a nearby perforation before the heat can escape by convection to the outside air. The heated air is then drawn from behind the absorber plate into the building's ventilation system.

A Trombe wall is a passive solar heating and ventilation system consisting of an air channel sandwiched between a window and a sun-facing thermal mass. During the ventilation cycle, sunlight stores heat in the thermal mass and warms the air channel, causing circulation through vents at the top and bottom of the wall. During the heating cycle the Trombe wall radiates stored heat.

Solar roof ponds for solar heating and cooling were developed by Harold Hay in the 1960s. A basic system consists of a roof-mounted water bladder with a movable insulating cover. This system can control heat exchange between interior and exterior environments by covering and uncovering the bladder between night and day. When heating is a concern the bladder is uncovered during the day allowing sunlight to warm the water bladder and store heat for evening use. When cooling is a concern the covered bladder draws heat from the building's interior during the day and is uncovered at night to radiate heat to the cooler atmosphere. The Skytherm house in Atascadero, California uses a prototype roof pond for heating and cooling.

Solar space heating with solar air heat collectors is more popular in the US and Canada than heating with solar liquid collectors since most buildings already have a ventilation system for heating and cooling. The two main types of solar air panels are glazed and unglazed.

Of the 21,000,000 square feet (2,000,000 m^{2}) of solar thermal collectors produced in the United States in 2007, 16,000,000 square feet (1,500,000 m^{2}) were of the low-temperature variety. Low-temperature collectors are generally installed to heat swimming pools, although they can also be used for space heating. Collectors can use air or water as the medium to transfer the heat to their destination. The sun's free energy can also be used to heat water to fulfil domestic hot water demands, such as the hot water that comes out of taps. Solar thermal water heating systems can provide approximately 50% of a property's annual hot water demand (depending on the size of the property, its location, etc.) which in turn can help homeowners make savings on their energy bills.

== Heat storage for space heating ==
A collection of mature technologies called seasonal thermal energy storage (STES) is capable of storing heat for months at a time, so solar heat collected primarily in Summer can be used for all-year heating. Solar-supplied STES technology has been advanced primarily in Denmark, Germany, and Canada, and applications include individual buildings and district heating networks. Drake Landing Solar Community in Alberta, Canada has a small district system and in 2012 achieved a world record of providing 97% of the community's all-year space heating needs from the sun. STES thermal storage mediums include deep aquifers; native rock surrounding clusters of small-diameter, heat exchanger equipped boreholes; large, shallow, lined pits that are filled with gravel and top-insulated; and large, insulated and buried surface water tanks.

Centralized district heating round the clock is also feasible with concentrated solar thermal (CST) storage plant.

Interseasonal storage. Solar heat (or heat from other sources) can be effectively stored between opposing seasons in aquifers, underground geological strata, large specially constructed pits, and large tanks that are insulated and covered with earth.

Short-term storage. Thermal mass materials store solar energy during the day and release this energy during cooler periods. Common thermal mass materials include stone, concrete, and water. The proportion and placement of thermal mass should consider several factors such as climate, daylighting, and shading conditions. When properly incorporated, thermal mass can passively maintain comfortable temperatures while reducing energy consumption.

=== Solar-driven cooling ===
Worldwide, by 2011 there were about 750 cooling systems with solar-driven heat pumps, and annual market growth was 40 to 70% over the prior seven years. It is a niche market because the economics are challenging, with the annual number of cooling hours a limiting factor. Respectively, the annual cooling time is roughly 1000 hours in the Mediterranean, 2500 hours in Southeast Asia, and only 50 to 200 hours in Central Europe. However, system construction costs dropped about 50% between 2007 and 2011. The International Energy Agency (IEA) Solar Heating and Cooling program (IEA-SHC) task groups working on further development of the technologies involved.

=== Solar-heat-driven ventilation ===
A solar chimney (or thermal chimney) is a passive solar ventilation system composed of a hollow thermal mass connecting the interior and exterior of a building. As the chimney warms, the air inside is heated causing an updraft that pulls air through the building. These systems have been in use since Roman times and remain common in the Middle East.

=== Process heat ===
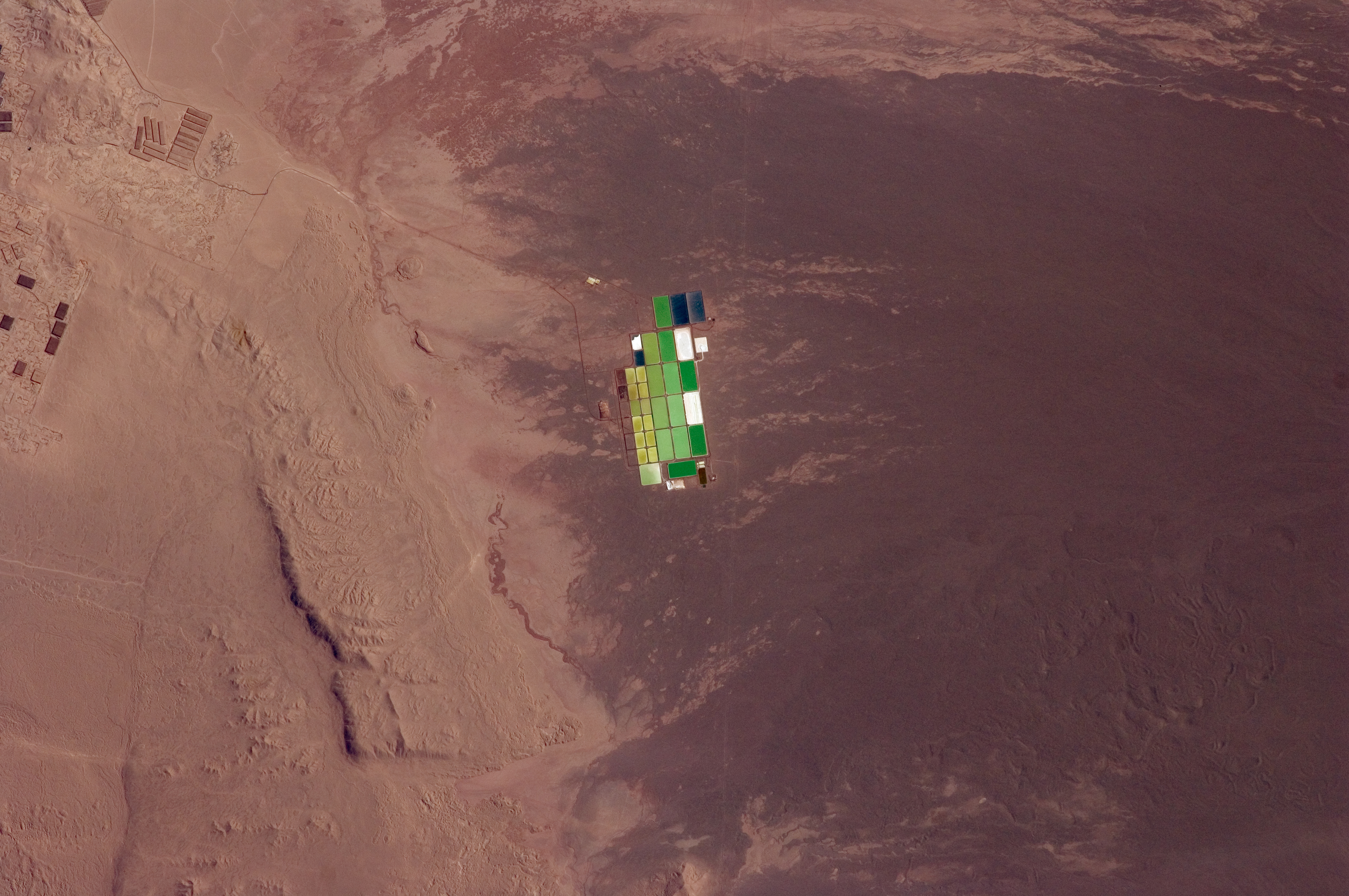
Solar evaporation ponds in the Atacama Desert

Solar process heating systems are designed to provide large quantities of hot water or space heating for nonresidential buildings.

Evaporation ponds are shallow ponds that concentrate dissolved solids through evaporation. The use of evaporation ponds to obtain salt from sea water is one of the oldest applications of solar energy. Modern uses include concentrating brine solutions used in leach mining and removing dissolved solids from waste streams. Altogether, evaporation ponds represent one of the largest commercial applications of solar energy in use today.

Unglazed transpired collectors are perforated sun-facing walls used for preheating ventilation air. Transpired collectors can also be roof mounted for year-round use and can raise the incoming air temperature up to 22 °C (72 °F) and deliver outlet temperatures of 45–60 °C (110–140 °F). The short payback period of transpired collectors (3 to 12 years) make them a more cost-effective alternative to glazed collection systems. As of 2015, over 4000 systems with a combined collector area of 500,000 m^{2} (100 acres) had been installed worldwide. Representatives include an 860 m^{2} (9,300 ft^{2}) collector in Costa Rica used for drying coffee beans and a 1300 m^{2} (14,000 ft^{2}) collector in Coimbatore, India used for drying marigolds.

A food processing facility in Modesto, California uses parabolic troughs to produce steam used in the manufacturing process. The 5,000 m^{2} collector area is expected to provide 15 TJ per year.

== Medium-temperature collectors ==
These collectors could be used to produce approximately 50% and more of the hot water needed for residential and commercial use in the United States. In the United States, a typical system costs $4000–$6000 retail ($1400 to $2200 wholesale for the materials) and 30% of the system qualifies for a federal tax credit + additional state credit exists in about half of the states. Labor for a simple open loop system in southern climates can take 3–5 hours for the installation and 4–6 hours in Northern areas. Northern system require more collector area and more complex plumbing to protect the collector from freezing. With this incentive, the payback time for a typical household is four to nine years, depending on the state. Similar subsidies exist in parts of Europe. A crew of one solar plumber and two assistants with minimal training can install a system per day. Thermosiphon installation have negligible maintenance costs (costs rise if antifreeze and mains power are used for circulation) and in the US reduces a household's operating costs by $6 per person per month. Solar water heating can reduce CO_{2} emissions of a family of four by 1 ton/year (if replacing natural gas) or 3 ton/year (if replacing electricity). Medium-temperature installations can use any of several designs: common designs are pressurized glycol, drain back, batch systems and newer low pressure freeze tolerant systems using polymer pipes containing water with photovoltaic pumping. European and International standards are being reviewed to accommodate innovations in design and operation of medium temperature collectors. Operational innovations include "permanently wetted collector" operation. This innovation reduces or even eliminates the occurrence of no-flow high temperature stresses called stagnation which would otherwise reduce the life expectancy of collectors.

=== Solar drying ===
Solar thermal energy can be useful for drying wood for construction and wood fuels such as wood chips for combustion. Solar is also used for food products such as fruits, grains, and fish. Crop drying by solar means is environmentally friendly as well as cost effective while improving the quality. The less money it takes to make a product, the less it can be sold for, pleasing both the buyers and the sellers. Technologies in solar drying include ultra low cost pumped transpired plate air collectors based on black fabrics. Solar thermal energy is helpful in the process of drying products such as wood chips and other forms of biomass by raising the temperature while allowing air to pass through and get rid of the moisture.

=== Cooking ===
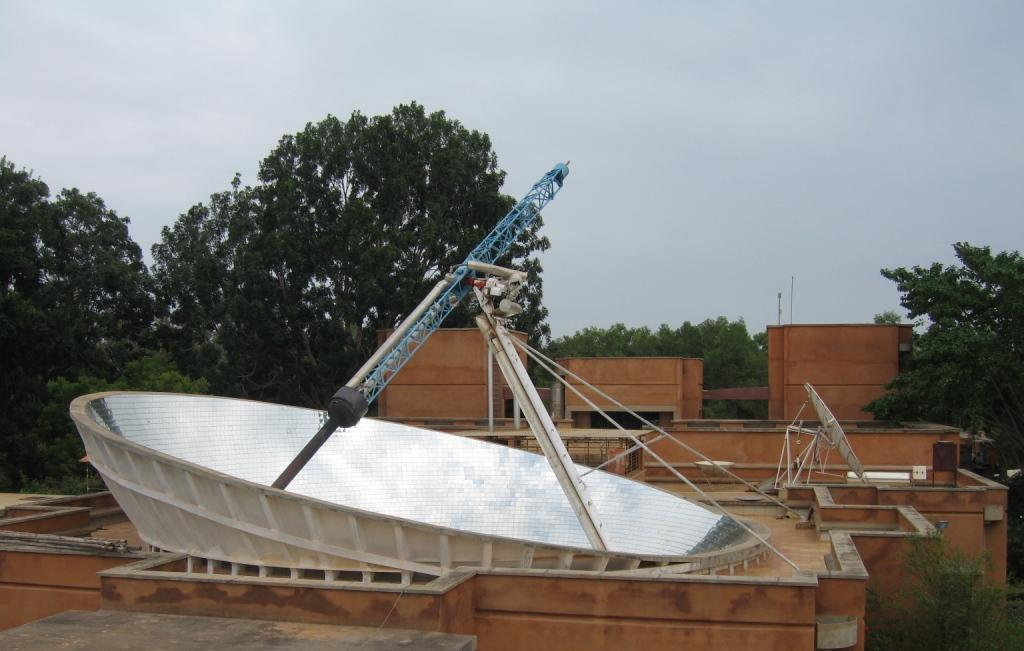
The Solar Bowl above the Solar Kitchen in Auroville, India concentrates sunlight on a movable receiver to produce steam for cooking.

Solar cookers use sunlight for cooking, drying and pasteurization. Solar cooking offsets fuel costs, reduces demand for fuel or firewood, and improves air quality by reducing or removing a source of smoke.

The simplest type of solar cooker is the box cooker first built by Horace de Saussure in 1767. A basic box cooker consists of an insulated container with a transparent lid. These cookers can be used effectively with partially overcast skies and will typically reach temperatures of 50–100 °C (100–200 °F).

Concentrating solar cookers use reflectors to concentrate solar energy onto a cooking container. The most common reflector geometries are flat plate, disc and parabolic trough type. These designs cook faster and at higher temperatures (up to 350 °C; 660 °F) but require direct light to function properly.

The Solar Kitchen in Auroville, India uses a unique concentrating technology known as the solar bowl. Contrary to conventional tracking reflector/fixed receiver systems, the solar bowl uses a fixed spherical reflector with a receiver which tracks the focus of light as the Sun moves across the sky. The solar bowl's receiver reaches temperature of 150 °C (300 °F) that is used to produce steam that helps cook 2,000 daily meals.

Many other solar kitchens in India use another unique concentrating technology known as the Scheffler reflector. This technology was first developed by Wolfgang Scheffler in 1986. A Scheffler reflector is a parabolic dish that uses single axis tracking to follow the Sun's daily course. These reflectors have a flexible reflective surface that is able to change its curvature to adjust to seasonal variations in the incident angle of sunlight. Scheffler reflectors have the advantage of having a fixed focal point which improves the ease of cooking and are able to reach temperatures of 450-650 °C (850 °F to 1200 °F). Built in 1999 by the Brahma Kumaris, the world's largest Scheffler reflector system in Abu Road, Rajasthan India is capable of cooking up to 35,000 meals a day. By early 2008, over 2000 large cookers of the Scheffler design had been built worldwide.

=== Distillation ===
Solar stills can be used to make drinking water in areas where clean water is not common. Solar distillation is necessary in these situations to provide people with purified water. Solar energy heats up the water in the still. The water then evaporates and condenses on the bottom of the covering glass.

=== Surgical autoclave steriliser ===
Dr Lin Zhao of MIT published a peer-reviewed academic journal in Joule detailing their design for a solar autoclave for the sterilisation of surgical instruments without electricity.

A prototype, which incorporates inexpensive aerogel was successfully demonstrated at a hospital in Mumbai in conjunction with IIT Bombay, Indian Institute of Technology.

== High-temperature collectors ==
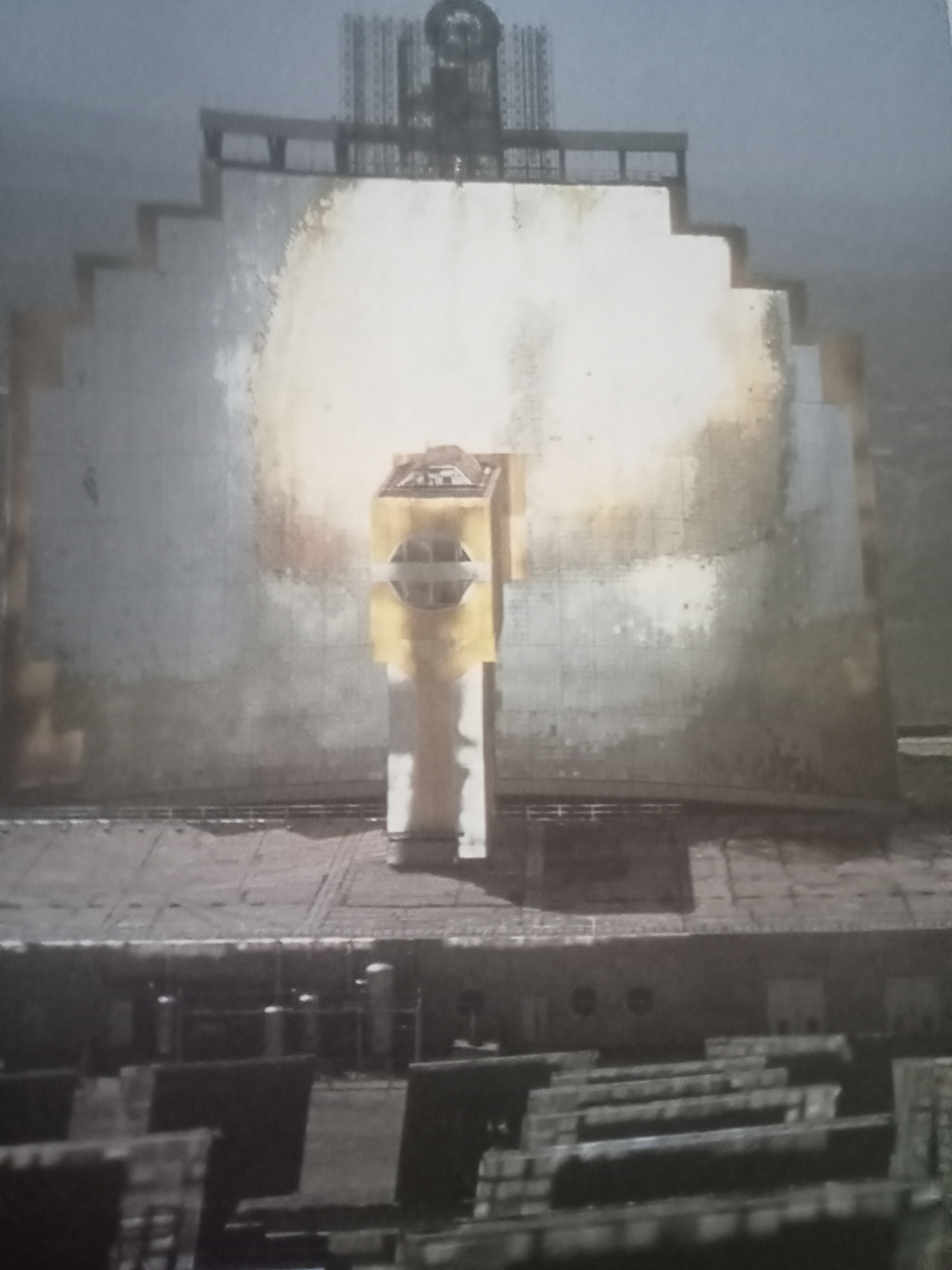
Giant mirrors of the Solar furnace of Uzbekistan in Tashkent. Especially after the nuclear accident in Chernobyl, safety and environmental factors have become decisive in the selection of energy sources.

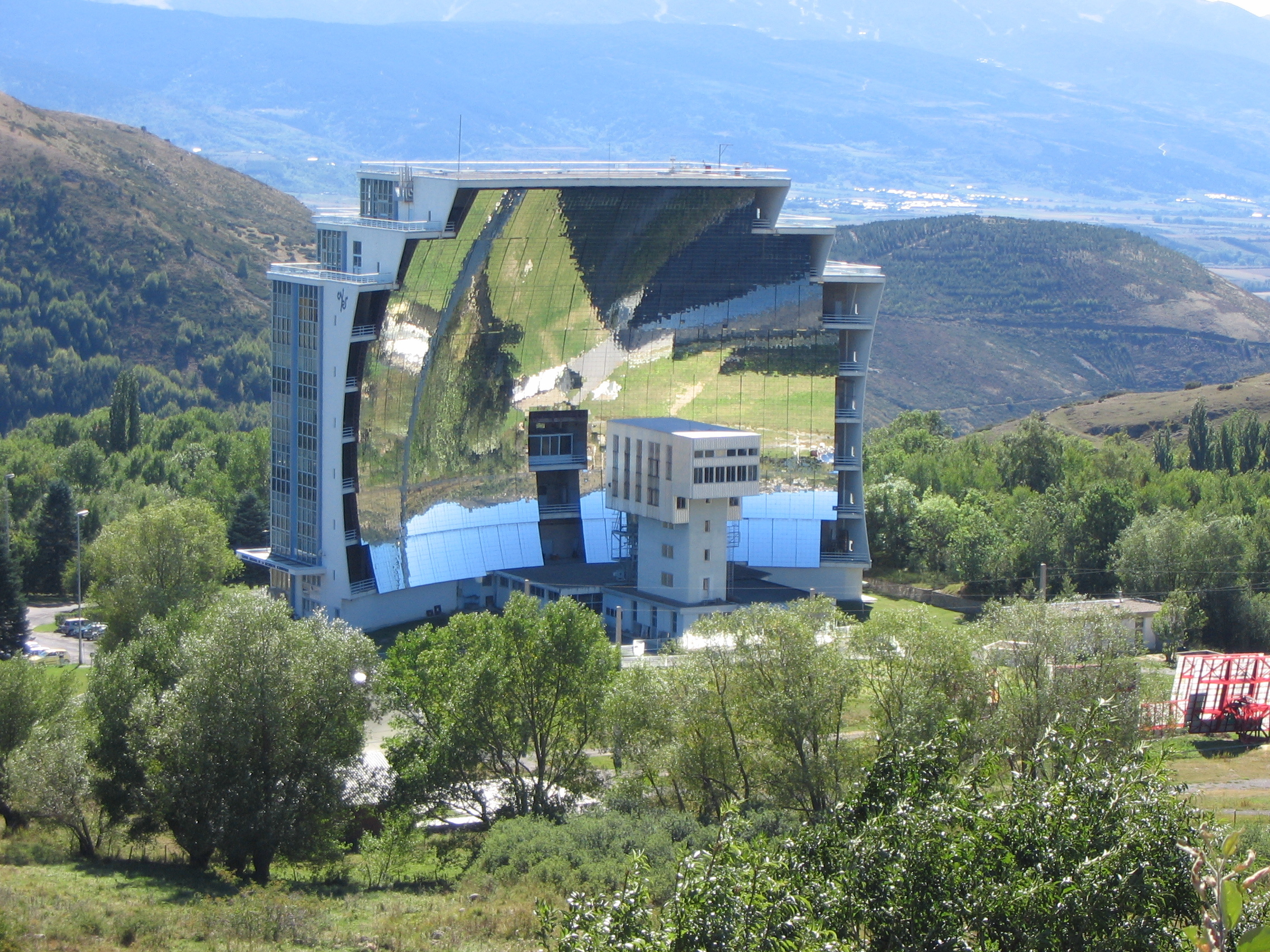
The solar furnace at Odeillo in the French Pyrenees-Orientales can reach temperatures up to 3,500° C (6300 °F).

Where temperatures below about 95 °C (200 °F) are sufficient, as for space heating, flat-plate collectors of the nonconcentrating type are generally used. Because of the relatively high heat losses through the glazing, flat plate collectors will not reach temperatures much above 200 °C (400 °F) even when the heat transfer fluid is stagnant. Such temperatures are too low for efficient conversion to electricity.

The efficiency of heat engines increases with the temperature of the heat source. To achieve this in solar thermal energy plants, solar radiation is concentrated by mirrors or lenses to obtain higher temperatures – a technique called concentrated solar power (CSP). The practical effect of high efficiencies is to reduce the plant's collector size and total land use per unit power generated, reducing the environmental impacts of a power plant as well as its expense.

As the temperature increases, different forms of conversion become practical. Up to 600 °C (1100 °F), steam turbines, standard technology, have an efficiency up to 41%. Above 600 °C (1100 °F), gas turbines can be more efficient. Higher temperatures are problematic because different materials and techniques are needed. One proposal for very high temperatures is to use liquid fluoride salts operating between 700 °C (1300 °F) to 800 °C (1500 °F), using multi-stage turbine systems to achieve 50% or more thermal efficiencies. The higher operating temperatures permit the plant to use higher-temperature dry heat exchangers for its thermal exhaust, reducing the plant's water use – critical in the deserts where large solar plants are practical. High temperatures also make heat storage more efficient, because more watt-hours are stored per unit of fluid.

Commercial concentrating solar thermal power (CSP) plants were first developed in the 1980s. The world's largest solar thermal power plants are now the 370 MW Ivanpah Solar Power Facility, commissioned in 2014, and the 354 MW SEGS CSP installation, both located in the Mojave Desert of California, where several other solar projects have been realized as well.

The principal advantage of CSP is the ability to efficiently add thermal storage, allowing the dispatching of electricity over up to a 24-hour period. Since peak electricity demand typically occurs between about 4 and 8 pm, many CSP power plants use 3 to 5 hours of thermal storage. With current technology, storage of heat is much cheaper and more efficient than storage of electricity. In this way, the CSP plant can produce electricity day and night. If the CSP site has predictable solar radiation, then the CSP plant becomes a reliable power plant. Reliability can further be improved by installing a back-up combustion system. The back-up system can use most of the CSP plant, which decreases the cost of the back-up system.

With reliability, unused desert, no pollution, and no fuel costs, the obstacles for large deployment for CSP are cost, aesthetics, land use and similar factors for the necessary connecting high tension lines. Although only a small percentage of the desert is necessary to meet global electricity demand, still a large area must be covered with mirrors or lenses to obtain a significant amount of energy. An important way to decrease cost is the use of a simple design.

When considering land use impacts associated with the exploration and extraction through to transportation and conversion of fossil fuels, which are used for most of our electrical power, utility-scale solar power compares as one of the most land-efficient energy resources available:

The federal government has dedicated nearly 2,000 times more acreage to oil and gas leases than to solar development. In 2010 the Bureau of Land Management approved nine large-scale solar projects, with a total generating capacity of 3,682 megawatts, representing approximately 40,000 acres. In contrast, in 2010, the Bureau of Land Management processed more than 5,200 applications for gas and oil leases, and issued 1,308 leases, for a total of 3.2 million acres. Currently, 38.2 million acres of onshore public lands and an additional 36.9 million acres of offshore exploration in the Gulf of Mexico are under lease for oil and gas development, exploration and production.

=== System designs ===
During the day the sun has different positions. For low concentration systems (and low temperatures) tracking can be avoided (or limited to a few positions per year) if nonimaging optics are used. For higher concentrations, however, if the mirrors or lenses do not move, then the focus of the mirrors or lenses changes. A tracking system that follows the position of the sun is required. The tracking system increases the cost and complexity. With this in mind, different designs can be distinguished in how they concentrate the light and track the position of the sun.

==== Parabolic trough designs ====
Sketch of a parabolic trough design. A change of position of the sun parallel to the receiver does not require adjustment of the mirrors.

Parabolic trough power plants use a curved, mirrored trough which reflects the direct solar radiation onto a glass tube containing a fluid (also called a receiver, absorber or collector) running the length of the trough, positioned at the focal point of the reflectors. The trough is parabolic along one axis and linear in the orthogonal axis. For change of the daily position of the sun perpendicular to the receiver, the trough tilts east to west so that the direct radiation remains focused on the receiver. However, seasonal changes in the angle of sunlight parallel to the trough does not require adjustment of the mirrors, since the light is simply concentrated elsewhere on the receiver. Thus the trough design does not require tracking on a second axis. The receiver may be enclosed in a glass vacuum chamber. The vacuum significantly reduces convective heat loss.

A fluid (also called heat transfer fluid) passes through the receiver and becomes very hot. Common fluids are synthetic oil, molten salt and pressurized steam. The fluid containing the heat is transported to a heat engine where about a third of the heat is converted to electricity.

Full-scale parabolic trough systems consist of troughs laid out in parallel over a large area of land. Since 1985, the Solar Energy Generating Systems (SEGS) system has been using this principle, and is in full operation in California. Currently, however, the parabolic trough design is the most thoroughly proven CSP technology.

The SEGS is a collection of nine plants with a total capacity of 354 MW and has been the world's largest solar power plant, both thermal and non-thermal, for many years. A newer plant is Nevada Solar One plant with a capacity of 64 MW. The 150 MW Andasol solar power stations are in Spain with each site having a capacity of 50 MW. Note however, that those plants have heat storage which requires a larger field of solar collectors relative to the size of the steam turbine-generator to store heat and send heat to the steam turbine at the same time. Heat storage enables better utilization of the steam turbine. With day and some nighttime operation of the steam-turbine Andasol 1 at 50 MW peak capacity produces more energy than Nevada Solar One at 64 MW peak capacity, due to the former plant's thermal energy storage system and larger solar field. The 280 MW Solana Generating Station came online in Arizona in 2013 with 6 hours of power storage. Hassi R'Mel integrated solar combined cycle power station in Algeria and Martin Next Generation Solar Energy Center both use parabolic troughs in a combined cycle with natural gas.

==== Enclosed trough ====
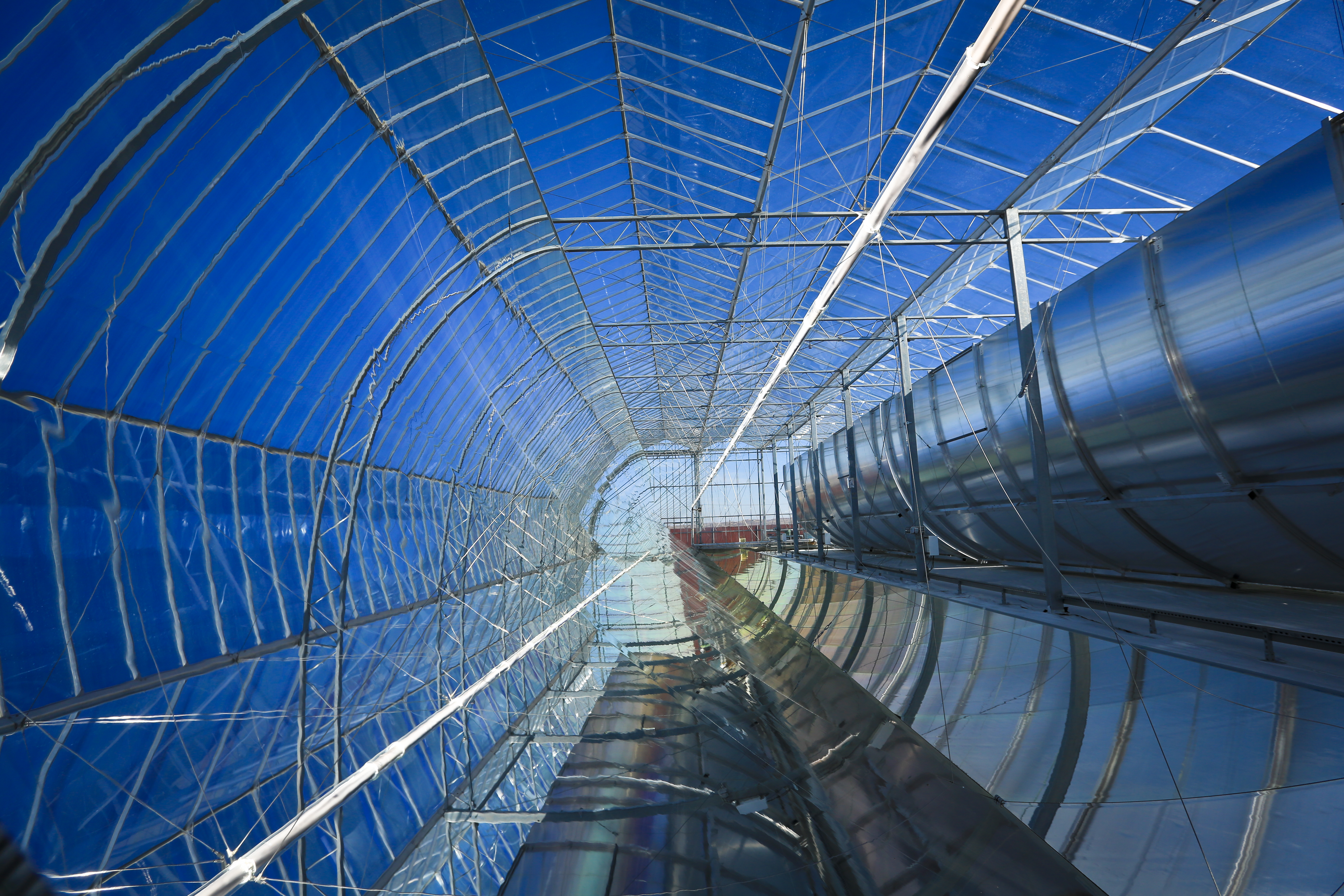
Inside an enclosed trough system

The enclosed trough architecture encapsulates the solar thermal system within a greenhouse-like glasshouse. The glasshouse creates a protected environment to withstand the elements that can negatively impact reliability and efficiency of the solar thermal system.

Lightweight curved solar-reflecting mirrors are suspended within the glasshouse structure. A single-axis tracking system positions the mirrors to track the sun and focus its light onto a network of stationary steel pipes, also suspended from the glasshouse structure. Steam is generated directly, using oil field-quality water, as water flows from the inlet throughout the length of the pipes, without heat exchangers or intermediate working fluids.

The steam produced is then fed directly to the field's existing steam distribution network, where the steam is continuously injected deep into the oil reservoir. Sheltering the mirrors from the wind allows them to achieve higher temperature rates and prevents dust from building up as a result from exposure to humidity. GlassPoint Solar, the company that created the Enclosed Trough design, states its technology can produce heat for EOR for about $5 per million British thermal units in sunny regions, compared to between $10 and $12 for other conventional solar thermal technologies.

GlassPoint's enclosed trough system has been utilized at the Miraah facility in Oman, and a new project has recently been announced for the company to bring its enclosed trough technology to the South Belridge Oil Field, near Bakersfield, California.

==== Power tower designs ====
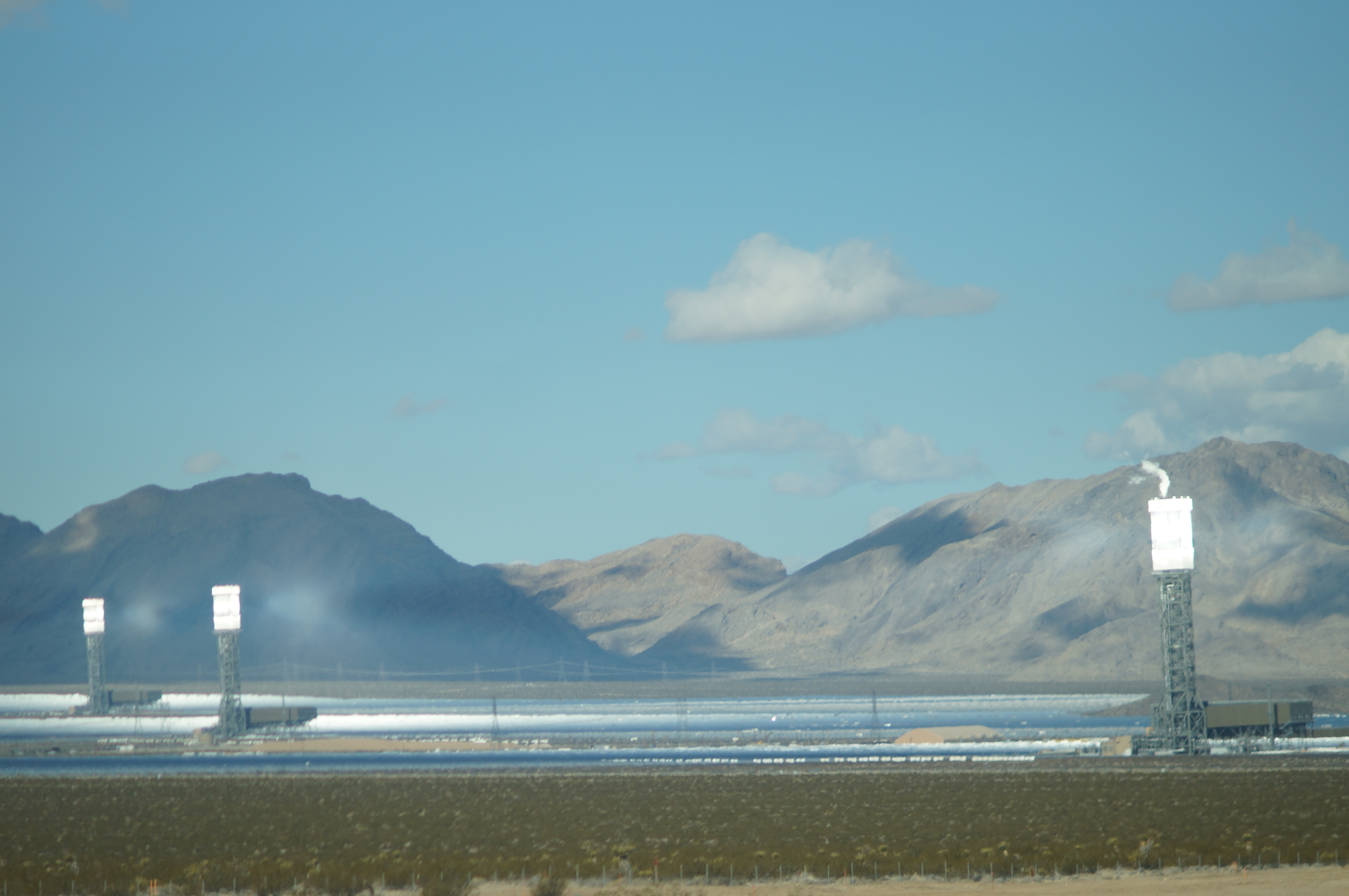
Ivanpah Solar Electric Generating System with all three towers under load, Feb., 2014. Taken from I-15 in San Bernardino County, California. The Clark Mountain Range can be seen in the distance.

Power towers (also known as 'central tower' power plants or 'heliostat' power plants) capture and focus the sun's thermal energy with thousands of tracking mirrors (called heliostats) in roughly a two square mile field. A tower resides in the center of the heliostat field. The heliostats focus concentrated sunlight on a receiver which sits on top of the tower. Within the receiver the concentrated sunlight heats molten salt to over 1,000 °F (538 °C). The heated molten salt then flows into a thermal storage tank where it is stored, maintaining 98% thermal efficiency, and eventually pumped to a steam generator. The steam drives a standard turbine to generate electricity. This process, also known as the "Rankine cycle", is similar to a standard coal-fired power plant, except it is fueled by solar energy.

The advantage of this design above the parabolic trough design is the higher temperature. Thermal energy at higher temperatures can be converted to electricity more efficiently and can be more cheaply stored for later use. Furthermore, there is less need to flatten the ground area. In principle a power tower can be built on the side of a hill. Mirrors can be flat and plumbing is concentrated in the tower. The disadvantage is that each mirror must have its own dual-axis control, while in the parabolic trough design single axis tracking can be shared for a large array of mirrors.

A cost/performance comparison between power tower and parabolic trough concentrators was made by the NREL which estimated that by 2020 electricity could be produced from power towers for 5.47 ¢/kWh and for 6.21 ¢/kWh from parabolic troughs. The capacity factor for power towers was estimated to be 72.9% and 56.2% for parabolic troughs. There is some hope that the development of cheap, durable, mass producible heliostat power plant components could bring this cost down.

The first commercial tower power plant was PS10 in Spain with a capacity of 11 MW, completed in 2007. Since then a number of plants have been proposed, several have been built in a number of countries (Spain, Germany, U.S., Turkey, China, India) but several proposed plants were cancelled as photovoltaic solar prices plummeted. A solar power tower went online in South Africa in 2016. Ivanpah Solar Power Facility in California generates 392 MW of electricity from three towers, making it the largest solar power tower plant when it came online in late 2013.

==== Dish designs ====
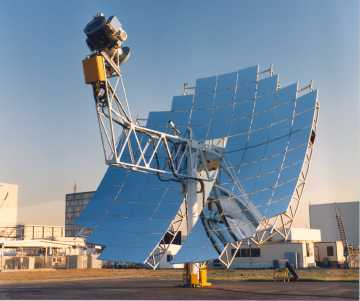
A parabolic solar dish concentrating the sun's rays on the heating element of a Stirling engine. The entire unit acts as a solar tracker.

A dish Stirling system uses a large, reflective, parabolic dish (similar in shape to a satellite television dish). It focuses all the sunlight that strikes the dish up onto a single point above the dish, where a receiver captures the heat and transforms it into a useful form. Typically the dish is coupled with a Stirling engine in a Dish-Stirling System, but also sometimes a steam engine is used. These create rotational kinetic energy that can be converted to electricity using an electric generator.

In 2005 Southern California Edison announced an agreement to purchase solar powered Stirling engines from Stirling Energy Systems over a twenty-year period and in quantities (20,000 units) sufficient to generate 500 megawatts of electricity. In January 2010, Stirling Energy Systems and Tessera Solar commissioned the first demonstration 1.5-megawatt power plant ("Maricopa Solar") using Stirling technology in Peoria, Arizona. At the beginning of 2011 Stirling Energy's development arm, Tessera Solar, sold off its two large projects, the 709 MW Imperial project and the 850 MW Calico project to AES Solar and K.Road, respectively. In 2012 the Maricopa plant was bought and dismantled by United Sun Systems. United Sun Systems released a new generation system, based on a V-shaped Stirling engine and a peak production of 33 kW. The new CSP-Stirling technology brings down LCOE to US$0.02 in utility scale.

According to its developer, Rispasso Energy, a Swedish firm, in 2015 its Dish Sterling system being tested in the Kalahari Desert in South Africa showed 34% efficiency.

==== Fresnel technologies ====
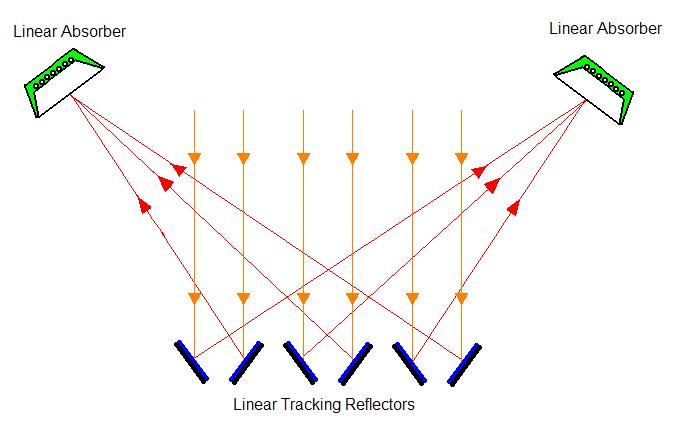
Fresnel reflector

A linear Fresnel reflector power plant uses a series of long, narrow, shallow-curvature (or even flat) mirrors to focus light onto one or more linear receivers positioned above the mirrors. On top of the receiver a small parabolic mirror can be attached for further focusing the light. These systems aim to offer lower overall costs by sharing a receiver between several mirrors (as compared with trough and dish concepts), while still using the simple line-focus geometry with one axis for tracking. This is similar to the trough design (and different from central towers and dishes with dual-axis). The receiver is stationary and so fluid couplings are not required (as in troughs and dishes). The mirrors also do not need to support the receiver, so they are structurally simpler. When suitable aiming strategies are used (mirrors aimed at different receivers at different times of day), this can allow a denser packing of mirrors on available land area.

Rival single axis tracking technologies include the relatively new linear Fresnel reflector (LFR) and compact-LFR (CLFR) technologies. The LFR differs from that of the parabolic trough in that the absorber is fixed in space above the mirror field. Also, the reflector is composed of many low row segments, which focus collectively on an elevated long tower receiver running parallel to the reflector rotational axis.

Prototypes of Fresnel lens concentrators have been produced for the collection of thermal energy by International Automated Systems. No full-scale thermal systems using Fresnel lenses are known to be in operation, although products incorporating Fresnel lenses in conjunction with photovoltaic cells are already available.

==== MicroCSP ====
MicroCSP is used for community-sized power plants (1 MW to 50 MW), for industrial, agricultural and manufacturing 'process heat' applications, and when large amounts of hot water are needed, such as resort swimming pools, water parks, large laundry facilities, sterilization, distillation and other such uses.

== Heat collection and exchange ==
Heat in a solar thermal system is guided by five basic principles: heat gain; heat transfer; heat storage; heat transport; and heat insulation. Here, heat is the measure of the amount of thermal energy an object contains and is determined by the temperature, mass and specific heat of the object. Solar thermal power plants use heat exchangers that are designed for constant working conditions, to provide heat exchange. Copper heat exchangers are important in solar thermal heating and cooling systems because of copper's high thermal conductivity, resistance to atmospheric and water corrosion, sealing and joining by soldering, and mechanical strength. Copper is used both in receivers and in primary circuits (pipes and heat exchangers for water tanks) of solar thermal water systems.

Heat gain is the heat accumulated from the sun in the system. Solar thermal heat is trapped using the greenhouse effect; the greenhouse effect in this case is the ability of a reflective surface to transmit short wave radiation and reflect long wave radiation. Heat and infrared radiation (IR) are produced when short wave radiation light hits the absorber plate, which is then trapped inside the collector. Fluid, usually water, in the absorber tubes collect the trapped heat and transfer it to a heat storage vault.

Heat is transferred either by conduction or convection. When water is heated, kinetic energy is transferred by conduction to water molecules throughout the medium. These molecules spread their thermal energy by conduction and occupy more space than the cold slow moving molecules above them. The distribution of energy from the rising hot water to the sinking cold water contributes to the convection process. Heat is transferred from the absorber plates of the collector in the fluid by conduction. The collector fluid is circulated through the carrier pipes to the heat transfer vault. Inside the vault, heat is transferred throughout the medium through convection.

Heat storage enables solar thermal plants to produce electricity during hours without sunlight. Heat is transferred to a thermal storage medium in an insulated reservoir during hours with sunlight, and is withdrawn for power generation during hours lacking sunlight. Thermal storage mediums will be discussed in a heat storage section. Rate of heat transfer is related to the conductive and convection medium as well as the temperature differences. Bodies with large temperature differences transfer heat faster than bodies with lower temperature differences.

Heat transport refers to the activity in which heat from a solar collector is transported to the heat storage vault. Heat insulation is vital in both heat transport tubing as well as the storage vault. It prevents heat loss, which in turn relates to energy loss, or decrease in the efficiency of the system.

== Heat storage for electric base loads ==
Heat storage allows a solar thermal plant to produce electricity at night and on overcast days. This allows the use of solar power for baseload generation as well as peak power generation, with the potential of displacing both coal- and natural gas-fired power plants. Additionally, the utilization of the generator is higher which reduces cost. Even short-term storage can help by smoothing out the "duck curve" of rapid change in generation requirements at sunset when a grid includes large amounts of solar capacity.

Heat is transferred to a thermal storage medium in an insulated reservoir during the day, and withdrawn for power generation at night. Thermal storage media include pressurized steam, concrete, a variety of phase change materials, and molten salts such as calcium, sodium and potassium nitrate.

=== Steam accumulator ===
The PS10 solar power tower stores heat in tanks as pressurized steam at 50 bar (700 psi) and 285 °C (545 °F). The steam condenses and flashes back to steam, when pressure is lowered. Storage is for one hour. It is suggested that longer storage is possible, but that has not been proven in an existing power plant.

=== Molten salt storage ===
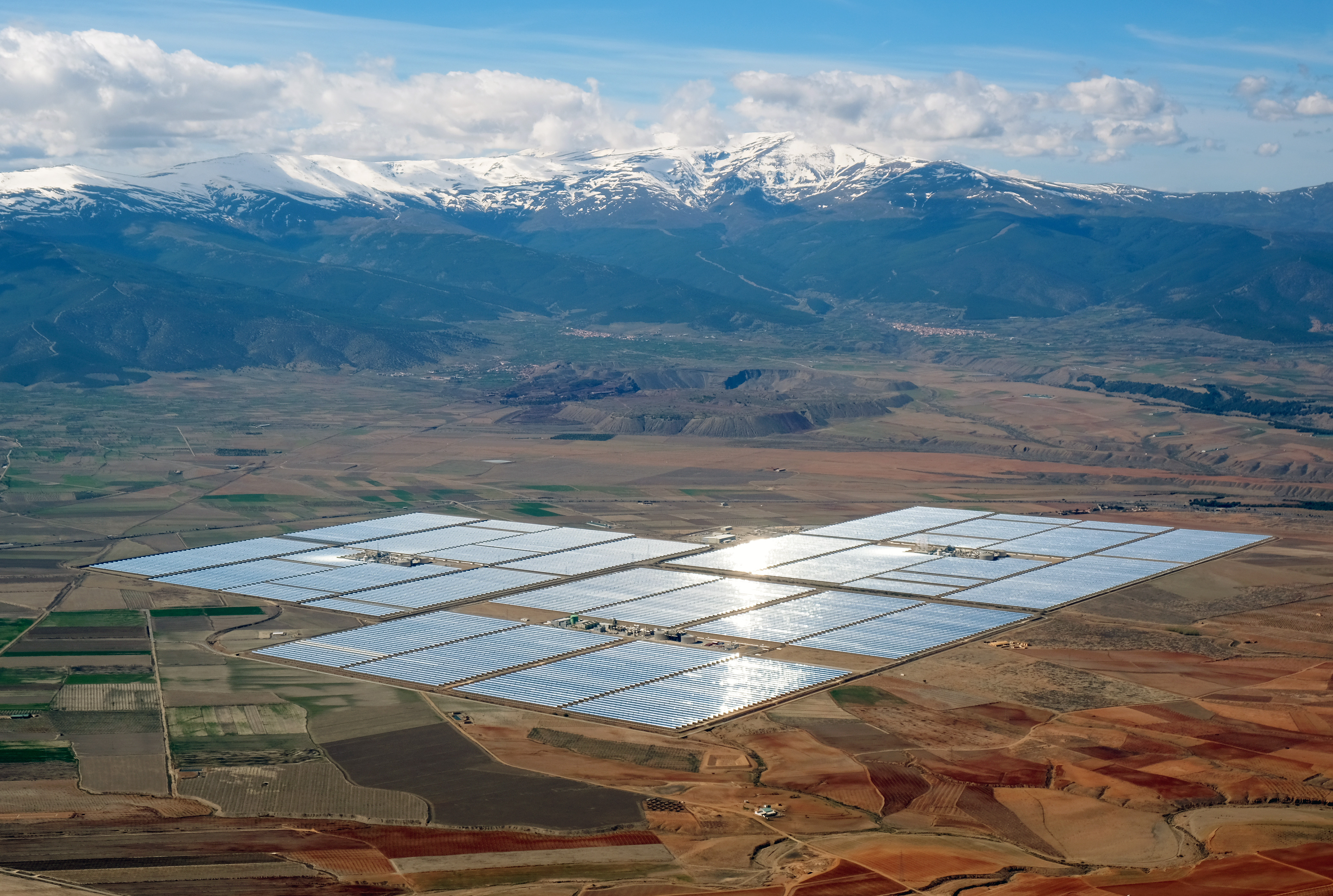
The 150 MW Andasol solar power station is a commercial parabolic trough solar thermal power plant, located in Spain. The Andasol plant uses tanks of molten salt to store solar energy so that it can continue generating electricity even when the sun is not shining.

Molten salt is used to transport heat in solar power tower systems because it is liquid at atmospheric pressure, provides a low-cost medium to store thermal energy, its operating temperatures are compatible with today's steam turbines, and it is non-flammable and nontoxic. Molten salt is also used in the chemical and metals industries to transport heat.

The first commercial molten salt mixture was a common form of saltpeter, 60% sodium nitrate and 40% potassium nitrate. Saltpeter melts at 220 °C (430 °F) and is kept liquid at 290 °C (550 °F) in an insulated storage tank. Calcium nitrate can reduce the melting point to 131 °C (268 °F), permitting more energy to be extracted before the salt freezes. There are now several technical calcium nitrate grades stable at more than 500 °C (1000 °F).

This solar power system can generate power in cloudy weather or at night using the heat in the tank of hot salt. The tanks are insulated, able to store heat for a week. Tanks that power a 100-megawatt turbine for four hours would be about 9 m (30 ft) tall and 24 m (80 ft) in diameter.

The Andasol power plant in Spain is the first commercial solar thermal power plant using molten salt for heat storage and nighttime generation. It came on line March 2009. On July 4, 2011, a company in Spain celebrated an historic moment for the solar industry: Torresol's 19.9 MW concentrating solar power plant became the first ever to generate uninterrupted electricity for 24 hours straight, using a molten salt heat storage.

In January 2019 Shouhang Energy Saving Dunhuang 100MW molten salt tower solar energy photothermal power station project was connected to grid and started operating. Its configuration includes an 11-hour molten salt heat storage system and can generate power consecutively for 24 hours.

=== Phase-change materials for storage ===
Phase change materials (PCMs) offer an alternative solution in energy storage. Using a similar heat transfer infrastructure, PCMs have the potential of providing a more efficient means of storage. PCMs can be either organic or inorganic materials. Advantages of organic PCMs include no corrosives, low or no undercooling, and chemical and thermal stability. Disadvantages include low phase-change enthalpy, low thermal conductivity, and flammability. Inorganics are advantageous with greater phase-change enthalpy, but exhibit disadvantages with undercooling, corrosion, phase separation, and lack of thermal stability. The greater phase-change enthalpy in inorganic PCMs make hydrate salts a strong candidate in the solar energy storage field.

== Use of water ==
A design which requires water for condensation or cooling may conflict with location of solar thermal plants in desert areas with good solar radiation but limited water resources. The conflict is illustrated by plans of Solar Millennium, a German company, to build a plant in the Amargosa Valley of Nevada which would require 20% of the water available in the area. Some other projected plants by the same and other companies in the Mojave Desert of California may also be affected by difficulty in obtaining adequate and appropriate water rights. California water law currently prohibits use of potable water for cooling.

Other designs require less water. The Ivanpah Solar Power Facility in south-eastern California conserves scarce desert water by using air-cooling to convert the steam back into water. Compared to conventional wet-cooling, this results in a 90% reduction in water usage at the cost of some loss of efficiency. The water is then returned to the boiler in a closed process which is environmentally friendly.

== Electrical conversion efficiency ==
Of all of these technologies the solar dish/Stirling engine has the highest energy efficiency. A single solar dish-Stirling engine installed at Sandia National Laboratories National Solar Thermal Test Facility (NSTTF) produces as much as 25 kW of electricity, with a conversion efficiency of 31.25%.

Solar parabolic trough plants have been built with efficiencies of about 20%. Fresnel reflectors have a slightly lower efficiency (but this is compensated by the denser packing).

The gross conversion efficiencies (taking into account that the solar dishes or troughs occupy only a fraction of the total area of the power plant) are determined by net generating capacity over the solar energy that falls on the total area of the solar plant. The 500-megawatt (MW) SCE/SES plant would extract about 2.75% of the radiation (1 kW/m^{2}; see Solar power § Energy from the Sun for a discussion) that falls on its 4,500 acres (18.2 km^{2}). For the 50 MW AndaSol Power Plant that is being built in Spain (total area 1.95 km^{2}; 3/4 sq. mi.) gross conversion efficiency comes out to 2.6%.

Efficiency does not directly relate to cost: total cost includes the cost of construction and maintenance.

== Standards ==
- EN 12975 (efficiency test)

== See also ==
- Central solar heating
- Dover Sun House
- Energy tower (downdraft)
- EnerWorks
- List of solar thermal power stations
- Photovoltaic thermal hybrid solar collector
- Solar power plants in the Mojave Desert
- Solar tracker
- Solar updraft tower
- Biological wood oxidation
- Compost heater
- Ocean thermal energy conversion
