= Water recycling shower =

Showers that use a basin and a pump to re-use the showering water

Water recycling showers (also known as recycle showers, circulation showers or re-circulation showers) are showers that use a basin and a pump to re-use the water during a shower session. The technology is used to reduce the use of drinking water and primary energy consumption for water heating. By lowering the (household) hot water demand, water recycling showers also allow for smaller heating appliances, like boilers, solar water heating systems and other HVAC solutions.

== History ==
The first recycling shower, operated by a hand pump, was patented in England in 1767 by the stove maker William Feetham. This recycling shower used the pump to push the water into a basin above the user's head. To receive the water, the user pulled a chain to release the water from the basin. Like this, the invention would recycle the same dirty water during the entire session. It also gradually lost temperature.

It was not until 200 years later, in 1979, that Billy G. Bloys invented a motorized version of the same concept, discarding the hand pump. Using no filtration or a means of re-heating the water, the contraption likened the original invention by Feetham but did not improve on it beyond the electronic pump and some fixtures. It was never commercialized. In 1988, Francis R. Keeler patented a similar but smaller and more mobile version of the recycling shower for usage in motor homes, boats and airplanes.

In 2011, Nick Christy of Australia won the Postcode Lottery Green Challenge, an annual competition for sustainable ideas for his version of the water recycling shower. The shower aimed to collect, filter, pasteurize and then dilute the water with fresh tap water to cool it again to the set temperature. Citing cultural problems and lack of traction in his native Australia, Christy aimed for the UK market. They are yet to collect certification standards.

In 2013, the Swedish company Orbital Systems introduces their first shower, the launching company being a spinoff from a NASA internship. It comprises a closed-loop system where the water is purified using a replaceable filter. These filter out particulate matter and microbes from drain water before sending the water back through the head. After the capsules have been depleted, they have to be replaced at cost. Orbital Systems has had several high-profile investors, including Skype and Kazaa co-founder Niklas Zennström and Karl-Johan Persson, CEO of the fashion company H&M.

In 2015, the Dutch company Hamwells introduced the e-Shower at the TechCrunch Disrupt conference in London. Citing hygiene issues in earlier solutions, Hamwells opted for a solution with a semi-closed loop where the water is used several times instead of the entire session. External hot water is used to maintain temperature, with incoming hot water replacing the used water within the loop. In addition to replacement, water within the loop is filtered and purified with UV light. For users unable or unwilling to use the recycling mode, the e-Shower offers a classic shower where all the water is drained. Being a computer, the e-Shower is able to self-clean, regulate shower times between users and offer the user music streaming and remote control through mobile apps.

== Benefits ==
Water recycling showers have been explored by people who wish to conserve water and the energy needed to heat the water, for both environmental and economic reasons.

=== Energy savings ===
According to the U.S. Department of Energy, water heating is typically the second-largest energy expense in homes (after space heating). Mostly destined for the shower, it accounts for roughly 17% of total household energy consumption. Energy efficiency was the main driver behind the federal regulation, mandating the top flow of a shower head to be restricted to 2.5 gallons per minute. Manufacturers of recycling showers typically claim a 70% to 90% reduction in shower energy consumption.

=== Water savings ===
Nearly 1.2 trillion gallons of water is used in the United States annually just for showering. This is enough to supply the water needs of New York and New Jersey for a year. Manufacturers of recycling showers typically claim an 80% to 90% reduction in shower water consumption.

Also, before the shower reaches the set temperature, users leave the tap running. Typically 20 percent of every shower session is essentially lost this way.

== See also ==
- Water heat recycling – Use of a heat exchanger to recover energy and reuse heat from drain water
