= Water heat recycling =

Use of a heat exchanger to recover energy and reuse heat from drain water

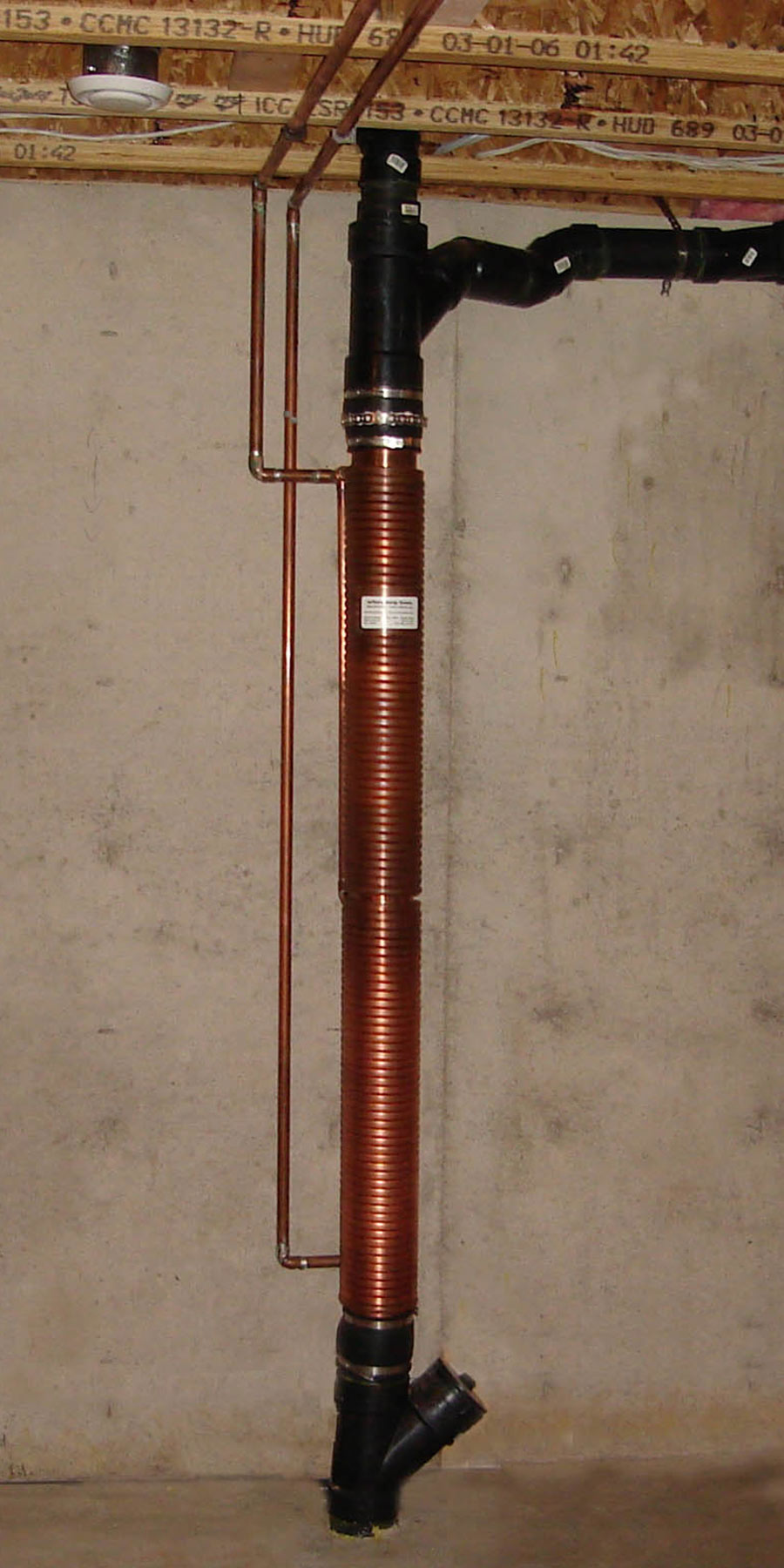
Installation of a double-walled copper-on-copper heat exchanger in a vertical section of the master drain line in a Canadian home (2007)

Water heat recycling (also known as drain water heat recovery, waste water heat recovery, greywater heat recovery, or sometimes shower water heat recovery) is the use of a heat exchanger to recover energy and reuse heat from drain water from various activities such as dishwashing, clothes washing and especially showers. The technology is used to reduce primary energy consumption for water heating by preheating the water and putting less strain on the designated water-heating unit, which can extend the life of your water heater and save on energy usage. On a smaller scale, water heat recycling can save a significant amount of energy in household application due to the reduction of need of external energy. If done on a larger scale, this reduction of energy usage could help ease climate change because it would reduce the dependence on fossil fuels. For this reason, many scholars look to water heat recycling as the future of energy efficiency for benefits both economical and environmental.

== How it works ==
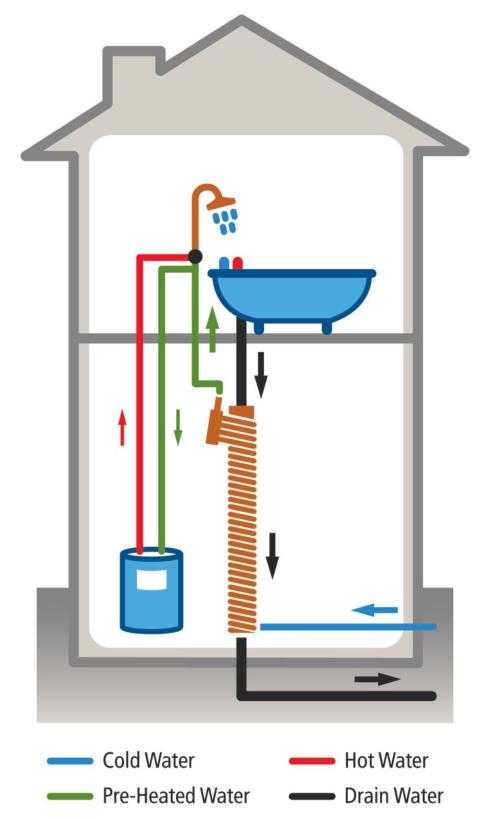
Diagram showing how a waste water heat recovery unit can be installed into a house

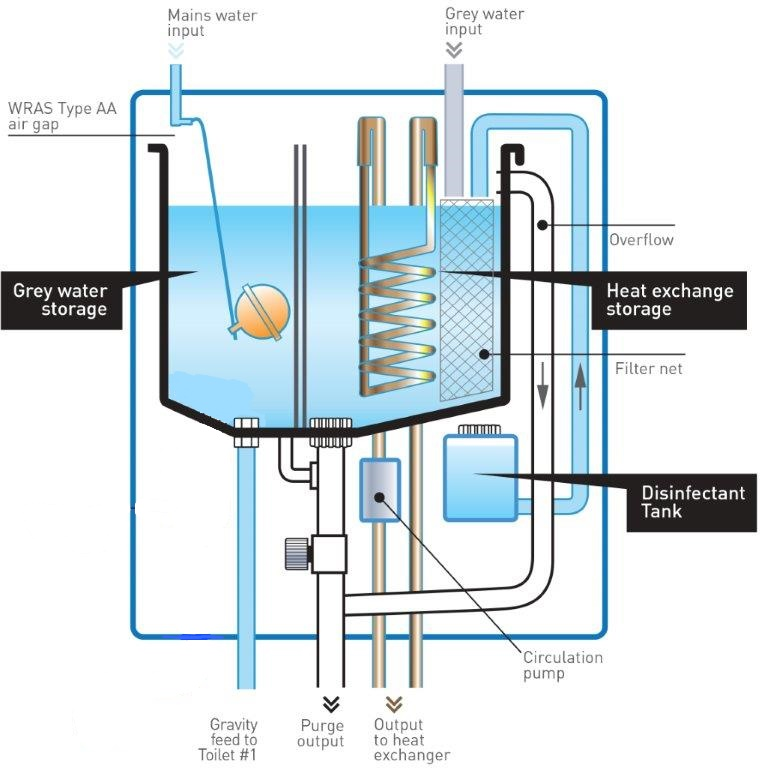
Heat Recovery schematic system within a greywater recycling unit

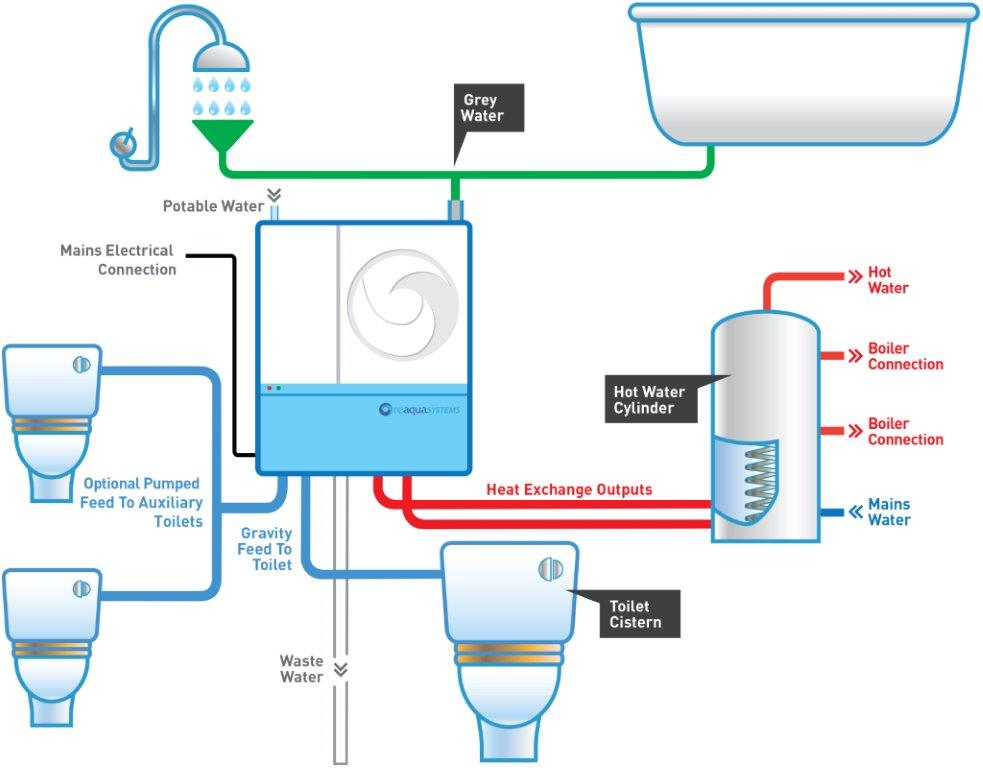
Heat Recovery system incorporated within a greywater recycling system

The cold water that is put into a water heating device can be preheated using the reclaimed thermal energy from a shower so that the input water does not need as much energy to be heated before being used in a shower, dishwasher, or sink. The water entering a storage tank is usually close to 11 °C (52 °F) but by recovering the energy in the hot water from a bath or dishwasher, the temperature of the water entering the holding tank can be elevated to 25 °C (77 °F), saving energy required to increase the temperature of a given amount of water by 14 °C (57 °F). This water is then heated up a little further to 37 °C (99 °F) before leaving the tank and going to the average shower.

When recycling water from a bath (100–150 litres) or shower (50–80 litres) the waste water temperature is circa 20–25 °C. An in-house greywater recycling tank holds 150–175 litres allowing for the majority of waste water to be stored. Utilizing a built in copper heat exchange with circulation pump the residual heat is recovered and transferred to the cold feed of a combi-boiler or hot-water cylinder, reducing the energy used by the existing central heating system to heat water.

There are three categories in which waste heat may be categorized into: Low-grade waste heat (less than 100 °C), Medium-grade waste heat (100-400 °C), and High-Grade waste heat (greater than 400 °C). While all of these can be converted into energy, medium-grade waste heat is the most common in household applications.

Waste heat from common home applications can also be used to convert salty water into clean, drinkable water. Although this process is only in the beginning of its development, it shows strong promise for the future of clean water and energy efficiency. This process of desalination could be the future of clean water across the globe. Because this process uses so much energy, it could be used in conjunction with water heat recycling to reduce energy costs.

== Impact and cost ==
Heating water accounts for 18% of the average household utility bill. Standard units save up to 60% of the heat energy that is otherwise lost down the drain when using the shower.

Installing a water heat recycler reduces energy consumption and thus greenhouse gas emissions and the overall energy dependency of the household. In the commercial sector, 20-50% of energy used is wasted as heat escaping, which not only is inefficient, but also harmful for the environment.

Typical retail price for a domestic drain water heat recovery unit ranges from around $400 to $1,000 Canadian ($150-700 USD). For a regular household, water heating is usually about 20% of overall energy demand. The energy savings can result in an average payback time for the initial investment of 2–10 years.

A 2-year independent study of waste water heat recovery systems installed into residential houses in the UK found savings of 380kWh and 500kWh per person per year.

== Industrial scale and HVAC ==
A heat pump can be combined with municipal sewage lines to allow a large building's HVAC system recycle the winter heat or summer cool (compared to the outside air) of water flowing out of many homes and businesses.

The reverse is also possible: heat from air conditioning and industrial chillers can be used to pre-heat water. Heat rejected by a chiller system for providing air-conditioning to larger buildings can be recovered by installing a heat-exchanger between the incoming domestic cold water, and condenser water return. A conventional chilled water system rejects heat gathered by the condenser water loop from the refrigerant to a cooling tower. By diverting a fraction of mass flow rate of condenser water away from the cooling tower, and circulating it through a heat-exchanger (usually a plate-and-frame configuration), incoming domestic cold water can be pre-heated before reaching the boiler. This reduces the required increase in temperature of the water before it can be supplied to the end user, and therefore lowering boiler fuel burn. Even just this slight increase in efficiency of energy has significant impacts on the slowing of global warming.

== See also ==
- Green building – Structures and processes of building structures that are more environmentally responsible
- Heat recovery ventilation – Method of reusing thermal energy in a building
- Low-energy building – House designed for reduced energy use
- Pinch analysis – Method in chemical engineering
- Renewable heat – Application of renewable energy
- Solar water heating – Use of sunlight for water heating with a solar thermal collector
- Water recycling shower – Showers that use a basin and a pump to re-use the showering water
- Zero energy building – Energy efficiency standard for buildings
