= Solar air heat =

Solar thermal technology

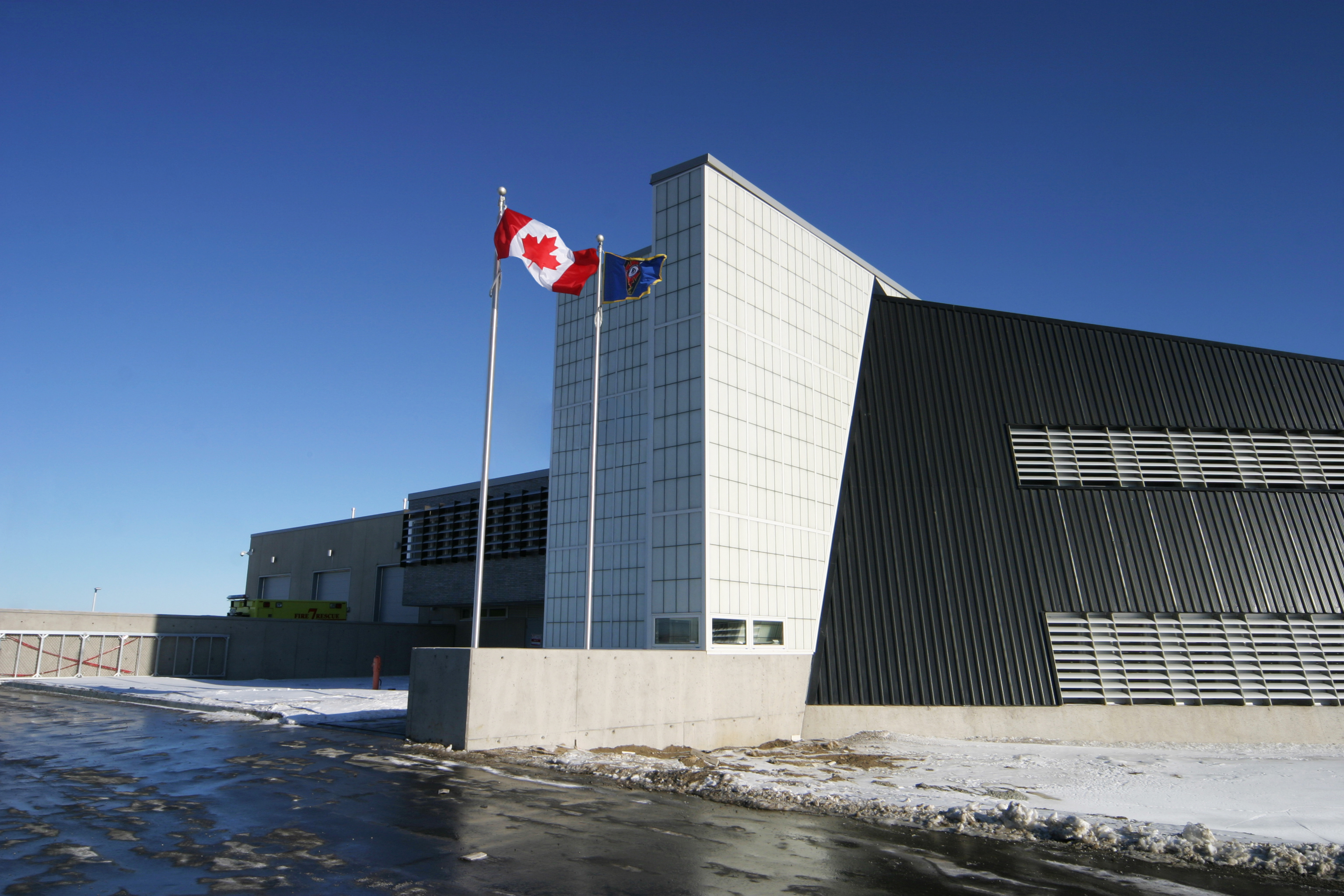
The front façade of this building is a transpired solar air heating system that heats the incoming ventilation air for the facility.

Solar air heating is a solar thermal technology in which the energy from the sun, insolation, is captured by an absorbing medium and used to heat air. Solar air heating is a renewable energy heating technology used to heat or condition air for buildings or process heat applications. It is typically the most cost-effective out of all the solar technologies, especially in commercial and industrial applications, and it addresses the largest usage of building energy in heating climates, which is space heating and industrial process heating.

Solar air collectors can be divided into two categories:

- Unglazed air collectors or transpired solar collector (used primarily to heat ambient air in commercial, industrial, agriculture and process applications)
- Glazed solar collectors (recirculating types that are usually used for space heating)

== Collector types ==
Solar collectors for air heat may be classified by their air distribution paths or by their materials, such as glazed or unglazed. For example:

- Through-pass collectors
- Front-pass
- Back pass
- Combination front and back pass collectors
- Unglazed
- Glazed

=== Unglazed air collectors and transpired solar collectors ===
==== Background ====
The term "unglazed air collector" refers to a solar air heating system that consists of an absorber without any glass or glazing over top. The most common type of unglazed collector on the market is the transpired solar collector. This technology was invented and patented by Canadian engineer John Hollick of Conserval Engineering Inc. in the 1990s, who worked with the U.S. Department of Energy (NREL) and Natural Resources Canada on the commercialization of the technology around the world. The technology has been extensively monitored by these government agencies, and Natural Resources Canada developed the feasibility tool RETScreen to model the energy savings from transpired solar collectors. John Hollick and the transpired solar collector were honored by the American Society of Mechanical Engineers (ASME) in 2014 as being one of the best inventions of the industrialized age, alongside Thomas Edison, Henry Ford, the steam engine and the Panama Canal – in a New York exhibition recognizing the best inventions, inventors and engineering feats of the past two centuries.

Several thousand transpired solar collector systems have been installed in a variety of commercial, industrial, institutional, agricultural, and process applications in over 35 countries around the world. The technology was originally used primarily in industrial applications such as manufacturing and assembly plants where there were high ventilation requirements, stratified ceiling heat, and often negative pressure in the building. The first unglazed transpired collector in the world was installed by Ford Motor Company on their assembly plant in Oakville, Canada.

With the increasing drive to install renewable energy systems on buildings, transpired solar collectors are now used across the entire building stock because of high energy production (up to 500–600 peak thermal Watts/square metre), high solar conversion (up to 90%) and lower capital costs when compared against solar photovoltaic and solar water heating.

==== Method of operation ====
Unglazed air collectors heat ambient (outside) air instead of recirculated building air. Transpired solar collectors are usually wall-mounted to capture the lower sun angle in the winter heating months as well as sun reflection off the snow and achieve their optimum performance and return on investment when operating at flow rates of between 4 and 8 CFM per square foot (72 to 144 m^{3}/h.m^{2}) of collector area.

The exterior surface of a transpired solar collector consists of thousands of tiny micro-perforations that allow the boundary layer of heat to be captured and uniformly drawn into an air cavity behind the exterior panels. This solar heated ventilation air is drawn into the building's ventilation system from air outlets positioned along the top of the collector and the air is then distributed in the building via conventional means or using a solar ducting system.

The extensive monitoring by Natural Resources Canada and NREL has shown that transpired solar collector systems reduce between 10–50% of the conventional heating load and that RETScreen is an accurate predictor of system performance.

Transpired solar collectors act as a rainscreen and they also capture heat loss escaping from the building envelope which is collected in the collector air cavity and drawn back into the ventilation system. There is no maintenance required with solar air heating systems and the expected lifespan is over 30 years.

==== Variations of transpired solar collectors ====
Unglazed transpired collectors can also be roof-mounted for applications in which there is not a suitable south facing wall or for other architectural considerations. A number of companies offer transpired air collectors suitable for roof mounting either mounted directly onto a sloped metal roof or as modules affixed to ducts and connected to nearby fans and HVAC units.

Higher temperatures are also possible with transpired collectors which can be configured to heat the air twice to increase the temperature rise making it suitable for space heating of larger buildings. In a 2-stage system, the first stage is the typical unglazed transpired collector and the second stage has glazing covering the transpired collector. The glazing allows all of that heated air from the first stage to be directed through a second set of transpired collectors for a second stage of solar heating.

Another innovation is to recover heat from the photovoltaic (PV) modules (which is often four times more than the electrical energy produced by the PV module) by mounting the PV modules onto the solar air system. In cases where there is a heating requirement, incorporating a solar air component into the PV system provides two technical advantages; it removes the PV heat and allows the PV system to operate closer to its rated efficiency (which is 25 C); and it decreases the total energy payback period associated with the combined system because the heat energy is captured and used to offset conventional heating.

=== Glazed air systems ===
Functioning in a similar manner as a conventional forced air furnace, systems provide heat by recirculating conditioned building air through solar collectors. Through the use of an energy collecting surface to absorb the sun's thermal energy, and ducting air to come in contact with it, a simple and effective collector can be made for a variety of air conditioning and process applications.

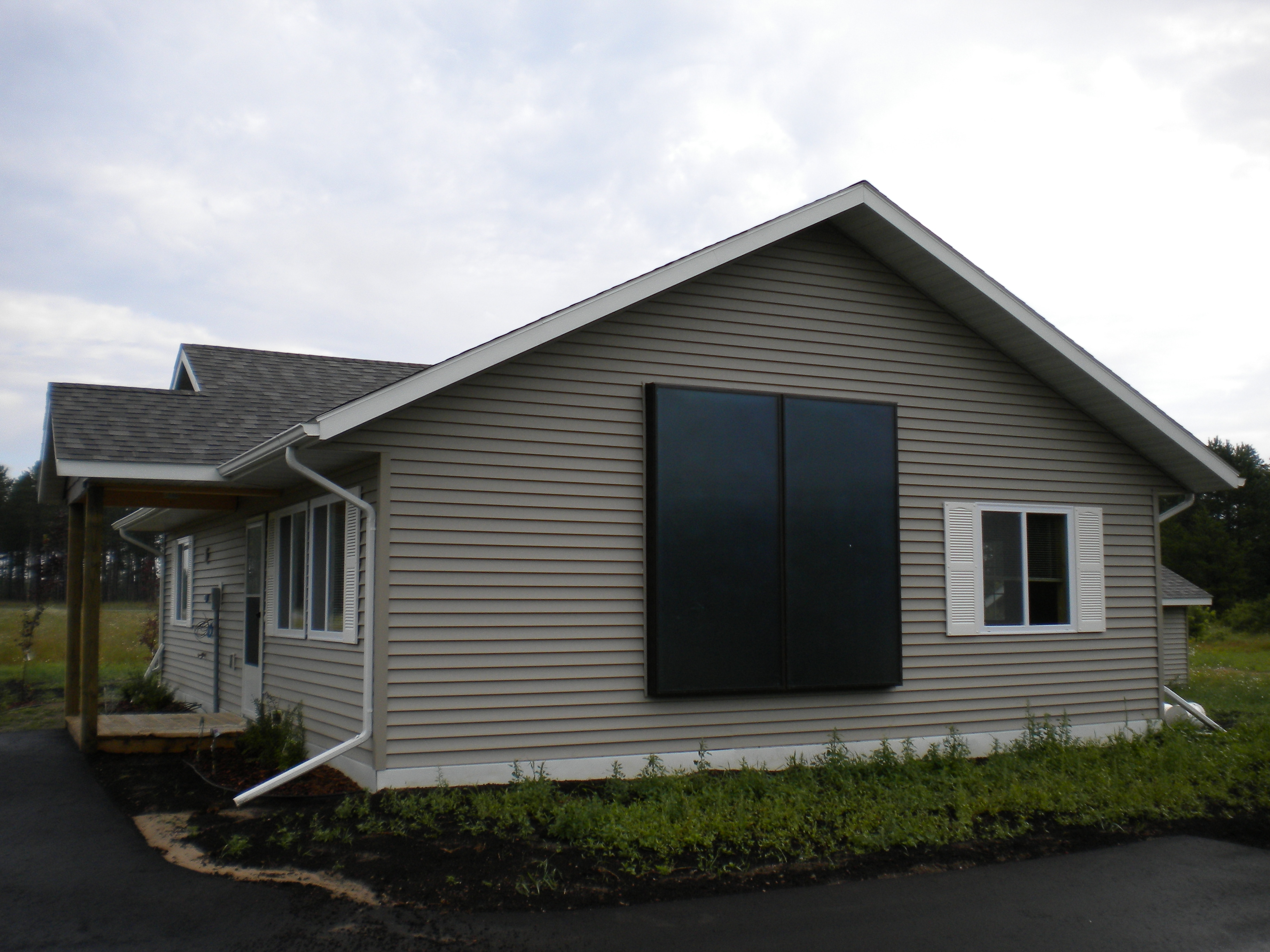
SPF Solar Air Heat Collector

A simple solar air collector consists of an absorber material, sometimes having a selective surface, to capture radiation from the sun and transfers this thermal energy to air via conduction heat transfer. This heated air is then ducted to the building space or to the process area where the heated air is used for space heating or process heating needs.

The pioneering figure for this type of system was George Löf, who built solar heated air system for a house in Boulder, Colorado, in 1945. He later included a gravel bed for heat storage.

=== Through-pass air collector ===
In the through-pass configuration, air ducted onto one side of the absorber passes through a perforated or fibrous type material and is heated from the conductive properties of the material and the convective properties of the moving air. Through-pass absorbers have the most surface area which enables relatively high conductive heat transfer rates, but significant pressure drop can require greater fan power, and deterioration of certain absorber material after many years of solar radiation exposure can additionally create problems with air quality and performance.

=== Back, front, and combination passage air collector ===
In back-pass, front-pass, and combination type configurations the air is directed on either the back, the front, or on both sides of the absorber to be heated from the return to the supply ducting headers. Although passing the air on both sides of the absorber will provide a greater surface area for conductive heat transfer, issues with dust (fouling) can arise from passing air on the front side of the absorber which reduces absorber efficiency by limiting the amount of sunlight received. In cold climates, air passing next to the glazing will additionally cause greater heat loss, resulting in lower overall performance of the collector.

== Solar air heat applications ==
A variety of applications can utilize solar air heat technologies to reduce the carbon footprint from use of conventional heat sources, such as fossil fuels, to create a sustainable means to produce thermal energy. Applications such as space heating, greenhouse season extension, pre-heating ventilation makeup air, or process heat can be addressed by solar air heat devices. In the field of 'solar co-generation' solar thermal technologies are paired with photovoltaics (PV) to increase the efficiency of the system by cooling the PV panels to improve their electrical performance while simultaneously warming air for space heating. Recent applications are combining solar air collectors with air source heat pumps to provide up to 100% renewable heating.

=== Space heating applications ===
Space heating for residential and commercial applications can be done through the use of solar air heating panels. This configuration operates by drawing air from the building envelope or from the outdoor environment and passing it through the collector where the air warms via conduction from the absorber and is then supplied to the living or working space by either passive means or with the assistance of a fan.

Solar air collectors are also ideally suited to provide warm air to air source heat pumps by discharging the solar heated air to the heat pump fan. This increases the COP of the heat pump and protects the fan unit from the harsh winter environment.

=== Process heat applications ===
Solar air heat can also be used in process applications such as drying laundry, crops (i.e. tea, corn, coffee) and other drying applications. Air heated through a solar collector and then passed over a medium to be dried can provide an efficient means by which to reduce the moisture content of the material.

=== Hot water heating ===
A new application for air collectors is heating domestic hot water by supplying warm air to air to water heat pumps which currently draw the heat from the interior of the building. Only 5 to 10 m^{2} of unglazed solar air panels are required to provide the necessary heat source for home hot water systems incorporating the air to water heat pumps.

=== Night cooling applications ===
Radiation cooling to the night sky is based on the principle of heat loss by long-wave radiation from a warm surface (roof) to another body at a lower temperature (sky). On a clear night, a typical sky-facing surface can cool at a rate of about 75 W/m^{2} (25 BTU/hr/ft^{2}) This means that a metal roof facing the sky will be colder than the surrounding air temperature. Collectors can take advantage of this cooling phenomena. As warm night air touches the cooler surface of a transpired collector, heat is transferred to the metal, radiated to the sky and the cooled air is then drawn in through the perforated surface. Cool air may then be drawn into HVAC units.

=== Ventilation applications ===
By drawing air through a properly designed air collector or air heater, solar heated fresh air can reduce the heating load during sunny operation. Applications include transpired collectors preheating fresh air entering a heat recovery ventilator, or suction created by venting heated air out of some other solar chimney.

== See also ==
- List of low-energy building techniques
- Low-energy house
- Passive house
- Passive solar building design
- Solarwall
- Sustainable architecture
- Zero-energy building
