= EnerWorks =

EnerWorks Inc. is a North American solar thermal technology provider headquartered in Woodstock, Ontario, which develops and manufactures renewable energy appliances for the residential, commercial and industrial markets.

EnerWorks solar water heating appliances were the first to qualify for the USDOEs "Energy Star" residential water heater program.

In 2009, in conjunction with Vanir Energy, EnerWorks constructed what both companies considered the largest solar thermal heating and cooling installation in the world at that time, comprising 640 collectors on a 1-million square-foot location in Fletcher, North Carolina.

== See also ==
- Renewable energy in the United States
