= Compost heater =

System for space heating using biomass

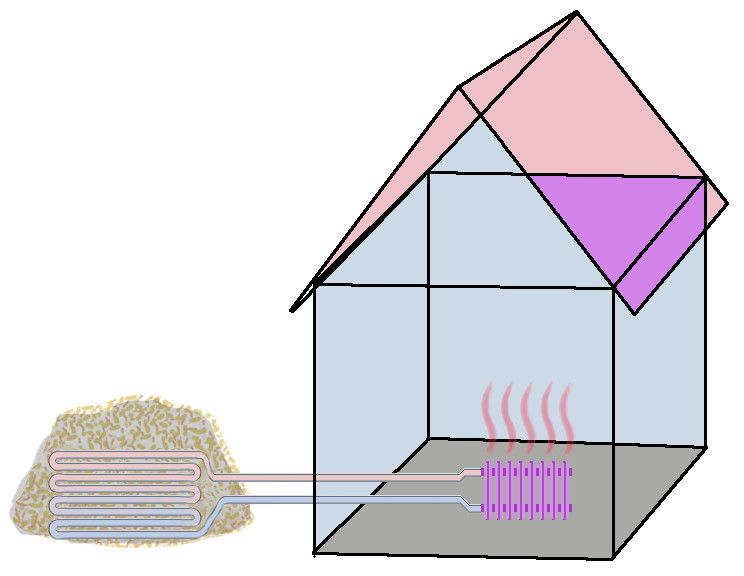
Using the heat of an external compost heap for warming up the inside of a house

A compost heater (or Biomeiler) is a structure for the energetic use of biomass for the heating of buildings.

A method relying on biological wood oxidation was developed by Jean Pain in the 1970s. Compost heaters are used primarily for demonstration purposes as small systems for heating a house. Local organic waste can be converted to energy.

== Types ==
=== Compost heap ===
The traditional compost heater exploits the heat of a large compost heap to warm a house. This type requires a big heap, intertwined with a spiral water hose. The circulating water conducts heat to the building, where it can be fed to a heating circuit.

The heap must contain at least 8,000 liters of biomass to maintain a temperature during the winter.

For this purpose, chipped wood is usually piled up and a water hose is passed through it. A microbiological degradation process generates heat for up to 24 months. The heat produces hot water, which is then fed to a heating circuit. With sufficient oxygen supply, the biomass is degraded by aerobic decomposition. The activity of the microorganisms can be regulated by the moisture content.

=== Hot water and biogas ===
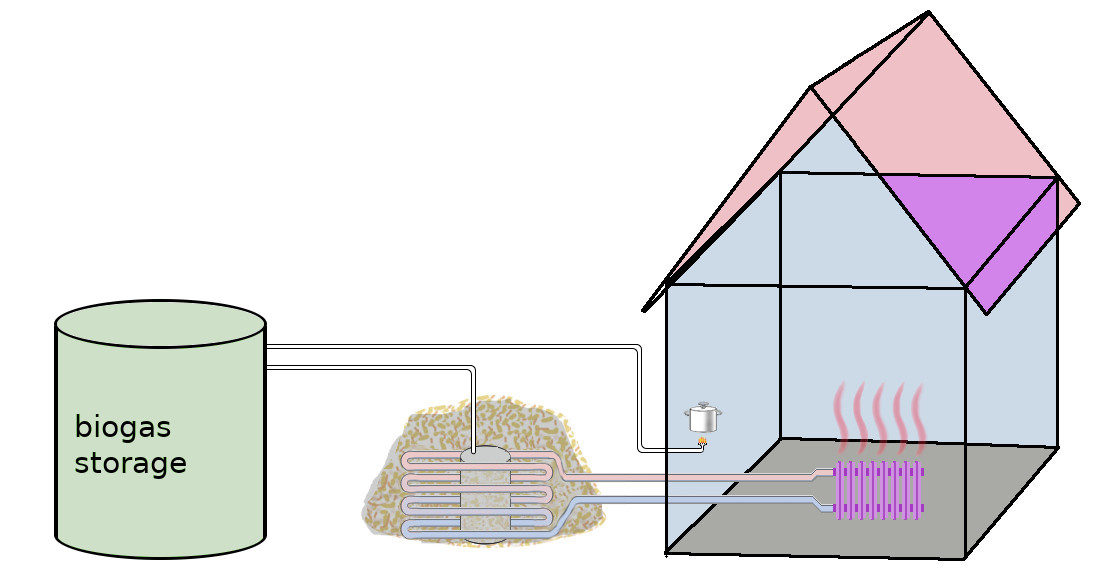
The heat of a compost heap is used, and biogas is produced at the same time

A variation of Pain's 'Biomeiler' combines composting with biogas generation.

The raw materials of Pain's compost heap were saplings, branches and underbrush. He developed machines that grind these materials to a smaller size. One of his machines, a tractor-driven model, earned fourth prize in the 1978 Grenoble Agricultural Fair.

After Pain had ground the raw materials, they would be stacked to a heap three metres high and six metres across (10 × 20 feet). The heap weighs approximately 50 tonnes (49 long tons; 55 short tons), and is mounted over a 4 cubic metres (140 cu ft) steel tank. This tank is filled to 3/4 with compost, which has previously been steeped in water for two months. The hermetically sealed tank is connected by tubing to 24 truck tire inner tubes to collect the methane gas. Pain estimates that 10 kilograms (22 pounds) of brushwood would supply the gas equivalent of one litre (0.22 imp gal; 0.26 US gal). of petrol.

It takes about 90 days to produce 500 cubic metres (18,000 cu ft) of gas: enough to keep two ovens and three burner stoves going for a year.

Pain used the gas for cooking and producing electricity. He also fueled a light van. A methane-fueled combustion engine drove a generator that produced 100 watts of electricity. This charged a battery, providing light.

Pain's compost heap generates hot water via 200 metres (656 ft) of pipe buried inside the compost mound. The pipe is wrapped around the methane generator with an inlet for cold water and an outlet for hot water. The heat from the decomposing mass produces 4 litres per minute (0.88 imp gal/min; 1.1 US gal/min) of hot water heated to 60 degrees Celsius (140 degrees Fahrenheit) — enough to meet central heating, bathroom and kitchen requirements. The heap composts for nearly 18 months, after which it is dismantled and the humus is used to mulch soils.

=== Heater silo ===
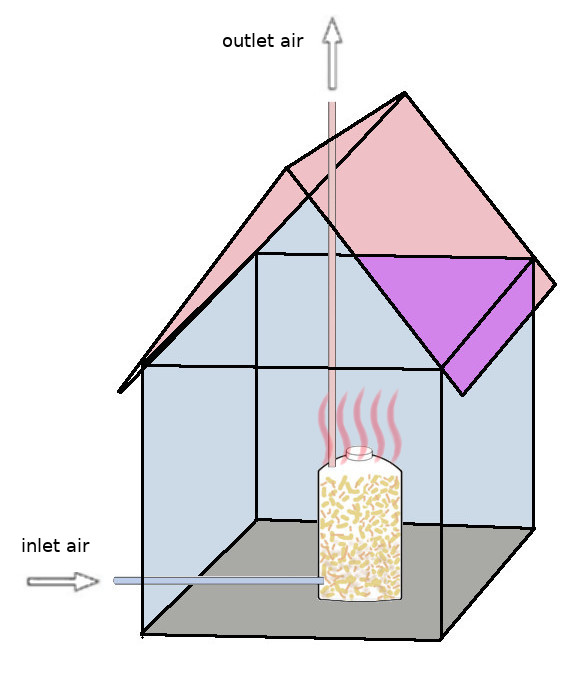
Using the heat of a compost heater silo for warming up the inside of a house

The composting process runs in an airtight container inside a house. The heat can be radiated directly to the interiors of the house or distributed by a heating circuit. An additional water pipe can be vertically built into the silo for warming water.

The silo is the central part of an in-house compost heater. In autumn the silo is filled up with fresh biomass, after which the silo delivers comfortable heat throughout the winter.

Inlet air and outlet air provide the necessary oxygen. The outlet air goes out of the house. Silo moisture is higher than in a regular compost heap. The decay process produces additional water, which is drained at the bottom of the silo. A part of this water enters the top of the silo for better distribution in the processing volume. If pumped periodically or continuously to the top to rinse through the silo, the whole system becomes a wet composting system.
