= Jean Pain =

French inventor and innovator

Jean Pain (12 December 1928 – 30 July 1981) was a Swiss-born French inventor and innovator who developed the compost heater, a compost-based bioenergy system, that produced 100% of his energy needs. He heated water to 60 °C (140 °F) at a rate of 4 litres per minute (0.88 imp gal/min; 1.1 US gal/min) which he used for washing and heating. He also distilled enough methane to run an electricity generator, cooking elements, and power his truck. This method of creating usable energy from composting materials has come to be known as "Jean Pain Composting", or the "Jean Pain Method".

== Personal life ==
Jean and his wife, Ida, lived near Domaine des Templiers, on a 241-hectare (596-acre) timber tract near the Alpes de Provence.

== Death ==
Pain died from bladder cancer in 1981, aged 52.
