= Solarwall =

Canadian brand name

SolarWall is the brand name of a transpired collector designed and manufactured by Conserval Engineering. Conserval Engineering is based in Toronto, Ontario, Canada.

== History and design ==
The SolarWall design was developed in 1989 by John Hollick of Conserval Engineering with assistance from Natural Resources Canada and the United States Department of Energy's National Renewable Energy Laboratory (NREL). The system consists of perforated metal panels mounted on a building's sun-facing exterior wall, the panels absorb heat from the sun and in turn heat the air space between the panel and the building's wall. The heated air is then pulled into the building's ventilation or HVAC system via a fan, saving building owners on their heating costs and reducing the amount of fossil fuels used. According to Mother Earth News, for every 5 square metres (54 sq ft) of SolarWall panels installed, about 1 ton of carbon dioxide emissions is displaced each year. An unglazed design is used for heating or preheating large volumes of fresh air, and a partially glazed 2-stage heater is available for achieving higher temperatures when heating buildings in colder climates. The SolarWall technology can also be installed as a hybrid solar system that generates both heat and electricity from the same surface area. By combining photovoltaics with the air heating technology, the heat produced by the solar panels is removed and drawn into the collector, helping to cool the solar panels and preheat the building's ventilation system at the same time.

Compared to traditional roof-mounted solar thermal panels designed to heat domestic hot water, a vertical orientation eliminates any snow buildup and was found to increase winter solar gain, being angled more towards the lower winter solar angle. Reflective snow on the ground was found to increase solar energy as much as 50%. SolarWall systems are typically installed without thermal storage to minimize costs and thus operate as day time heaters on commercial, industrial and institutional buildings

Three of Conserval's early SolarWall installations have been closely monitored to determine real energy savings. In 1990, Ford Motor Company installed a system on their Oakville, Ontario manufacturing plant, saving approximately 17% on their heating costs at that plant alone. The company eventually installed six more SolarWall systems on other facilities, and as of 2014 have reportedly saved more than $10 million over all their installations. In 1991, General Motors had a system installed at their Oshawa, Ontario plant and, as of 1998, reported a savings of approximately $10,200 per year. Another collector installed at NREL in Golden, Colorado in 1991 is saving about 14,310 kWh of electricity annually, a reported 25.7% decrease. According to Solar Energy Industries Association, over 5,000,000 square feet (460,000 m^{2}) of these panels were in operation as of 2015.

A new application for solar air heating is in combination with air source heat pumps where the solar heated air becomes the heat source for these units.

== Awards ==
SolarWall and its parent company Conserval have received a number of awards:

- 1994 - "R&D 100 Award" from R&D Magazine
- 1994 - "Best New Building Product of the Year Award" from Toronto Construction Association
- 1994 - "Best of What's New" Award from Popular Science
- 1997 - Federal Energy and Water Management Award from the United States Department of Energy
- 2014 - SolarWall and John Hollick honored by American Society of Mechanical Engineers as one of 80 best global inventions, inventors and engineering feats of past two centuries.

== See also ==
- Solar updraft tower
- Trombe wall
