= Solar power in Spain =

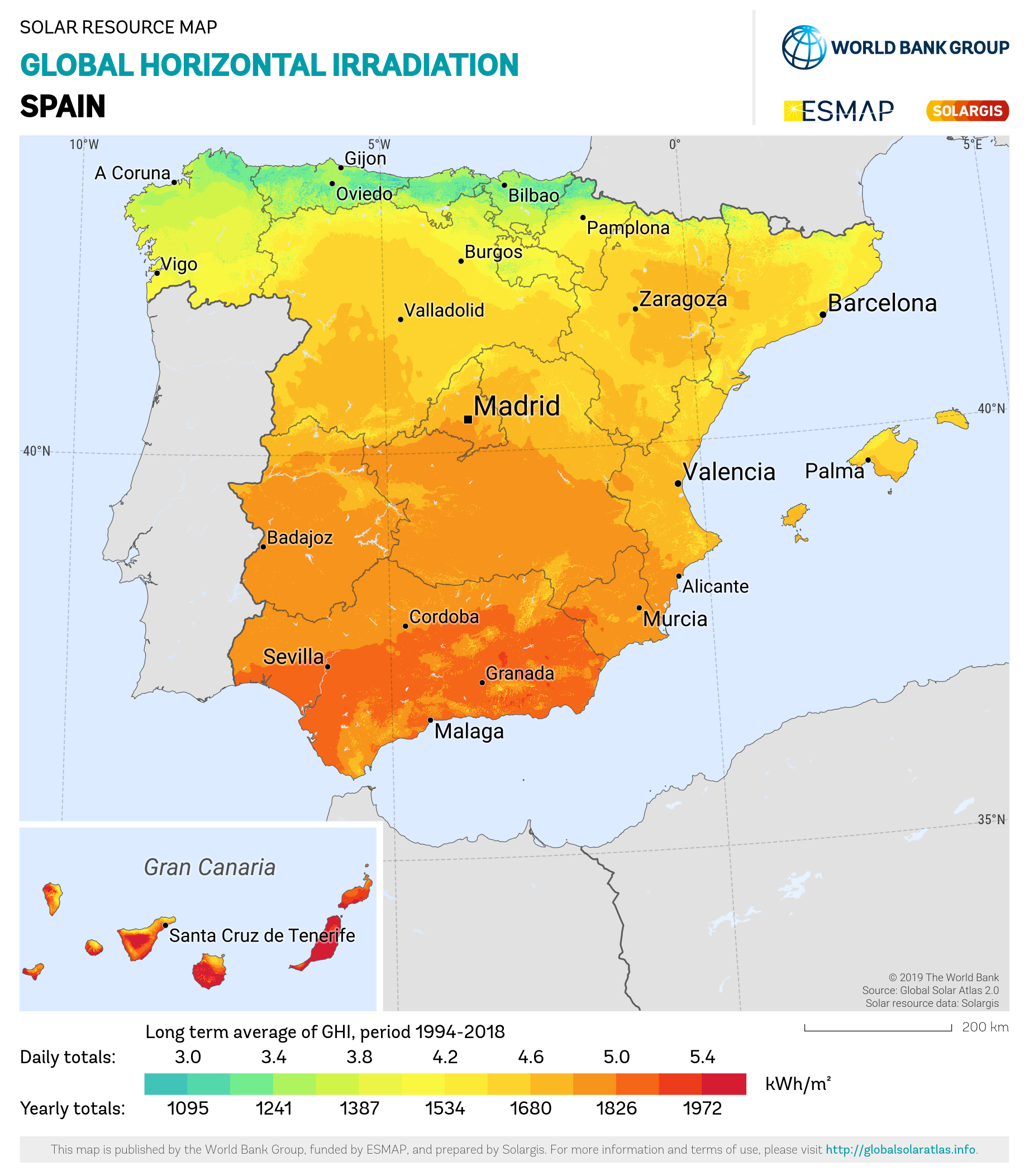
- Solar irradiation map of Spain
- Installed capacity: 38.59 GW (2024) (7th)
- Annual generation: 58.6 TWh (2024)
- Capacity per capita: 816 W (2024)
- Share of electricity: 20.9% (2024)

Spain is one of the first countries to deploy large-scale solar photovoltaics, and is the world leader in concentrated solar power (CSP) production. Spain is also one of the European countries with the most hours of sunshine. In 2022, the cumulative total solar power installed was 19.5 GW, of which 17.2 GW were solar PV installations and 2.3 GW were concentrated solar power. In the same year, solar power accounted for 11.5% of total electricity generation in the country, up from 2.4% in 2010 and less than 0.1% in 2000. Solar deployment then accelerated sharply: Spain added 5.59 GW of new solar PV in 2023 and a further 6.64 GW in 2024, bringing cumulative installed solar PV capacity to about 32 GW (32,043 MW) by the end of 2024. This made solar PV the country's largest technology by installed capacity, narrowly overtaking wind (32,007 MW). Solar PV's share of total electricity generation continued to rise, reaching about 17% in 2024, up from 11.5% in 2022, although wind remained the single largest source of generation. Industry organization Solar Power Europe projects Spain will more than double its solar PV capacity between 2022 and 2026.

The country initially had a leading role in the development of solar power. Generous prices for grid connected solar power were offered to encourage the industry. The boom in solar power installations were faster than anticipated and prices for grid connected solar power were not cut to reflect this, leading to a fast but unsustainable boom in installations. Spain would find itself second only to Germany in the world for solar power installed capacity. In the wake of the 2008 financial crisis, the Spanish government drastically cut its subsidies for solar power and capped future increases in capacity at 500 MW per year, with effects upon the industry worldwide. Between 2012 and 2016, new installations stagnated in Spain while growth accelerated in other leading countries leaving Spain to lose much of its world leading status to countries such as Germany, China and Japan. The controversial "sun tax" and intimidating regulation surrounding solar self consumption introduced in 2015 were only begun to be repealed in late 2018 by the new government. As a legacy from Spain's earlier development of solar power, the country remains a world leader in concentrated solar power. Many large concentrated solar power stations remain active in Spain and may have provided some of the impetus for large CSP developments in neighbouring Morocco.

The 2020s are seeing a large increase in solar installations in Spain. Following three years of strong growth, the country's updated 2023 National Energy and Climate Plan anticipates solar PV capacity reaching 76 GW by 2030.

== Installed capacity ==
Installed capacity (MW) Solar PV Solar thermal

Installed capacity grew rapidly until 2013. Between 2013 and 2018 growth was negligible in Spain, and the country fell behind many other European countries in the development of capacity, though it retained its leading position in the deployment of solar thermal power. Growth resumed again after 2018.

Installed solar generation capacity (MW)
	2006	2007	2008	2009	2010	2011	2012	2013	2014	2015	2016	2017	2018	2019	2020	2021	2022
Solar PV*	125	637	3,355	3,399	3,840	4,261	4,561	4,639	4,646	4,656	4,669	4,688	4,707	8,711	11,669	15,286	18,164
Solar thermal	11	11	61	232	532	999	1,950	2,304	2,304	2,304	2,304	2,304	2,304	2,304			
Total	136	648	3,416	3,631	4,372	5,260	6,511	6,943	6,950	6,960	6,973	6,992	7,011	11,015			
_{*Solar PV figures include only grid-connected capacity.}

== Timeline of developments ==
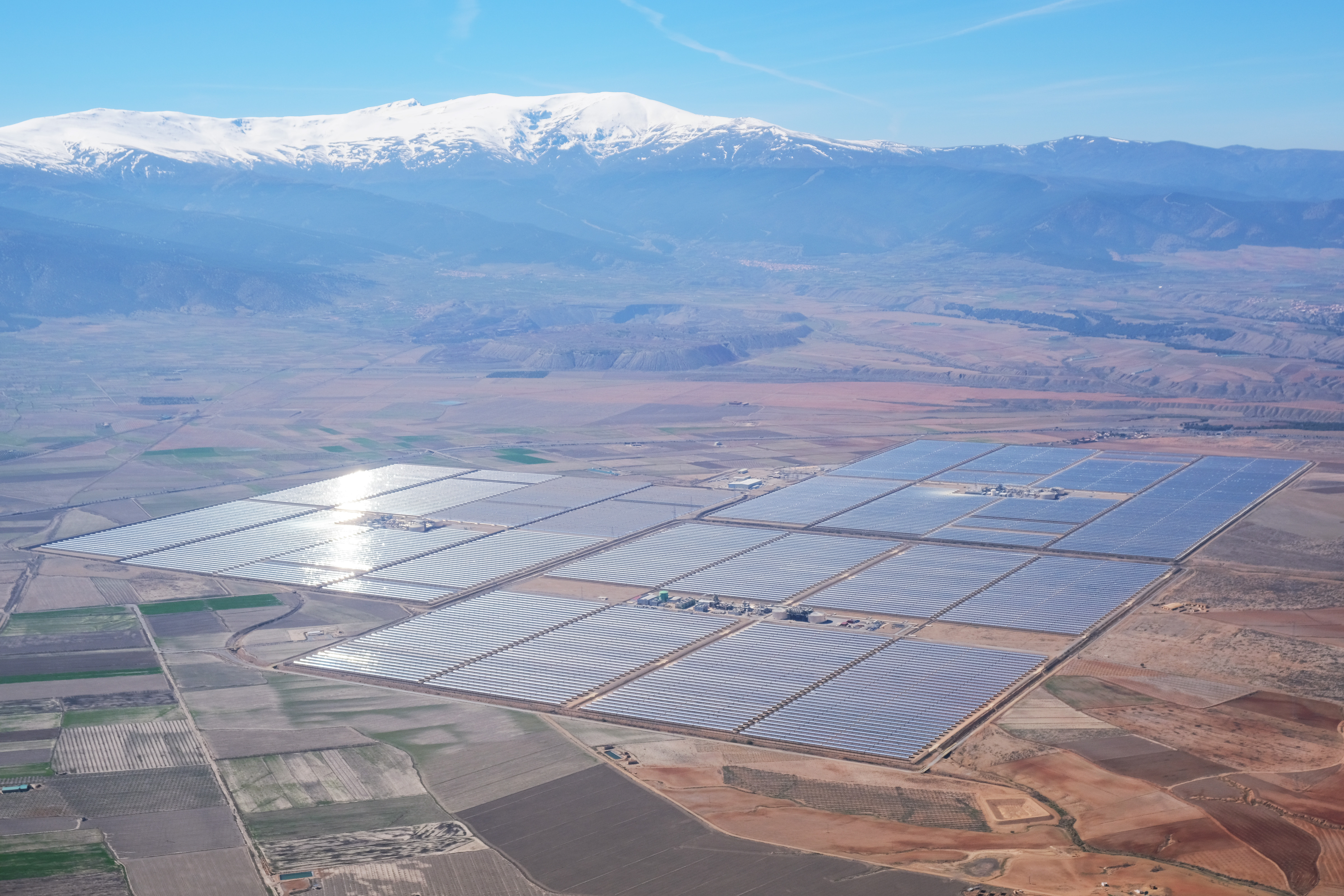
The 150 MW Andasol solar power station is a commercial parabolic trough solar thermal power plant, located in Spain. The plant uses tanks of molten salt to store solar energy so that it can continue generating electricity even when the sun isn not shining.

=== 2004 ===
Through a ministerial ruling in March 2004, the Spanish government removed economic barriers to the connection of renewable energy technologies to the electricity grid. The Royal Decree 436/2004 equalised conditions for large-scale solar thermal and photovoltaic plants and guaranteed feed-in tariffs.

=== 2008 ===
Spain added a record 2.6 GW of solar photovoltaic power in 2008, a figure almost five times that of the next record year, increasing capacity to 3.5 GW. Spain surpassed both Japan and the United States in 2008 as the number two market as measured by cumulative installed PV capacity behind the world leader at the time Germany, accounting for 24% of global PV capacity. PV capacity added during 2008 would still account for more than half of total capacity as of 2016. In 2008 the Spanish government committed to achieving a target of 12% of primary energy from renewable energy by 2010 and by 2020 expected the installed solar generating capacity of 10 GW.

=== 2010–2011 ===
Since 2010, Spain has been the world's leader in concentrated solar power (CSP). Spain was leapfrogged by Italy during 2011 following a later solar boom there to lose its position as the world's second largest installer of solar PV.

=== 2012 ===
By the end of 2012, 4.5 GW of solar photovoltaics had been installed, and in that year 8.2 TWh of electricity was produced. New installations of solar photovoltaics have slowed down significantly to around 300 MW during 2012. By the end of 2012 Spain had also installed over 2,000 MW of CSP.

=== 2014–2016 ===
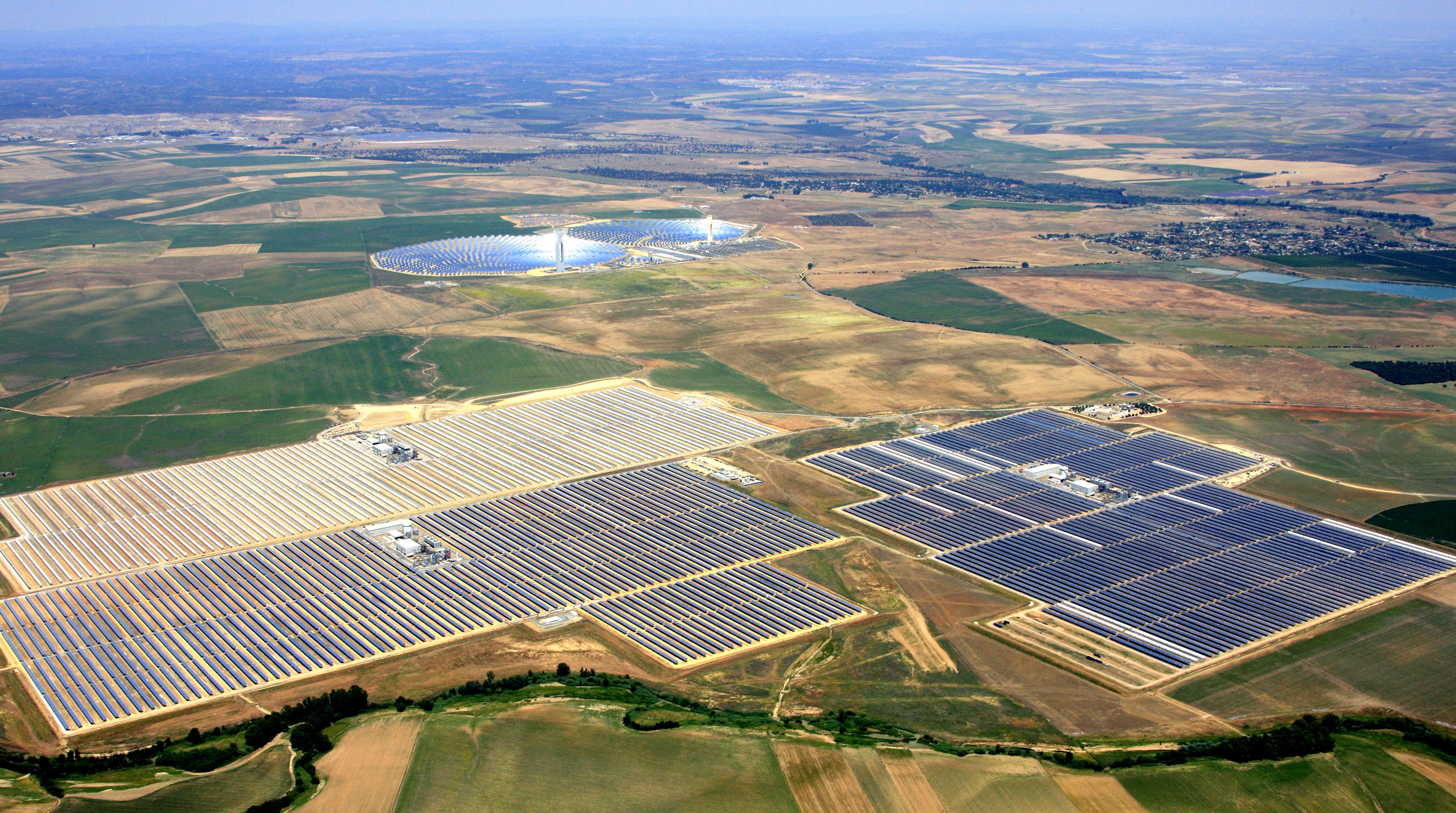
The first three units of Solnova in the foreground, with the two towers of the PS10 and PS20 solar power stations in the background.

Almost no new solar capacity was added between 2014 and 2016, following the removal of government feed-in tariffs. Having promoted the solar industry with large government subsidies during earlier periods, the system now operates under a 180-degree turn with a punitive 'sun tax' applied to new PV systems which would otherwise flourish. Spain has been cited as a model in how not to develop renewables. The hoped for growth in self consumption solar generation during 2016 fails to materialise due to delays to reforms following the extended time taken to form a government, albeit with just one party opposed to reforms in this area.

=== 2017 ===
In May 2017, Spain held an auction for new renewable capacity to be online by 2020. Solar projects won only 1 MW of the 3000 MW awarded. After complaints by the solar industry which felt the auction terms favoured wind power, another auction occurred in July. In this auction, solar projects received 3,909 MW and wind received 1,128 MW. Financing, land acquisition and solar panel price fluctuations could reduce the actual amount of solar power installed.

=== 2018 ===
A new sector of the market begins to make headway in the Spanish market following the easing of regulations on self consumption generation. 261.7 MW of new solar power was installed, of which just 26 MW were connected to the grid and the remainder, 235.7 MW being self-generating installations. It is expected that this could increase to 300 to 400 MW per year following further easing of regulations in May 2018. Renewable energy auctions held in the previous year have yet to show much impact on grid connected capacity but expected to make a considerable change during 2019. According to industry sources the 3.9 GW tendered through government auctions has been dwarfed by huge merchant and power purchase agreements bringing the combined total under consideration to 29 GW. The re-emerging boom in Spanish solar PV is not being driven by subsidies or government tenders but as a result of solar being a highly cost effective proposition for electricity needs.

=== 2023 ===
Spain is poised to become a major contributor to Europe's renewable energy landscape, supported by its robust solar potential and favorable market conditions. In 2023, Spain is on track to increase its solar capacity by 4 GW. The country also has ambitions to install an additional 19 GW of new capacity between 2022 and 2025, which would make it home to the largest solar pipeline in Europe. However, Spain grapples with lengthy permitting processes, which can take up to five years, posing a significant hurdle to project development. To address this challenge, the government introduced new regulations in March 2023, streamlining permitting for projects below 150 MW capacity and with low or medium environmental impact. These measures aim to reduce permitting times to approximately two years.

== Solar thermal power plants ==
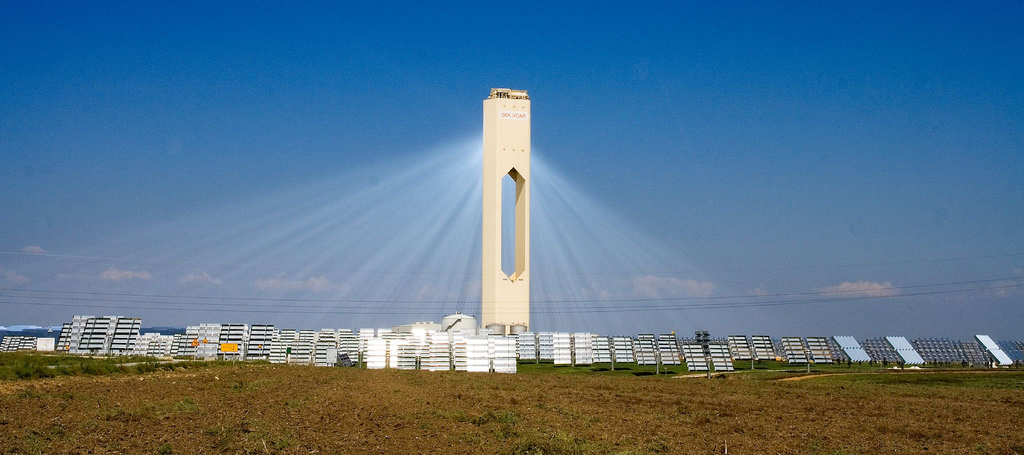
The 11 megawatt PS10 solar power tower produces electricity from the sun using 624 large movable mirrors called heliostats.

Concentrated solar power (CSP) plants list
Name of plant	Net power MW(e)	GW·h /year	Capacity factor	Completed
PS10	10	23.4	0.24	2007
Andasol 1	50	165	0.41	2008
PS20	20	48	0.27	2009
Eureka	2			2009, June
Andasol 2	50			2009
Puerto Errado 1	1.5			2009
Puertollano	50			2009
La Risca	50			2009
Extresol 1	50			2010
Extresol 2	50			2010
La Florida	50			2010, July
Majadas	50			2010, August
Solnova 1	50			2010
Solnova 3	50			2010
Alvarado I	50			2010
Solnova 4	50			2010
La Dehesa	50			2010, November
Palma del Rio 2	50			2011
Manchasol 1	50			2011
Manchasol 2	50			2011
Gemasolar	20			2011
Palma del Rio 1	50			2011
Lebrija 1	50			2011
Andasol 3	50			2011
Helioenergy 1	50			2011
Astexol 3	50			2011
Arcosol 50	50			2011
Termosol 50	50			2011
Helioenergy 2	50			2012
Valle 1	50	170		2012
Valle 2	50	170		2012
Puerto Errado 2	30			2012
Aste 1A	50			2012
Aste 1B	50			2012
Moron	50			2012
Helios 1	50			2012, May
Solaben 3	50			2012, June
Guzman	50			2012, July
La Africana	50			2012, July
Olivenza 1	50			2012, July
Helios 2	50			2012, August
Extresol 3	50			2012, August
Orellana	50			2012, August
Solaben 2	50			2012, October
Solarcor 1	50			2012
Solarcor 2	50			2012
Termosolar Borges	25			2012, December

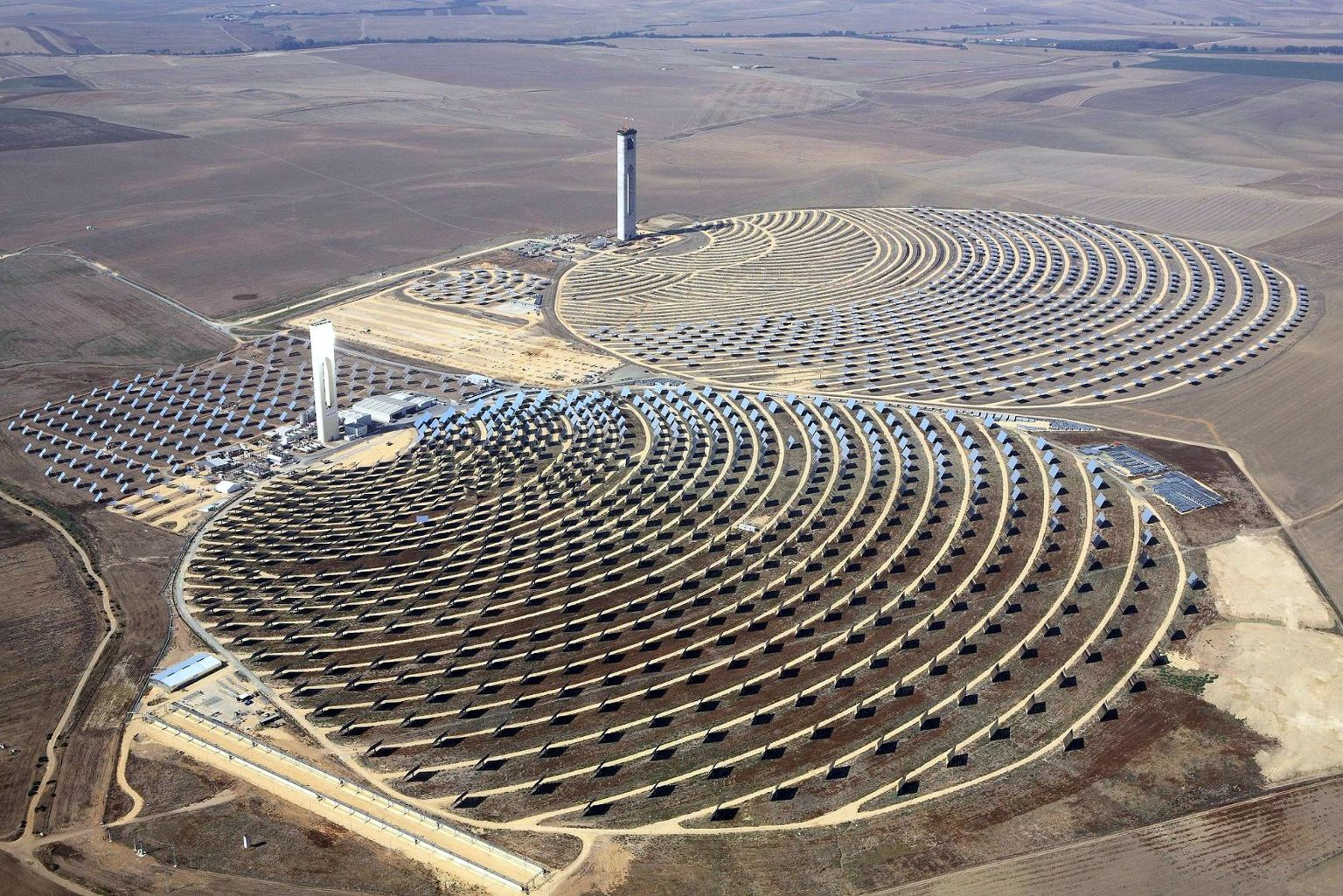
Solar towers from left: PS10, PS20

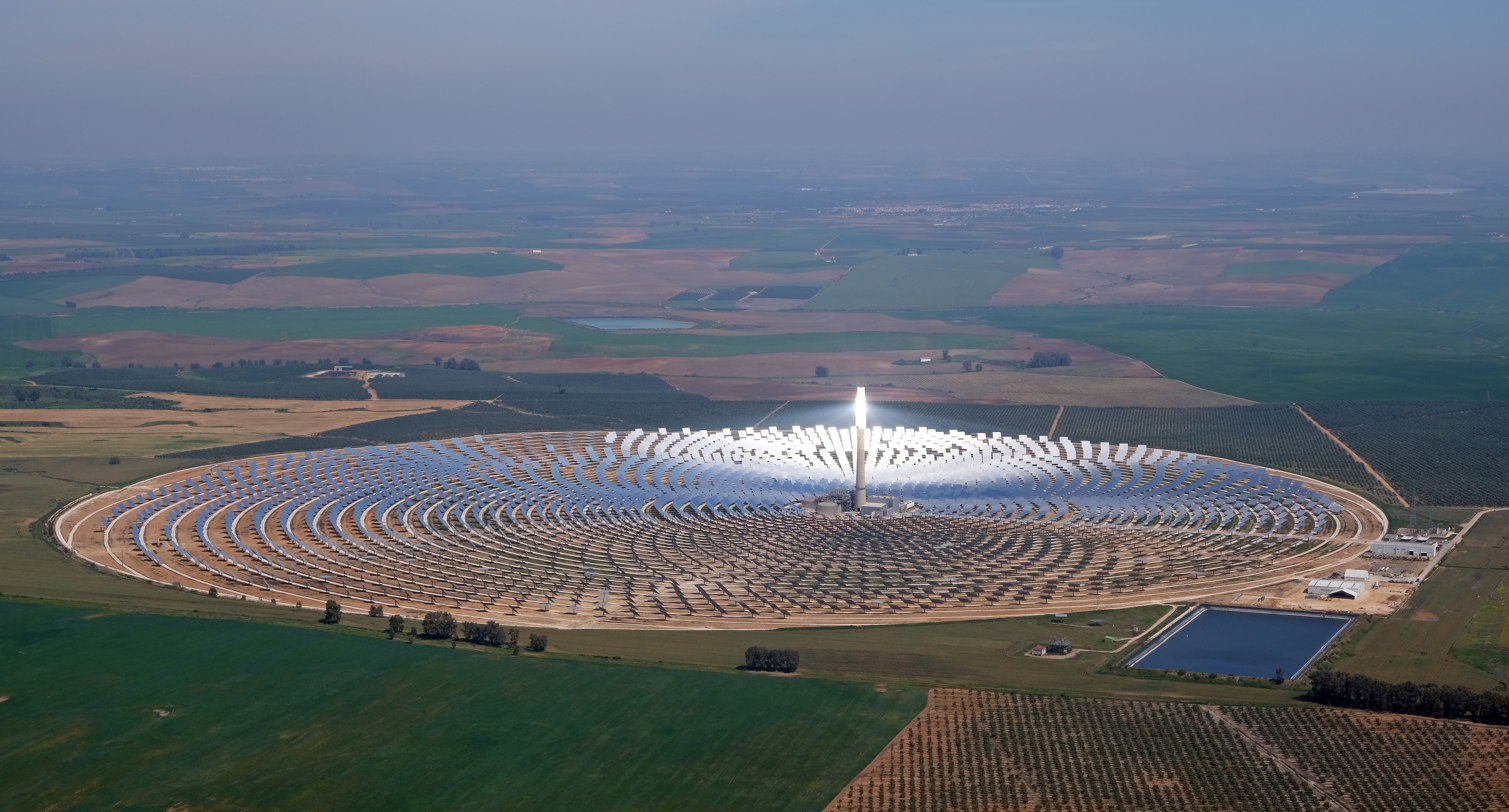
Gemasolar Thermosolar Plant was the first concentrated solar power plant to provide 24‑hour power.

In March 2007, Europe's first commercial concentrating solar power tower plant was opened near the sunny Andalusian city of Seville. The 11 MW plant, known as the PS10 solar power tower, produces electricity with 624 large heliostats. Each of these mirrors has a surface measuring 120 square meters (1,290 square feet) that concentrates the Sun's rays to the top of a 115-meter (377 feet) high tower where a solar receiver and a steam turbine are located. The turbine drives a generator, producing electricity.

The Andasol 1 solar power station is Europe's first parabolic trough commercial power plant (50 MWe), located near Guadix in the province of Granada, also in Andalusia (the plant is named after the region). The Andasol 1 power plant went online in November 2008, and has a thermal storage system which absorbs part of the heat produced in the solar field during the day. This heat is then stored in a molten salt mixture and used to generate electricity during the night, or when the sky is overcast.

A 15 MWe solar-only power tower plant, the Solar Tres project, is in the hands of the Spanish company SENER, employing molten salt technologies for receiving and energy storage. Its 16-hour molten salt storage system will be able to deliver power around the clock. The Solar Tres project has received a €5 million grant from the EC's Fifth Framework Programme.

Solar thermal power plants designed for solar-only generation are well matched to summer noon peak loads in prosperous areas with significant cooling demands, such as Spain. Using thermal energy storage systems, solar thermal operating periods can even be extended to meet base-load needs.

Abengoa Solar began commercial operation of a 20-megawatt solar power tower plant near Seville in late April 2009. Called the PS20, the plant uses a field of 1,255 flat mirrors, or heliostats, to concentrate sunlight on a receiver mounted on a central tower. Water pumped up the tower and through the receiver boils into steam, which is then directed through a turbine to produce electricity. The new facility is located adjacent to one with half its capacity, called PS10, which was the world's first commercial solar power tower plant. According to Abengoa Solar, the new facility is exceeding its predicted power output.

== Photovoltaics ==
=== Solar PV market segmentation ===
Installed PV capacity in Spain by class size in 2017
<10 kW	2%
10-100 kW	27%
100-500 kW	43%
>500 kW	28%

Utility scale solar PV dominated the cumulative installed capacity in 2018 accounting for over 75% of the total in Spain although some sources would not define smaller sized installations as utility scale. Only 2% of Spain's installations in 2017 were in the size typical for residential rooftop solar. This is typically the situation in European countries which had a short-term generous feed in their tariff system with little attention to policy consistency and scale of installations. As of 2018, 19% of Europe's cumulative PV capacity was installed on residential rooftops, and about 30% on commercial roofs, while the industrial segment accounted for 17%, and the utility market for 34%.

The government projects an increase in solar PV capacity by approximately 30 GW, rising from 9 GW in 2020 to 21.7 GW by 2025, and reaching 39.2 GW by 2030.

==== Residential solar PV capacity ====
According to a report on behalf of the European Commission Spain had just 49 MW of residential solar PV capacity with just 12,000 residential solar PV prosumers in the country representing only 0.1% of households as of 2015. The average size of residential solar PV installations in Spain moving forwards to 2030 is 3.94 kW. The technical potential for residential solar PV in Spain is estimated at 13,620 MW. The United Kingdom, a relative latecomer to Solar PV development, had 2,499 MW of residential solar PV installed as of 2015. At the end of 2023, Spain had 2,400 MW of residential solar PV, most of it tied to the grid.

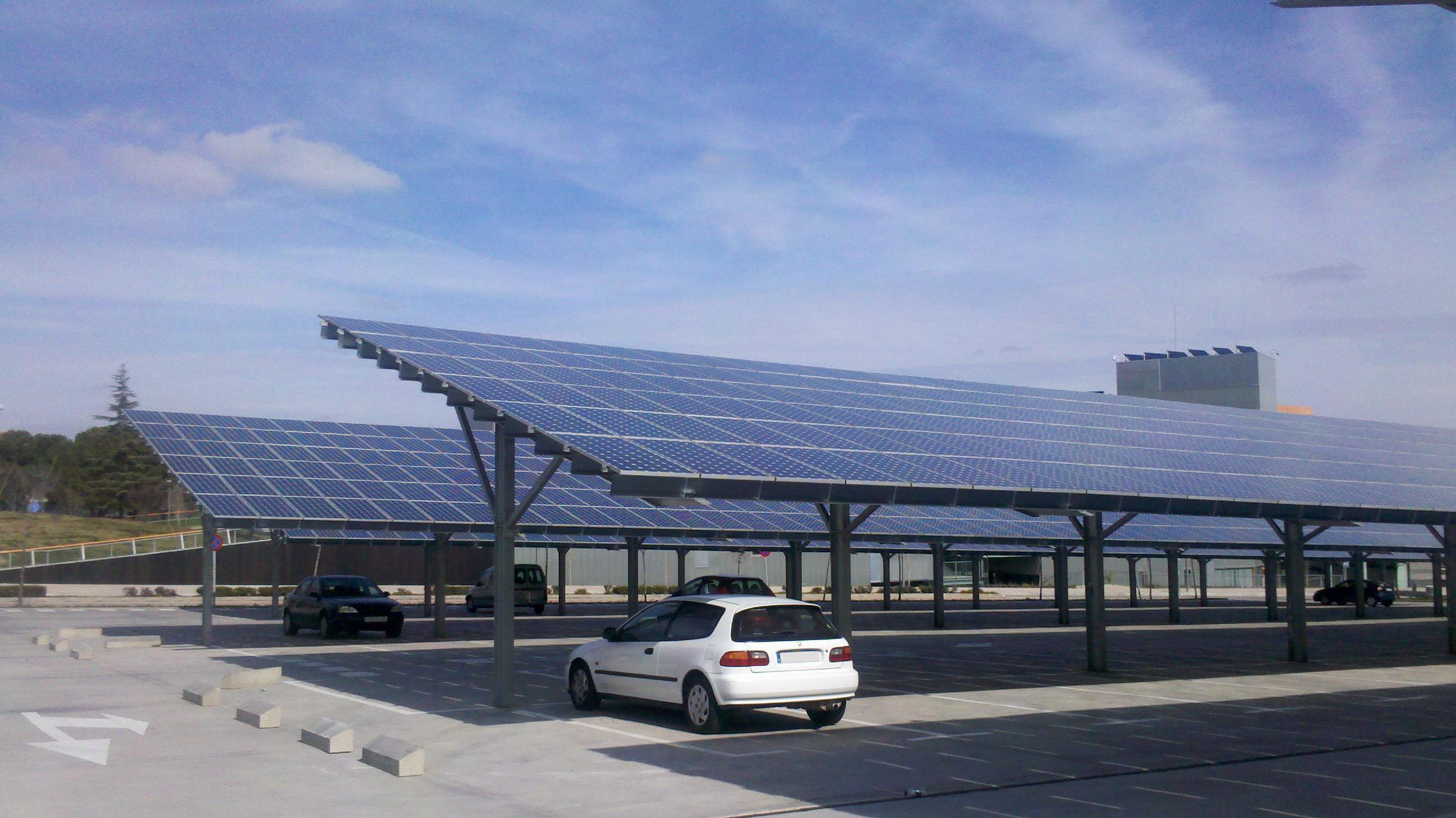
PV solar parking lot in Madrid

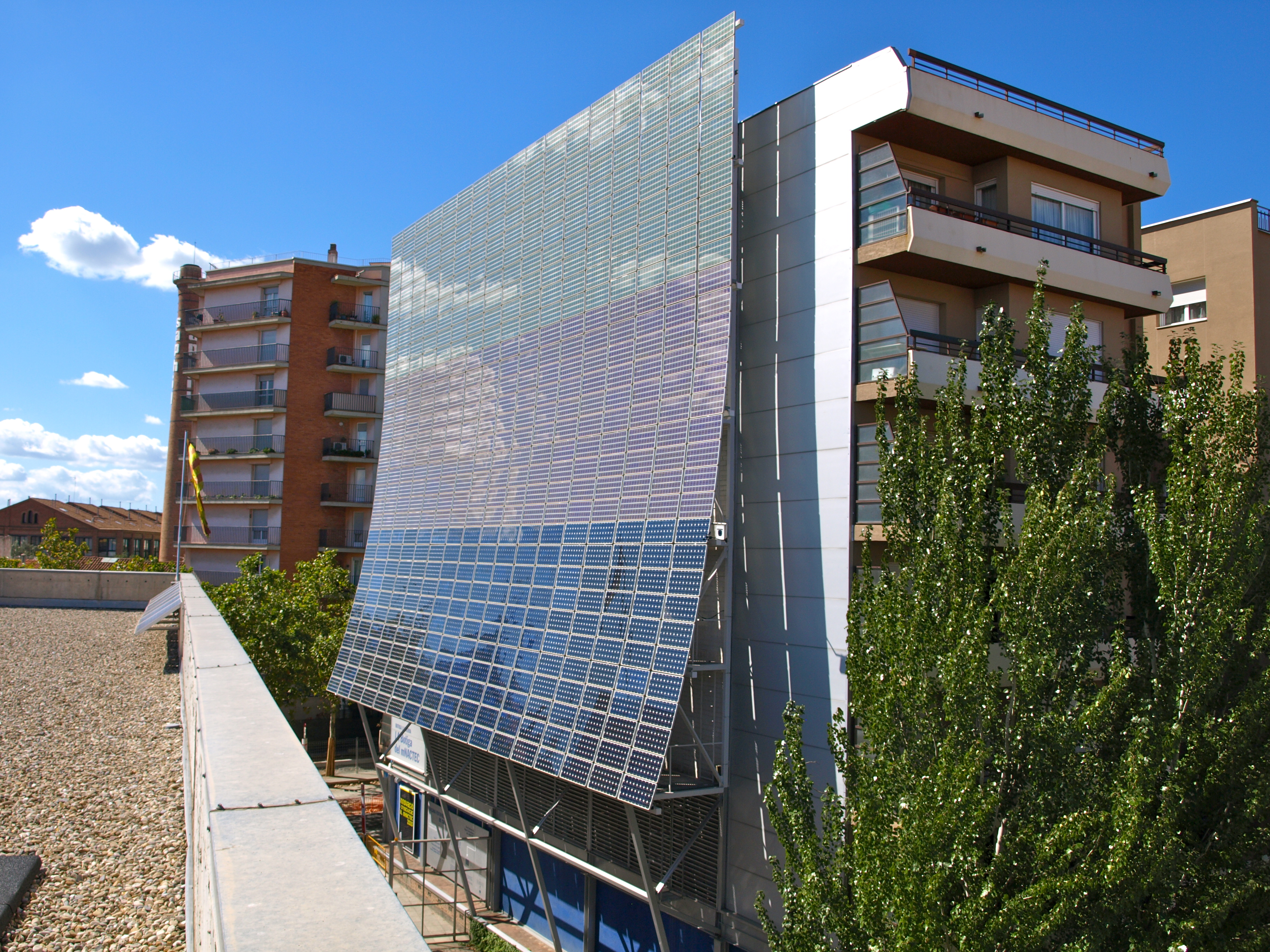
BIPV façade at MNACTEC, near Barcelona

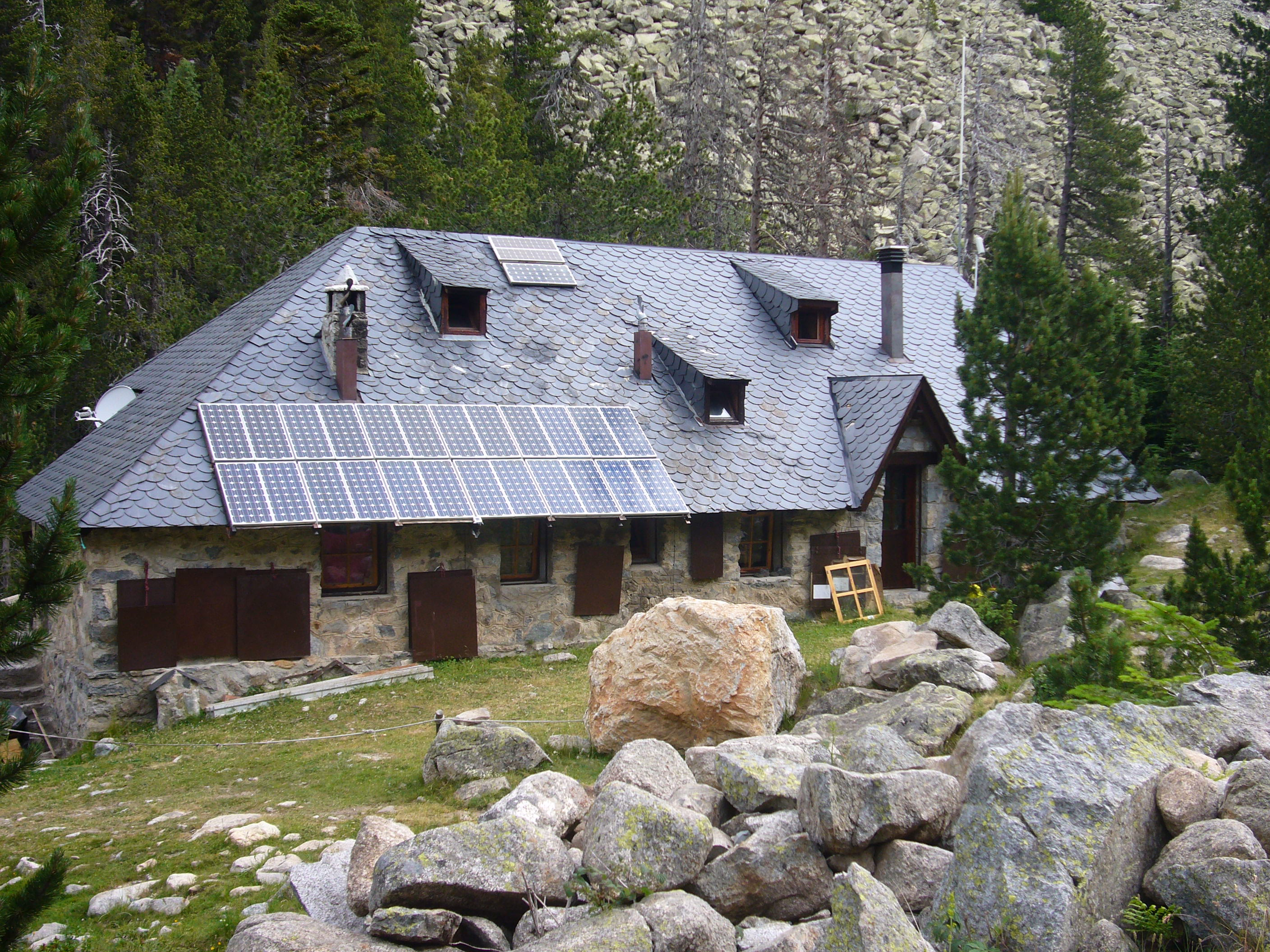
An isolated mountain hut with stand-alone PV system in Catalonia

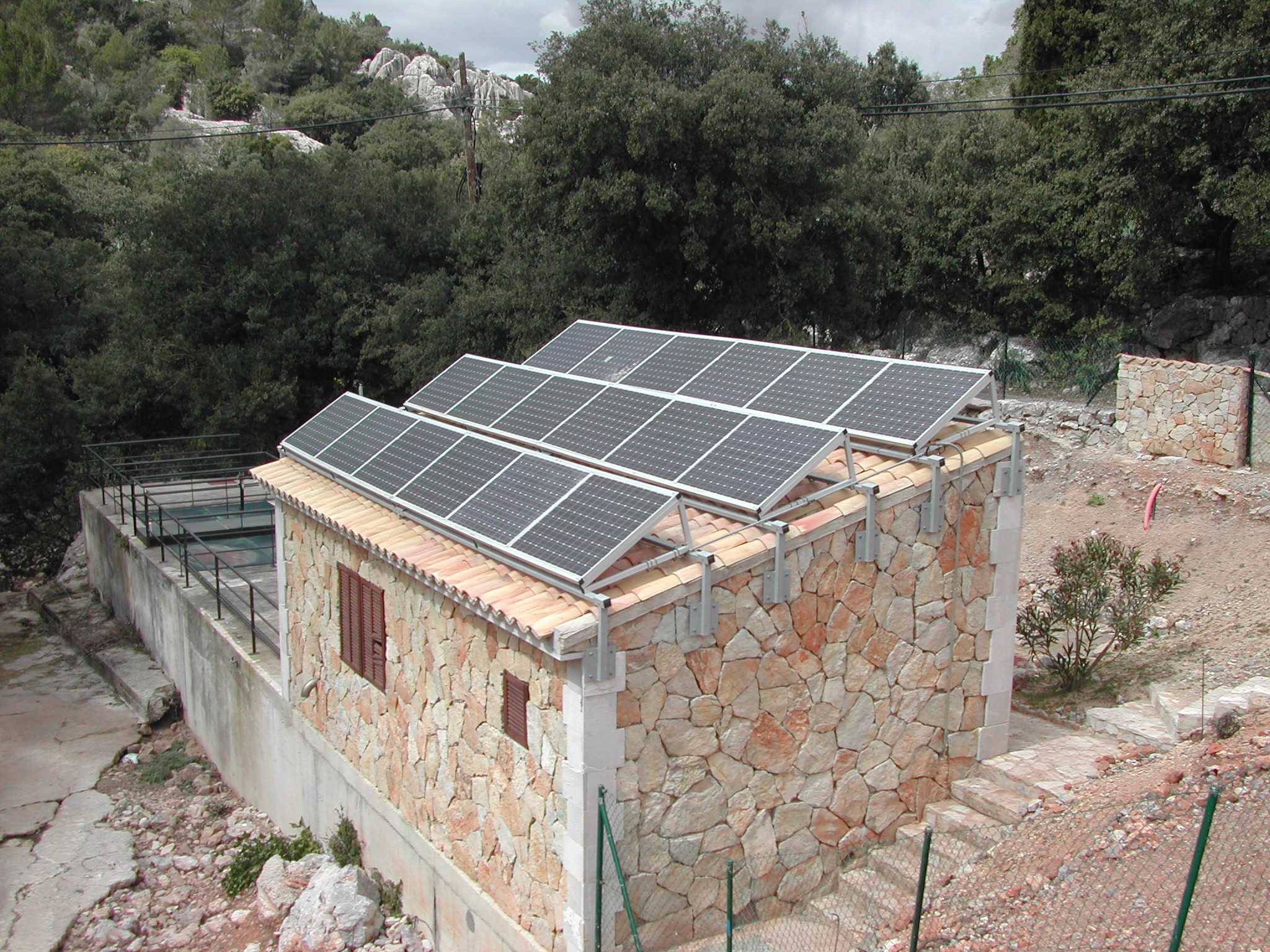
solar PV system at a sewage treatment plant in Santuari de Lluc (Mallorca)

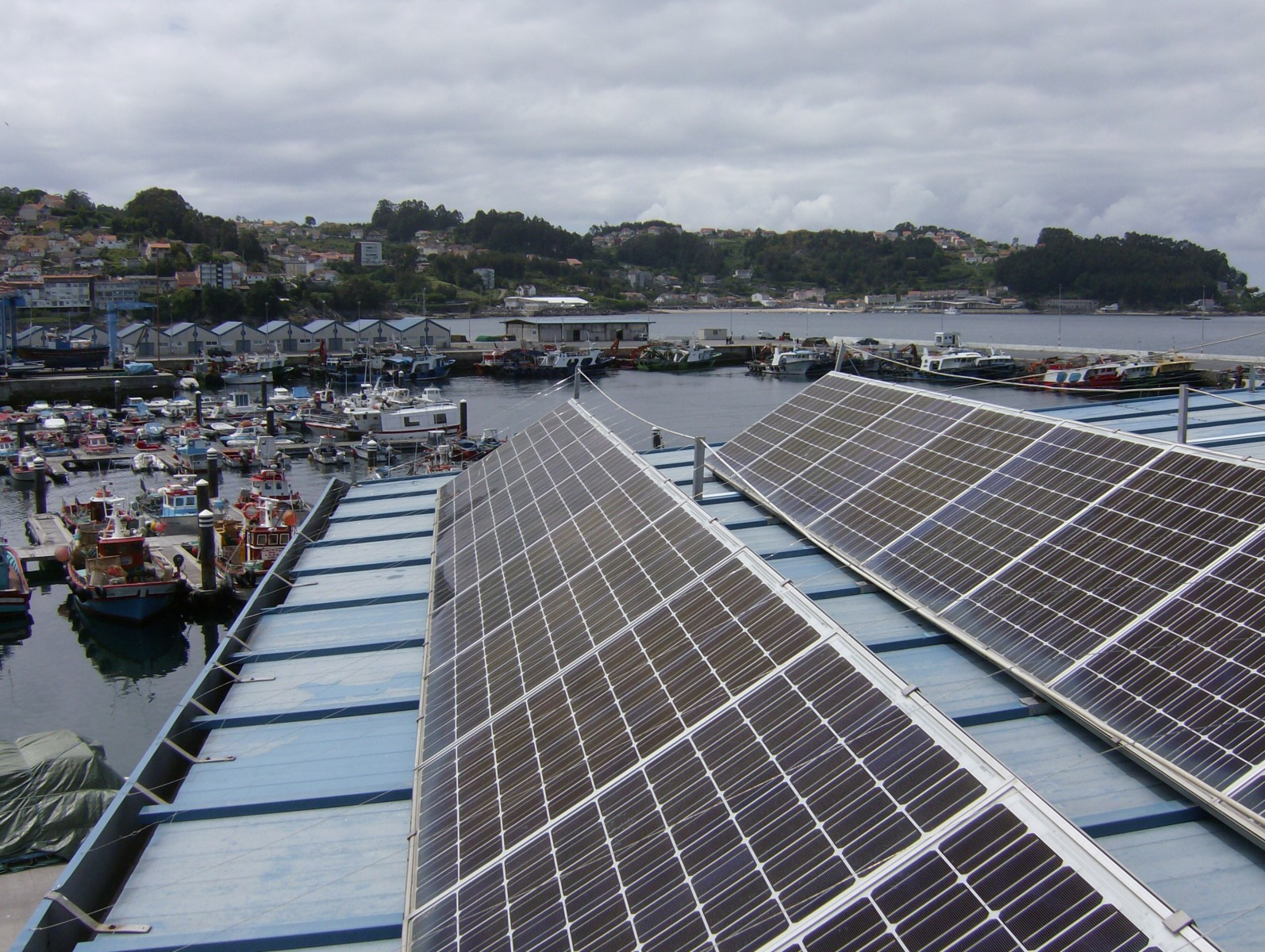
solar PV system at a port warehouse in Galicia

==== Large PV roofs ====
Selected large photovoltaic roofs in Spain
Location	Organisation (linked)	Online	Capacity (MW)
Figueruelas	GM facility	2008	11.8
Martorell	Seat al Sol, SEAT facility	2010–2013	11.0
Castala	Actiu Technology Park	2008	5.2

At the time of opening, the General Motors facility at Figueruelas was the world's largest photovoltaic (PV) roof, consisting of 85,000 lightweight panels, thereby reducing annual carbon dioxide emissions by 6,700 tonnes per year. GM planned to install solar panels at eleven other plants across Europe.

==== Utility-scale systems ====
Spain's largest photovoltaic (PV) power plants
Name of plant	DC peak power (MW)	GW·h/year	Capacity factor	Notes
Núñez de Balboa Photovoltaic Power Plant	500			Commissioned April 2020
Mula Photovoltaic Power Plant	494			Completed July 2019
Olmedilla Photovoltaic Park	60	85	0.16	Completed September 2008
Puertollano Photovoltaic Park	47			2008
Planta Solar La Magascona & La Magasquila	34.5			
Planta Solar Dulcinea	31.8			Completed 2009
Merida/Don Alvaro Solar Park	30			Completed September 2008
Planta Solar Ose de la Vega	30			
Arnedo Solar Plant	30			Completed October 2008
Merida/Don Alvaro Solar Park	30			Completed September 2008
Planta Fotovoltaico Casas de Los Pinos	28			
Planta solar Fuente Álamo	26	44	0.19	
Planta fotovoltaica de Lucainena de las Torres	23.2			Completed August 2008
Parque Fotovoltaico Abertura Solar	23.1	47	0.23	
Parque Solar Hoya de Los Vicentes	23	41	0.20	
Huerta Solar Almaraz	22.1			Completed September 2008
Parque Solar El Coronil 1	21.4			
Solarpark Calveron	21.2	40	0.22	
El Bonillo Solar Park	20			Completed October 2008
Huerta Solar Almaraz	20			Completed September 2008
Granadilla de Abona Photovoltaic Park	20			Completed 2008
Planta solar fotovoltaico Calasparra	20			
Planta Solar La Magascona	20	42	0.24	
Beneixama photovoltaic power plant	20	30	0.17	Tenesol, Aleo, and Solon SE solar modules with Q-Cells
Planta de energía solar Mahora	15			Completed September 2008
Planta Solar de Salamanca	13.8	n.a.		70,000 Kyocera panels
Parque Solar Guadarranque	13.6	20	0.17	
Lobosillo Solar Park	12.7	n.a.		Chaori and YingLi modules
Parque Solar Fotovoltaico Villafranca	12			High concentration PV technology
Monte Alto photovoltaic power plant	9.5	14	0.17	
Viana Solar Park	8.7	11	0.14	

Photovoltaics (PV) convert sunlight into electricity and many solar photovoltaic power stations have been built in Spain. As of November 2010, the largest PV power plants in Spain include the Olmedilla Photovoltaic Park (60 MW), Puertollano Photovoltaic Park (47.6 MW), Planta Solar La Magascona & La Magasquila (34.5 MW), Arnedo Solar Plant (34 MW), and Planta Solar Dulcinea (31.8 MW).

BP Solar begun constructing a new solar photovoltaic cell manufacturing plant at its European headquarters in Tres Cantos, Madrid. For phase one of the Madrid expansion, BP Solar aimed to expand its annual cell capacity from 55 MW to around 300 MW. Construction of this facility was underway, with the first manufacturing line expected to be fully operational in 2009. The new cell lines would use innovative screen-printing technology. By fully automating wafer handling, the manufacturing lines would be able to handle the very thinnest of wafers available and ensure the highest quality. Thin wafers are of particular importance since there has been a silicon shortage in recent years. However, after the new national law limiting installed power by year, in April 2009 BP Solar closed its factories.

Since the beginning of 2007, Aleo Solar AG has also been manufacturing high-quality solar modules for the Spanish market at its own factory in Santa Maria de Palautordera near Barcelona. In 2014 SITECNO S.A. took over this facility

=== Regional PV distribution ===
PV capacity in watts per capita by autonomous communities in 2013: <1 watt 1—10 watts 10—50 watts 50—100 watts 100—200 watts / 200—350 watts 350—500 watts 500—750 watts >750 watts

Installed PV capacity in megawatts
Autonomous communities	2010	2011	2022	Watts per capita (2022)
Andalusia	765	822	4,163	488
Aragon	142	146	1,851	1,408
Asturias	1	1	1	
Balearic Islands	60	66	225	183
Basque Country	20	23	51	23
Canary Islands	133	138	212	94
Cantabria	2	2	4	6
Castile-La Mancha	897	923	4,048	1,974
Castile and León	410	467	1,438	605
Catalonia	202	234	295	38
Ceuta and Melilla	0.1	0.1		
Community of Madrid	38	48	63	9
Extremadura	492	558	5,347	5,076
Galicia	10	12	18	6
La Rioja	83	89	99	313
Navarre	142	155	166	251
Region of Murcia	357	404	1,384	908
Valencian Community	277	313	419	82

== Policies, laws and incentives ==
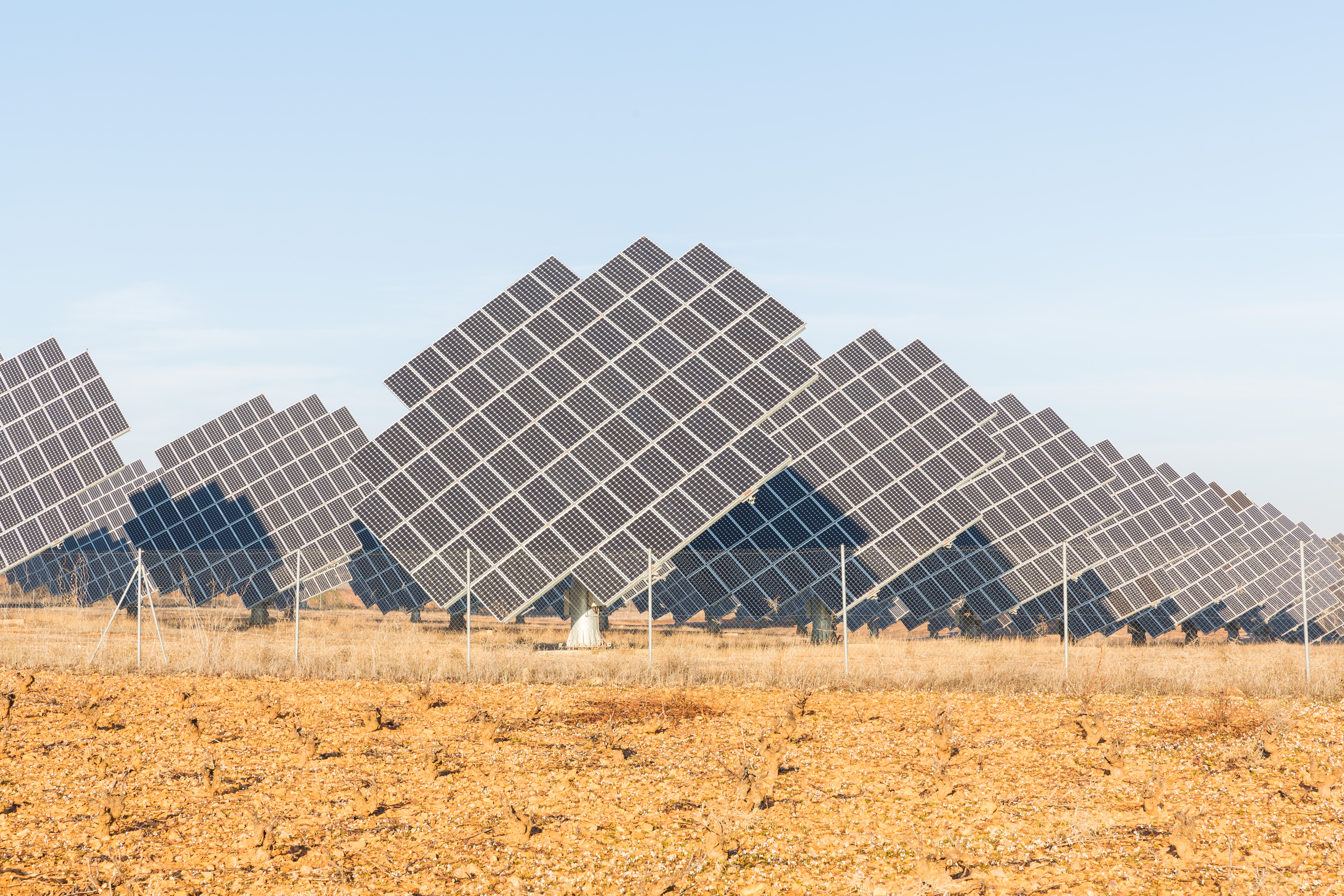
Solar panels in Cariñena, Aragon

=== New technical building code ===
In 2006, Spain implemented a regulatory instrument of national jurisdiction promulgated by the Royal Decree 314/2006 referred to as the technical building code (TBC or CTE in Spanish) to regulate the basic quality requirements of buildings and their respective installations concerning thermal and photovoltaic solar energy. It applies to new constructions as well as any modifications made on any existing building with the final goal to guarantee and promote the use of renewable sources of energy.

Concerning thermosolar energy, Spain was the first country in Europe to enforce the integration of solar thermal systems in new constructed or refurnished buildings to cover from 30 to 70% of the Domestic Hot Water (DHW) demand. Article 15.4 of the TBC states that "buildings with foreseen demand for hot water or the conditioning of a covered swimming pool, part of the thermal energy needs shall be covered by incorporating systems for the collection, storage and use of low temperature solar energy".

In relation to Photovoltaic power, Article 15.5 requires the incorporation of "systems for the collection and transformation of solar energy into electric power by photovoltaic processes for proprietary use or supply to the network". This policy triggered the production of this type of renewable energy positioning Spain on top of the largest producers of photovoltaic electricity in the world by 2009.

=== Subsidy reductions ===
In the wake of the 2008 financial crisis, the Spanish government drastically cut its subsidies for solar power and capped future increases in capacity at 500 MW per year, with effects upon the industry worldwide. "The solar industry in 2009 has been undermined by [a] collapse in demand due to the decision by Spain", according to Henning Wicht, a solar-power analyst. In 2010, the Spanish government went further, retroactively cutting subsidies for existing solar projects, aiming to save several billion euro it owed. According to the Photovoltaic Industry Association, several hundred photovoltaic plant operators may face bankruptcy. Phil Dominy of Ernst & Young, comparing the feed-in tariff reductions in Germany and Italy, said, "Spain stands out as an example of how not to do it". As a result, a Spanish association of solar power producers has announced its intention to go to court over the government's plans to cap solar subsidies. In 2014 alternative energy group NextEra filed a complaint against Spain at the International Centre for Settlement of Investment Disputes.

== Research and development ==
The Plataforma Solar de Almería (PSA), part of the Center for Energy, Environment and Technological Research (CIEMAT), is a center for research, development, and testing of concentrating solar power technologies. ISFOC in Puertollano is a development institute for concentrator photovoltaics (CPV) which evaluates CPV technologies at the pilot production scale to optimise operation and determine cost. Technical University of Madrid has a photovoltaic research group.

Solar Concentra is the Spanish technology platform for concentrated solar power (CSP). It was created in 2010, and it combines the efforts of the different agents of the CSP sector in Spain.

== See also ==
- Growth of photovoltaics
- List of renewable energy topics by country
- Renewable energy in Spain
- Solar energy in the European Union
