= Sevilla Photovoltaic Power Plant =

Photovoltaic power stations in Spain

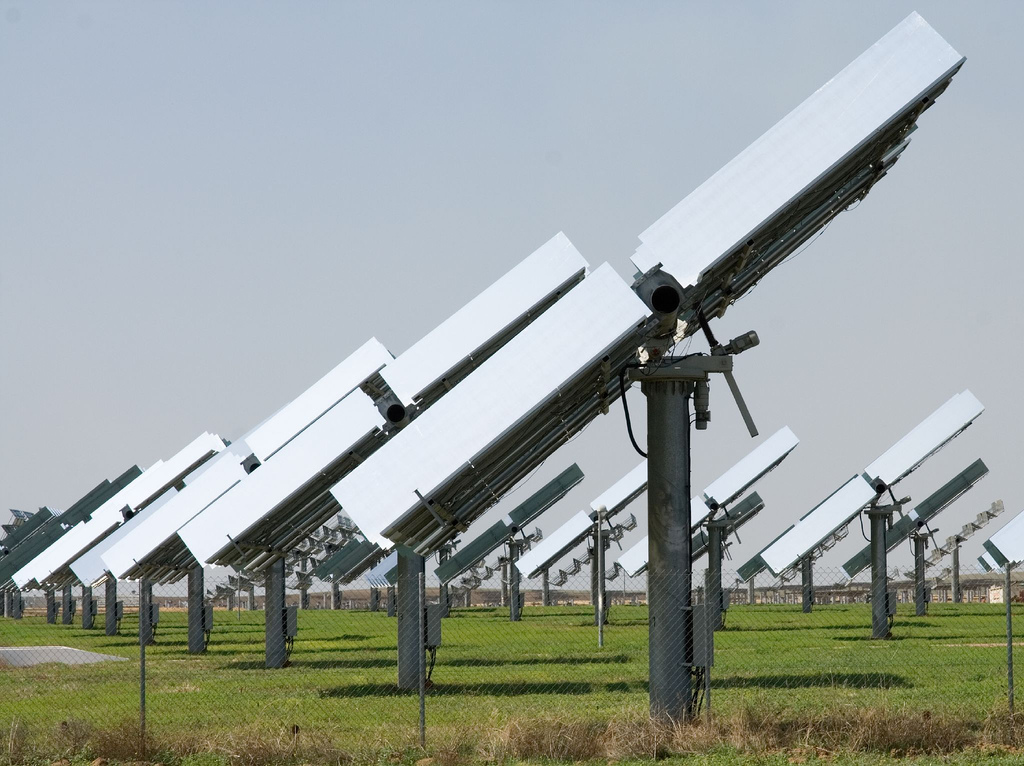
- Country: Spain
- Location: Solar Platform
- Coordinates: 37°25′18″N 6°15′25″W
- Status: Operational
- Owner: Abengoa Solar

Solar farm
- Type: CPV

Power generation
- Units operational: 154
- Nameplate capacity: 1.2 MW
- Annual net output: 2.1 GWh

The Sevilla Photovoltaic Power Plant was the largest low-concentrated CPV power plant in the world. The facility is located in the Solar Platform (Solucar Complex), a region dedicated to solar power developments, in Sanlúcar la Mayor, Spain.

The plant utilizes 154 two-axis tracking units, consisting of 36 photovoltaic modules each. The entire plant covers an area of 295,000 m^{2} (3,180,000 sq ft), with a total PV surface area of 5,913 m^{2} (63,647 sq ft). The maximum electrical installed capacity tops at 1.2 MW, with a conversion efficiency of 12%. The plant generates 2.1 GWh annually.

== See also ==
- List of power stations in Spain
