= List of power stations in Spain =

This is a list of the largest power stations in Spain.

== Hydroelectric ==
Station	Location	Coordinates	Capacity (MW)
Alcántara Dam	Alcántara	39°43′47″N 6°53′06″W	916
Aldeadávila Dam	Aldeadávila de la Ribera	41°12′41″N 6°41′13″W	1,200
Almendra Dam	Almendra	41°16′14″N 6°19′12″W	857
Mequinenza Dam	Mequinenza	41°22′08″N 0°16′24″W	384
Moralets-Llauset	Moralets-Llauset	42°34′51″N 0°41′40″W	210
Sallente-Estany Gento	Sallente-Estany Gento	42°30′24″N 0°59′46″E	339
Talarn Dam	Talarn	42°10′47″N 0°54′48″E	30

== Nuclear ==
Name	Location	Coordinates	Type	Capacity, MWe	Operational	Notes
Almaraz NPP	Almaraz	39°48′27″N 5°41′55″W	PWR	2093	1983–	
Ascó Unit I	Ascó	41°11′59″N 0°34′06″E	PWR	1030	1984–	
Ascó Unit II	Ascó	41°11′59″N 0°34′06″E	PWR	1030	1984–	
Cofrentes NPP	Cofrentes	39°12′47″N 1°03′03″W	BWR	994	1985–	
Santa María de Garoña NPP	Santa María de Garoña	42°46′31″N 3°12′26″W	BWR	460	1971–2013	
José Cabrera NPP	Almonacid de Zorita	40°20′53″N 2°53′08″W	PWR	142	1968–2006	
Trillo NPP	Trillo	40°42′05″N 2°37′22″W	PWR	1066	1988–	
Vandellòs Unit I	Vandellòs	40°57′04″N 0°51′59″E	GCR	480	1972–1989	shut down after fire
Vandellòs Unit II	Vandellòs	40°57′03″N 0°51′55″E	PWR	992	1988–	

== Solar ==
Name	Location	Coordinates	Capacity, MWp	Operational	Notes
Olmedilla Photovoltaic Park	Olmedilla de Alarcón	39°37′N 2°04′W	60	2008	
Alvarado I	Alvarado	38°50′N 6°50′W	50	2009	Solar thermal
Puertollano Photovoltaic Park	Puertollano	38°37′N 3°58′W	47.6	2008	
La Magascona and Magasquila photovoltaic power stations	La Magascona	39°26′N 5°56′W	34.5	2008	
Arnedo Solar Plant	Arnedo	42°16′N 1°41′W	34	2008	
Dulcinea Solar Plant	Cuenca	39°39′N 2°48′W	31.8	2009	
Spex	Mérida	38°53′N 6°17′W	30	2008	
Osa de la Vega Solar Plant	Cuenca	38°39′N 2°48′W	30	2008	
Fuente Álamo Solar Power Plant	Fuente-Álamo	37°41′N 1°49′W	26	2008	
Guadarranque solar power plant	Guadarranque	36°11′N 5°25′W	20	2008	

== Fossil fuels ==
Name	Location	Coordinates	Fuel	Capacity, MWe	Operational	Notes
Endesa Termic	As Pontes	43°26′29″N 7°51′46″W	Coal	1468	1974–2024	356 metres tall chimney
Teruel Power Plant	Teruel	40°59′50″N 0°22′50″W	Coal	1050	1981-2020	343 metres tall chimney
Central Tèrmica, Sant Adria de Besos	Sant Adria de Besos	41°25′37″N 2°14′06″E	Natural Gas		1976-2011	
Central Térmica de Meirama	Lousa de Arriba	43°10′03″N 8°24′38″W	Coal	580	1980-2020	
Compostilla II Power Station	Cubillos del Sil	42°36′47″N 6°33′46″W	Coal	1314	1961-2020	
Los Barrios Power Plant	Los Barrios	36°10′55″N 5°25′11″W	Coal	567.5	1985-	Kept in reserve
Central térmica de Morvedre	Sagunto	39°38′37″N 0°13′54″W	Natural Gas	1212	2007-	
Central térmica Litoral de Almería	Carboneras	36°58′42″N 1°54′18″W	Coal	1168	1985-2021	
Central térmica de Sabón	Arteixo	43°19′49″N 8°30′10″W	Coal	400	1972-2010	
Barcelona power station	Barcelona	41°20′12″N 2°09′33″E	Natural Gas	866	2008-	
As Pontes power station	As Pontes	43°26′29″N 7°51′46″W	Natural Gas	856	2008-	
Cubelles power station	Barcelona		Natural gas	520	1975–2015	
Besós power station	Barcelona		Natural gas	800	2002–	
Besós V power station	Barcelona		Natural gas	860	2011–	

== See also ==
- Energy policy of the European Union
- List of power stations in Europe
- List of largest power stations in the world
- Electricity Network of the Balearic Islands
