= Carmen Vargas =

Spanish microbiologist and academic administrator

Carmen Vargas is a Spanish microbiologist and academic administrator serving as rector of the University of Seville since 2025.

== Life ==
Vargas was born in Sanlúcar la Mayor, Spain and comes from a family of merchants. She is the first university-educated person in her family. She studied pharmacy at the University of Seville.

Vargas is a professor of microbiology. She served as vice-rector for internationalization under the outgoing rector Miguel Ángel Castro.

Vargas won the University of Seville rectorship election in the second round. They were first elections held by universal weighted suffrage in 20 years. On 15 November 2025, her six-year appointment as rector of University of Seville was approved by the Regional Government of Andalusia. She is the first woman to hold this position in the 520-year history of the institution. The investiture ceremony took place on 12 December 2025.
