= Electric Power System of the Balearic Islands =

Description of the electric power supply of the Balearic Islands.

== Menorca ==
On Menorca just a single power plant exists at Mahon ( Maó ) at 39°53′49″N 4°15′31″E. It is oil fired and has a net generation capacity of 245 MW. From it 2 132 kV-lines run to Dragonera substation.

=== 132 kV/15 kV-Substations ===
Beside the connection between Mahon ( Maó) power station and Dragonera substation, there is a 132 kV-line interconnecting the following substations.

Location	Coordinates
Dragonera	39°53′28″N 4°14′12″E
Es Mercadal	39°58′37″N 4°5′44″E
Ciutadella	40°0′12″N 3°51′19″E

=== Planned 132 kV/15 kV Substations ===
Location	Coordinates
Poima	39°53′9″N 4°14′3″E
Oeste	40°0′38″N 3°51′40″E

=== Power cable to Mallorca ===
A 132 kV-line links Ciutadella substation on Menorca with Es Bessons substation on Mallorca. It runs from Ciutadella substation overhead to Celan Bosch cable terminal at 39°55′55″N 3°50′1″E where the submarine cable to Mallorca starts. It ends at Cala Mesquida cable terminal at Cala Mesquida 39°44′19″N 3°25′38″E, where the overhead line to Es Bessons substation starts.

== Ibiza/Formentera ==
On Ibiza and Formentera, there are two thermal power stations, one on Ibiza, the other on Formentera.

Station	Place	Fuel type	Capacity (MW)	Year of inauguration	Coordinates
Elvissa Power Station	Elvissa	Natural Gas / Diesel backup	292 MW		38°55′9″N 1°25′51″E
Formentera Power Station	Sant Francesc	Natural Gas	14 MW		38°41′31″N 1°27′49″E

=== 69 kV/15 kV substation ===
The substations on Ibiza are interconnected together with Elvissa Power Station over a 69 kV-ring running from Elvissa Power Station via Torrent, Santa Eularia, Sant Antoni and Sant Jordi. Beside this, there is a connection between Torrent and San Antonio. Since 2007 a 69 kV-cable with a capacity of 50 MW connects the powergrid of Formentera with that of Ibiza. The terminals of this cable are Torrent and Formentera Power Station. From Torrent a 132 kV three phase AC link to Santa Ponsa, Mallorca is under construction (capacity 2 x 100 MV).

Place	Coordinates
Sant Jordi	38°54′16″N 1°22′41″E
Sant Antoni	38°57′26″N 1°20′10″E
Torrent	38°56′9″N 1°25′57″E
Santa Eulària	39°0′23″N 1°29′25″E

=== Planned 69 kV/15 kV-Substation ===
Location	Coordinates
Bossa	38°53′28″N 1°23′56″E

== Mallorca ==
=== Power Stations ===
There are three thermal power plants on Mallorca. The first two feed in the 220 kV-grid

Station	Location	Type	Capacity (MW)	Year of inauguration	Coordinates
Murterar Power Station	Alcudia	coal-/oil-fired	527.8 MW		39°48′35″N 3°5′31″E
Son Reus Power Station	Palma	gas turbine	432.8 MW		39°38′55″N 2°40′48″E
Cas Tresorer Power Station	Palma	gas turbine	400 MW		39°34′3″N 2°41′22″E

=== HVDC-connection to the mainland ===
An HVDC cable (±250 kV) with the name Cometa has been commissioned in August 2012. The converter substation is at Santa Ponsa 39°32′2″N 2°30′21″E. It will also contain a 220 kV/132 kV-substation, from which a 132 kV submarine cable for three-phase AC will run to Torrent on Ibiza.

=== 220 kV/69 kV-Substations ===
The backbone of power supply of Mallorca is the 220 kV grid. The following stations are in service

Place	Coordinates
Es Bessons	39°34′55″N 3°9′29″E
Llubi	39°40′24″N 3°2′22″E
Son Reus	39°39′3″N 2°40′44″E
Valldurgent	39°35′3″N 2°32′57″E
Son Orlandis	39°36′1″N 2°44′40″E
Murterar Power Station	39°48′34″N 3°5′33″E

2 lines interconnect Valldurgent with Son Reus, Llubi with Murterar PowerStation and Llubi with Es Bessons substation. A single ring-line interconnects Llubi, Son Reus and Son Orlandis substation. New 220 kV-substations are planned/under construction at Santa Ponsa, Rafal, Latzer and Lucmajor. A three-phase 132 kV AC cable between Es Bessons and Ciutadella on Menorca is under construction.

=== 69 kV/15 kV-Substations ===
Distribution of electric power is done by 69 kV and 15 kV grids. The following 69 kV stations are in service.

Place	Coordinates
Pollença	39°53′3″N 3°3′22″E
Poligon	39°36′30″N 2°39′33″E
Es Rafal	39°35′29″N 2°37′57″E
S'Arenal	39°31′35″N 2°46′22″E
Marratxi	39°36′41″N 2°43′35″E
Bunyola	39°41′4″N 2°42′14″E
Inca	39°42′50″N 2°55′3″E
Manacor	39°34′24″N 3°11′25″E
Arta	39°40′52″N 3°20′35″E
Llucmajor	39°29′53″N 2°54′1″E
Santanyi	39°22′1″N 3°7′2″E
Ciutadella	40°0′12″N 3°51′19″E
Calvià	39°31′36″N 2°30′26″E
Portocolom	39°25′15″N 3°14′9″E
Andraitx	39°32′40″N 2°25′21″E
Nuredduna	39°33′49″N 2°39′49″E
Sa Pobla	39°45′48″N 3°1′54″E
Sant Joan de Déu	39°32′50″N 2°42′6″E
Sa Vinyeta	39°42′32″N 2°53′51″E
Sant Agusti	39°33′13″N 2°35′35″E
Cala Millor	39°35′0″N 3°21′47″E
Can Picafort	39°44′50″N 3°9′21″E
Palma Airport Substation	39°32′30″N 2°43′19″E
Palma Nova Substation	39°30′57″N 2°32′2″E
Santa Catalina Substation	39°34′18″N 2°38′10″E
Central Tèrmica del Besòs	41°25′6″N 2°13′45″E
Palma/Coliseu	39°35′11″N 2°39′25″E

=== Planned 69 kV/15 kV-Substations ===
Place	Coordinates
Montuiri	39°35′19″N 2°58′44″E
Son Oms	39°32′22″N 2°44′6″E
Ses Veles	39°39′26″N 2°41′20″E
Xoriggo	39°34′34″N 2°48′7″E
Bit	39°38′8″N 2°39′6″E
Cala d'Or	39°23′8″N 3°14′28″E

== See also ==
- List of power stations in Spain
- Cometa
