= Dulcinea (disambiguation) =

Dulcinea is a character in Don Quixote by Miguel de Cervantes.

Dulcinea may also refer to:

- Dulcinea (album), a 1994 album by Toad the Wet Sprocket
- Dulcinea (film), a 1963 film starring Millie Perkins and Cameron Mitchell
- Dulcinea (1947 film), based on a play by Gaston Baty and starring Ana Mariscal
- "Dulcinea" (The Expanse), a television episode
- Operation Dulcinea, the 1961 Santa Maria hijacking of a Portuguese luxury liner
- "Dulcinea", a song by Isis from In the Absence of Truth
- 571 Dulcinea, an asteroid
- Dulcinea mine, copper mine in Chile
- Dulcinea Solar Plant, a power plant in Cuenca, Spain
- Dulcinea (planet) or mu Arae c, an exoplanet
