= Mula Photovoltaic Power Plant =

Spanish photovoltaic power plant

- Official name: Central Fotovoltaica Mula
- Country: Spain
- Location: Mula, Region of Murcia
- Coordinates: 37°57′24″N 1°24′20″W
- Commission date: 2019
- Owner: Northleaf

Solar farm
- Type: Flat-panel PV

Power generation
- Nameplate capacity: 494 MW

The Mula Photovoltaic Power Plant is a 494 megawatt (MW) photovoltaic power station in Mula, Region of Murcia, Spain. Built by Cobra (ACS Group), it opened in July 2019.

At the time of its opening, it was the largest photovoltaic power station in Europe, replacing Cestas Solar Park in France.

== See also ==
- Solar power in Spain
- Photovoltaic power stations
- List of largest power stations in the world
- List of photovoltaic power stations
