= Casas de Los Pinos Solar Power Plant =

Photovoltaic power station in Castile-La Mancha, Spain

- Country: Spain
- Location: Castile-La Mancha
- Coordinates: 39°16′33″N 2°24′31″W
- Status: Operational
- Commission date: November 2007

Solar farm
- Type: Flat-panel PV

Power generation
- Units operational: 120
- Nameplate capacity: 10 MW

The Casas de Los Pinos Solar Power Plant is a 10 MW photovoltaic power station in Castile-La Mancha, Spain. The facility was commissioned in November 2007, and was developed by Renovalia Solar SL. The plant consists of 120 Solaria and Suntech units of 100 kW, with a total of 69,850 photovoltaic panels.

== See also ==
- List of power stations in Spain
