= Besós V power station =

Gas-fired power plant in Barcelona

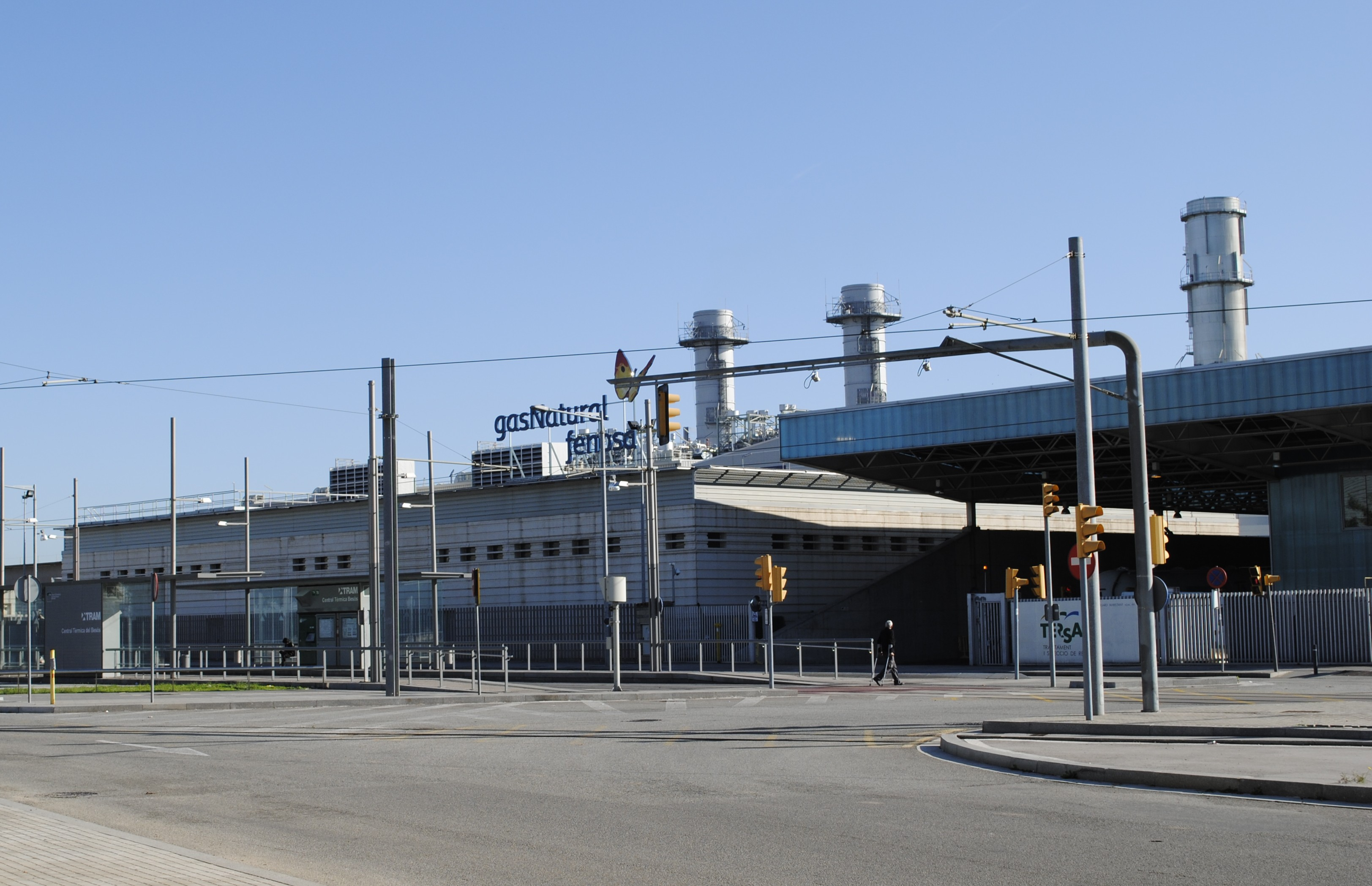
- Official name: Central Térmica de Ciclo Combinado del Besòs
- Country: Spain
- Location: Sant Adrià de Besòs near Barcelona
- Coordinates: 41°25′10″N 02°13′47″E
- Status: Operational
- Commission date: 2008/2011
- Owner: Endesa
- Operator: Endesa

Thermal power station
- Primary fuel: Natural gas
- Combined cycle?: Yes

Power generation
- Units operational: 2 x 430 MW (total: 860MW)
- Nameplate capacity: 859 MW

Besós V power station (Central Térmica de Ciclo Combinado del Besòs) is a combined cycle thermoelectric plant located in Sant Adrià de Besòs, suburb of Barcelona, Spain. It consists of two 430 MW thermal units fueled with natural gas, was connected to the grid in 2011 and is owned by Endesa.

== See also ==
- List of power stations in Spain
- Barcelona power station
- Besós power station
