= Lucainena de las Torres Photovoltaic Power Station =

Photovoltaic power station in Lucainena de las Torres, Almería in Spain

- Official name: Planta fotovoltaica de Lucainena de las Torres
- Country: Spain
- Location: Lucainena de las Torres, Almería
- Coordinates: 37°00′50″N 2°10′41″W
- Status: Operational
- Commission date: 2008

Solar farm
- Type: Flat-panel PV

Power generation
- Nameplate capacity: 15.3 MW

The Lucainena de las Torres Photovoltaic Power Station (Spanish: Planta fotovoltaica de Lucainena de las Torres) is a photovoltaic power station in Lucainena de las Torres, Almería in Spain. It consists of different units. Lucainena de las Torres 1 has a total capacity of 7.4 MWp and its annual output is about 11.42 GWh. It was commissioned in July 2008. Lucainena de las Torres 2 has a total capacity of 7.9 MWpand its annual output is about 12.236 GWh. It was commissioned in July 2008.

== See also ==
- Photovoltaic power stations
