= Besós power station =

Gas-fired power plant in Barcelona

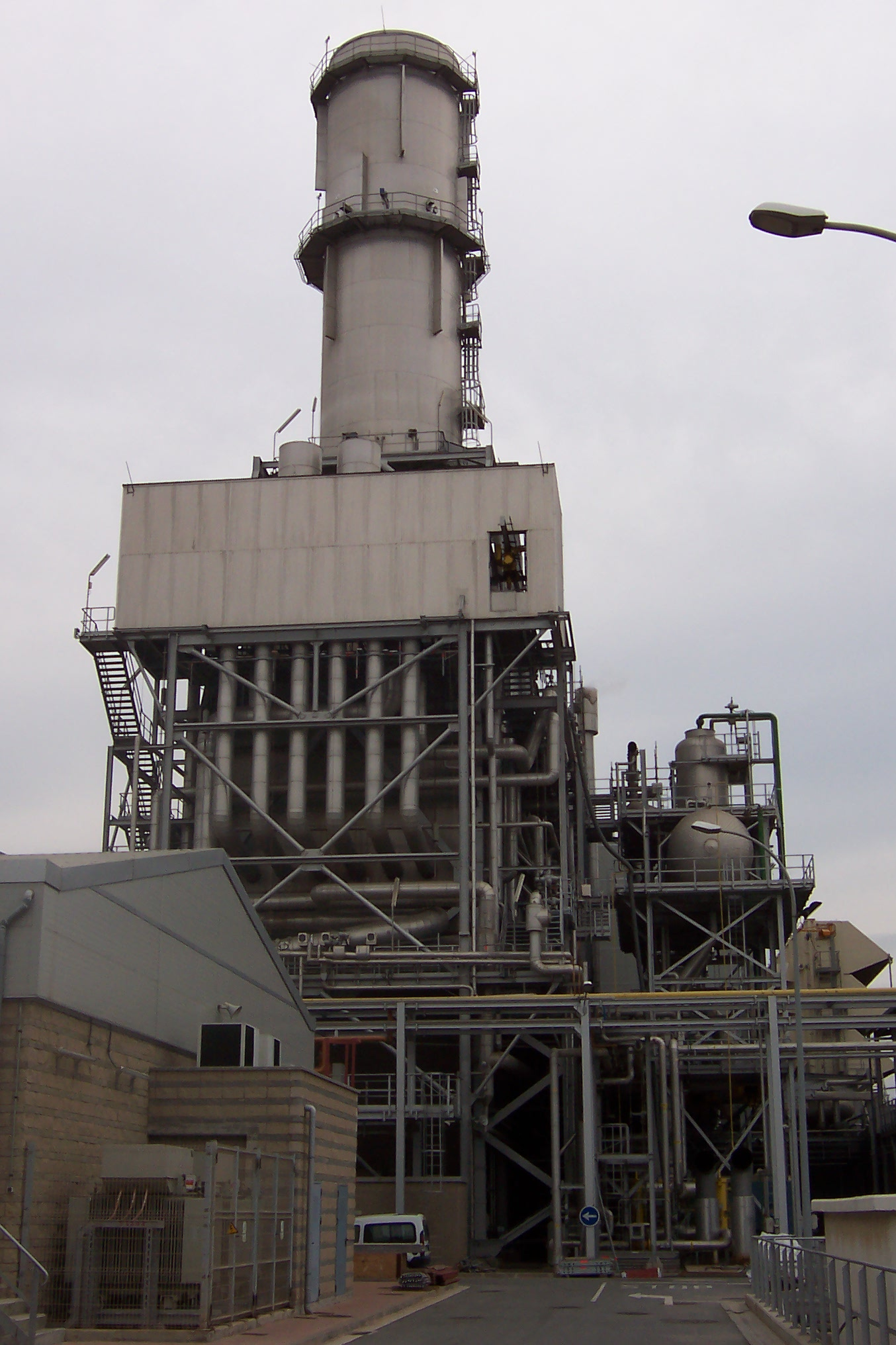
- Country: Spain
- Location: Sant Adrià de Besòs near Barcelona
- Coordinates: 41°25′10″N 02°13′47″E
- Status: Operational
- Commission date: 2000/2002
- Owners: Gas Natural, Endesa
- Operators: Gas Natural, Endesa

Thermal power station
- Primary fuel: Natural gas
- Combined cycle?: Yes

Power generation
- Units operational: 2 x 400 MW (total: 800MW)
- Nameplate capacity: 812 MW

Besós power station is a combined cycle thermoelectric plant located in Sant Adrià de Besòs, suburb of Barcelona, Spain. It consists of two 400 MW thermal units fueled with natural gas, was connected to the grid in 2002 and is owned 50% of Gas Natural and Endesa.

== See also ==
- List of power stations in Spain
- Barcelona power station
- Besós V power station
