= Sagunto Power Station =

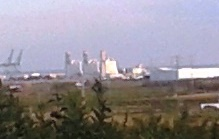
- Official name: Central térmica de Sagunto
- Country: Spain
- Location: Sagunto near Valencia
- Coordinates: 39°38′34″N 0°13′58″W
- Status: Operational
- Commission date: 2007
- Owner: Unión Fenosa
- Operator: Naturgy

Thermal power station
- Primary fuel: Natural gas
- Combined cycle?: Yes

Power generation
- Units operational: 3 x 404.2 MW
- Make and model: Siemens
- Nameplate capacity: 1,212.6 MW

External links
- Commons: Related media on Commons

Sagunto Power Station (Spanish: Central térmica de Sagunto) is a natural gas-fired combined-cycled power station in Sagunto near Valencia, Spain. It went into operation in 2007. The power station is owned and operated by Unión Fenosa.

The power station consists of three identical units with an electrical power output of 1,212.6 MW. Each of these units is including a 65 metres (213 ft) high flue gas stack. It was built and equipped by Siemens. Each of the units has an efficiency of 57%. The power station is connected via a 380 kV double-circuit powerline with Gauss substation. On the area of the facility at present, the static inverter of HVDC Cometa is under construction.

== See also ==
- List of power stations in Spain
