= Cubelles power station =

Thermoelectric plant in Spain

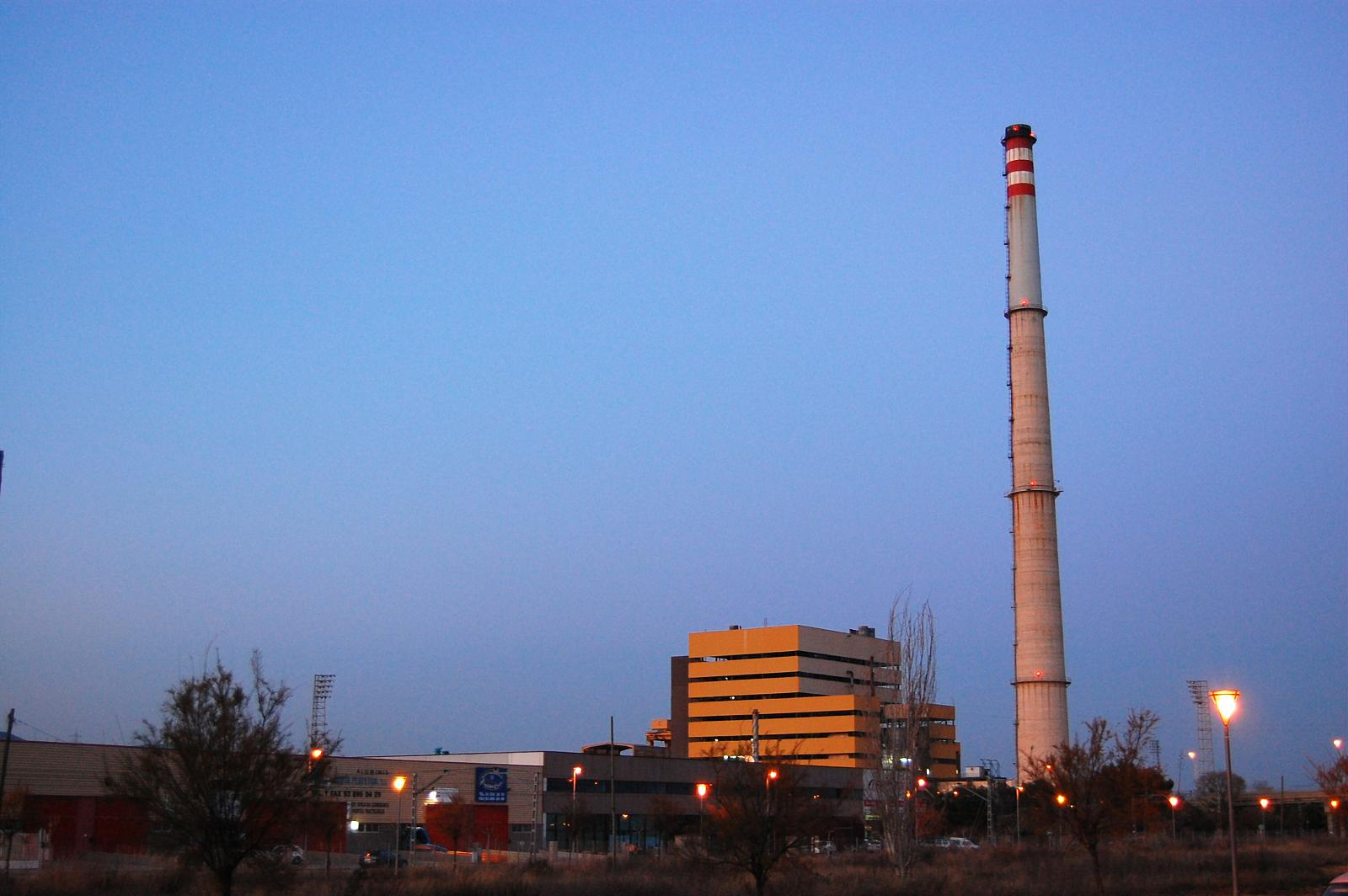
- Official name: Central térmica de Cubellas; Central térmica de Foix
- Country: Spain
- Location: Cubelles, Province of Barcelona
- Coordinates: 41°12′36″N 01°40′25″E
- Status: Operational
- Commission date: 1975/1979
- Decommission date: 2015/2019
- Operator: Endesa

Thermal power station
- Primary fuel: Natural gas

Power generation
- Units operational: 520 MW
- Nameplate capacity: 520 MW

External links
- Commons: Related media on Commons

Cubelles power station (Central térmica de Cubellas / Central térmica de Foix) - thermoelectric plant located in Cubelles, in Province of Barcelona, Spain. In June 2015 the stop of operations was announced. In 2019 was completely demolished.

== See also ==
- List of power stations in Spain
