= Barcelona power station =

Gas-fired power plant in Spain

Thermal power station of Barcelona
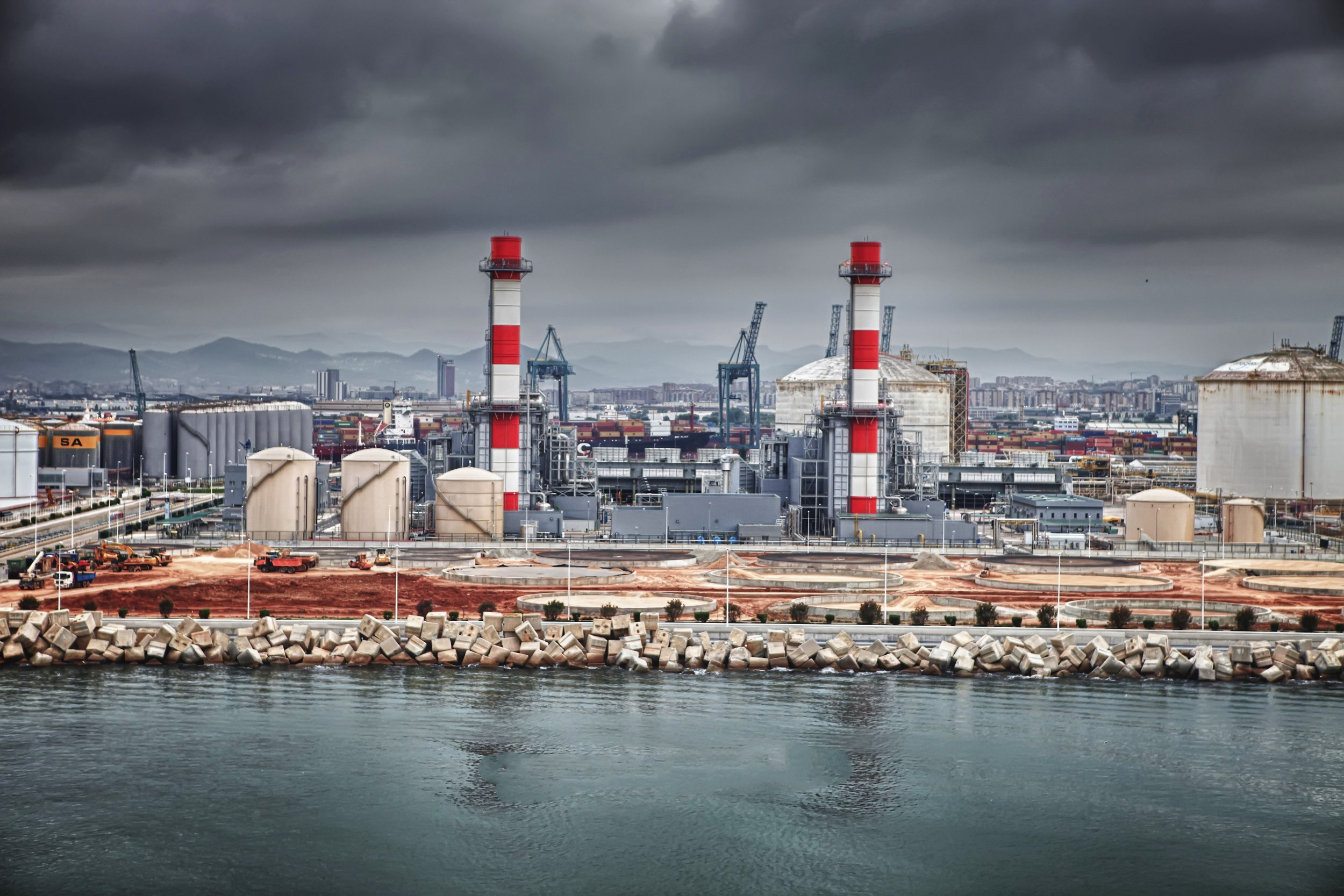
- Country: Spain
- Location: Barcelona
- Coordinates: 41°20′12″N 02°09′33″E
- Status: Operational
- Commission date: 2008/2011
- Owner: Gas Natural
- Operator: Naturgy

Thermal power station
- Primary fuel: Natural gas
- Combined cycle?: Yes

Power generation
- Units operational: 2 x 425 MW (total: 850MW)
- Nameplate capacity: 866 MW

External links
- Commons: Related media on Commons

Barcelona power station (also Power station of Barcelona) is a combined cycle thermoelectric plant located at Pier Energy of Port of Barcelona, in Barcelona, Spain. It has 2 thermal units of 425 MW, which use natural gas as fuel, and with a total electric power of 850 MW. It is owned by the multinational company Gas Natural.

== See also ==
- List of power stations in Spain
- Besós power station
- Besós V power station
