= Abengoa Solar =

Spanish solar energy company

- Type: Private
- Industry: Solar power
- Headquarters: Sanlúcar la Mayor, Spain
- Area served: Global
- Parent: Abengoa
- Website: www.abengoasolar.com

Abengoa Solar (formerly Solúcar Energía) is a subsidiary of Abengoa. Its primary activities include designing, promotion, financing attainment, construction and operation of solar power stations that use photovoltaics, concentrated photovoltaics, or concentrated solar thermal technologies. As a consequence of the heavy debt of the Abengoa group, Abengoa Solar was sold in January 2023 to Rioglass Solar Holding.

== Abengoa Solar and innovation ==
Over 42.4 million euros were invested in R&D in 2011 and a total over 150 million euros since 2007.

Given the importance of R&D, legal protection of industrial and intellectual property advancements is critical. The company, therefore, holds priority rights to various key inventions. 115 CSP and PV technology patent applications were registered as of May 2012.

== Solar power tower ==
Abengoa Solar owns Europe's first commercially operating concentrating solar power plant, the 11 MW PS10 Solar Power Plant, which uses solar power tower technology, a form of concentrated solar thermal technology. The Spanish plant was featured in an episode of World's Strangest on the SciFi network and James May's Big Ideas on the BBC.

== Projects using Abengoa's technology ==
- Solana Generating Station, Arizona

== See also ==
- Solar power in Spain
- Renewable energy in the European Union
- Energy policy of the European Union
