= Turrillas =

- Municipality
- Turrillas

- Flag Coat of arms

- Location within Spain
- Coordinates: 37°02′N 2°16′W
- Country: Spain
- Community: Andalusia
- Province: Almería

Government
  - Mayor: Juan Antonio Verdejo Padilla (PP)

Area
  - Total: 39 km^{2} (15 sq mi)
- Elevation: 847 m (2,779 ft)

Population (2025-01-01)
  - Total: 256
  - Density: 6.6/km^{2} (17/sq mi)
- Time zone: UTC+1 (CET)
  - Summer (DST): UTC+2 (CEST)
- Postal code: 04211
- Website: Official website

Turrillas is a municipality of Almería province, in the autonomous community of Andalusia, Spain.

The township is built quite high up on the north-west facing slopes of the Sierra Alhamilla. It is accessed either by a winding road from Lucainena de las Torres or from a road off the main Sorbas to Tabernas N-340a road.

From Turrillas there are views of the opposite Sierras, the Sorbas basin and of the agricultural land use; such land use is primarily revolves around olive production and some almond production. For those interested in agricultural practices there is evidence of old terrace agriculture on the hillside adjacent to the town and also evidence of a qanat irrigation system on the alluvial fan directly below the town.

As of June 18, 2008, a series of Windmills are being erected on the mountain range behind Turrillas, to provide power to the National Grid. Construction began early 2008 with works to widen the roads, in order to transport the large blades and towers needed, temporary wind test antenna have been erected in order to discover the possible amount of electricity to be gained by the windmills. The initial stage of testing was successful. Construction is expected to be finished by the end of 2008.

== Demographics ==
Historical population
Year	Pop.	±%
1999	247	—
2000	250	+1.2%
2001	249	−0.4%
2002	242	−2.8%
2003	235	−2.9%
2004	240	+2.1%
2005	241	+0.4%
Source: INE (Spain)

== Culture ==
The annual fiesta, in honor of San Antonio takes place on June 13, 14, and 15 of every year. Celebrations go late into the night, with a concert taking place on the town square, live music and bars. There is also a parade on horseback past La ermita de San Antonio, which is situated in the lower part of the town. La ermita de San Antonio was built in the 17th century, as a remembrance between the battles that took place between the Moors and Christians in this area.

== Transportation ==
AENA (Aeropuertos Españoles y Navegación Aérea) has a relay outpost situated on the Sierra behind Turrillas, serving Almería Airport, and flights heading in the direction of Africa. The Communications Centre in Turrillas began operations in 2003.

== Gallery ==
Turrillas Sunset

Turrillas Countryside

Turrillas From Above

== See also ==
- List of municipalities in Almería
