= Guadarranque Solar Power Plant =

Photovoltaic solar power plant

- Official name: Parque Solar Guadarranque
- Country: Spain
- Coordinates: 36°11′35″N 5°25′05″W
- Status: Operational
- Commission date: September 2008
- Construction cost: €90 million
- Owner: Endesa

Solar farm
- Type: Flat-panel PV

Power generation
- Units operational: 67,650
- Nameplate capacity: 12.3 MW; Planned: 20.1 MW
- Annual net output: 24 GWh

Guadarranque solar power plant (also known as Cádiz solar power plant, Spanish: Parque Solar Guadarranque, or Planta Solar Guadarranque) is a photovoltaic solar power plant in the Guadarranque industrial park in San Roque, Cádiz, Spain. The plant is owned and operated by Endesa.

In 2007, Endesa received a municipal permit to build a 20.1 megawatt (MW) photovoltaic solar power plant. Construction on the first stage of the plant began in July 2007 and was finished in September 2008. The first stage has an installed capacity of 12.3 MW and covers 37 hectares (91 acres). It consists of 123 photovoltaic installations, each including 550 220-watt solar panels. The first stage cost €90 million and its annual generation is estimated at 24 GWh.

Electricity production at the plant will increase during the summer months due to the higher number of daylight hours. This will help to meet the significant rise in power demand in Andalusia in the summer.

== See also ==
- Solar power in Spain
