= Osa de la Vega Solar Plant =

Solar power plant in Cuenca, Spain

- Official name: Planta Solar Osa de la Vega
- Country: Spain
- Location: Cuenca
- Coordinates: 39°39′N 2°48′W
- Status: Operational
- Commission date: 2008

Solar farm
- Type: Flat-panel PV

Power generation
- Nameplate capacity: 30 MW

Osa de la Vega Solar Plant is a 30 MW solar photovoltaic power plant located in the Province of Cuenca (Spain).

== See also ==
- List of power stations in Spain
- List of photovoltaic power stations
