= Puertollano Photovoltaic Park =

Photovoltaic power station

- Country: Spain
- Location: Puertollano
- Coordinates: 38°37′18″N 3°58′29″W
- Status: Operational
- Commission date: 2008
- Owner: Renovalia

Solar farm
- Type: Flat-panel PV

Power generation
- Units operational: 231,653
- Nameplate capacity: 47.6 MW

The Puertollano Photovoltaic Park is the fourth largest photovoltaic power station in the world, with a nominal capacity of 47.6 MW. The facility is located in Puertollano, Spain. 476 individual plants with a nominal power of 100 kWp, Suntech and Solaria modules. Fixed structure oriented at 33° south with a total of 231,653 panels.

== See also ==
- List of largest power stations in the world
- List of photovoltaic power stations
- List of power stations in Spain
