= Abertura Photovoltaic Power Station =

Photovoltaic power station

- Official name: Parque Fotovoltaico Abertura Solar
- Country: Abertura, Cáceres
- Location: Spain
- Coordinates: 39°13′34″N 5°46′44″W
- Status: Operational
- Operator: Iberdrola

Solar farm
- Type: Flat-panel PV

Power generation
- Nameplate capacity: 23.1 MW

Abertura Photovoltaic Power Station (Spanish: Parque Fotovoltaico Abertura Solar) is a photovoltaic power station in the municipality of Abertura, Cáceres in Spain. It has a total capacity of 23.1 MWp. The solar park was built by Iberinco. Double axes solar trackers were provided by Mecasolar and Inspira. The financing consortium was led by West LB, Bank of Scotland and Dexia. A technical advisor was Sylcom Solar.

== See also ==
- Photovoltaic power stations
