= Arnedo Solar Plant =

Solar photovoltaic power plant

- Official name: Planta Solar Arnedo
- Country: Spain
- Location: Arnedo, La Rioja
- Coordinates: 42°16′10″N 1°41′36″W
- Status: Operational
- Commission date: 2008
- Construction cost: €181 million

Solar farm
- Type: Flat-panel PV
- Site area: 70 ha (173 acres)

Power generation
- Units operational: 172,000
- Nameplate capacity: 34 MW

The Arnedo Solar Plant is a solar photovoltaic power plant located in Arnedo, La Rioja, Spain. The power system installations are supplied and the solar plant is operated by T-Solar. The plant was built by Isolux Corsán in 2008. It cost €181 million.

The Arnedo Solar Plant has a capacity of 34 MW which is provided by 172,000 modules 200 W each. The plant is located on 70 hectares (173 acres). It produces approximately 49,936,510 kWh annually, equivalent to the power consumption of 11,451 households.

== See also ==
- List of power stations in Spain
- List of photovoltaic power stations
