= Cometa (HVDC) =

Undersea electric power transmission system

- Location of Cometa

Location
- Country: Spain
- From: Morvedre 39°38′28″N 0°14′7″W
- To: Santa Ponsa 39°32′2″N 2°30′21″E

Ownership information
- Owner: Red Eléctrica de España

Construction information
- Cable manufacturer: Prysmian; Nexans
- Cable installer: Prysmian; Nexans
- Cable layer: C/S Giulio Verne; C/S Nexans Skagerrak
- Substation manufacturer: Siemens
- Contractors: Trenching: MPSV Edda Fjord; C/S Argo 1
- Commissioned: Aug 2012

Technical information
- Type: submarine cable
- Current type: HVDC
- Total length: 247 km (153 mi)
- Capacity: 400 MW
- AC voltage: 230 kV
- DC voltage: 250 kV
- No. of poles: 2

COMETA (abbreviation for COnexión MEditerránea Transporte Alta tensión; also known as the Majorca–Valencia interconnector and the Romulus project) is an undersea electric power transmission system between mainland Spain and the island of Majorca. It connects Morvedre near Valencia and Santa Ponsa near Palma de Mallorca. The project was developed by Red Electrica de España. The project aimed to connect the Balearic Islands with the Spanish peninsular grid, providing a better electrical supply to the two isolated Balearic grids.

== History ==
On 26 September 2007, contracts between Red Electrica de España and the cable manufacturers Nexans and Prysmian were signed. On 9 October 2007, a contract with Siemens was signed for supplying two converter stations.

The laying of the first cable started on 13 January 2011 and the laying of the second cable started on 27 January 2011. The first cable was laid by the cable ship Giulio Verne and the second cable was laid by the cable ship Nexans Skagerrak. Trenching was done by waterjet from the Multipurpose Supply Vessel (MPSV) Edda Fjord and dredger Argo I.

COMETA became operational in early 2012, initially at reduced capacity then in full capacity from August 2012. The total cost of the project was €375 million. During the first operational quarter, the Spanish grid operator estimated that the connection would mean 25 million €/year in savings, due to more efficient supply to the islands and less carbon rights.

An extension of the connection to Ibiza and Formentera was planned with a second underwater cable, (115 km) long and 800 m deep, operating at 132 kV AC.

== Technical description ==
The cable was produced and laid by Prysmian Group and Nexans SA. The system consists of two bipolar high-voltage direct current (HVDC) cables with a transmission capacity of 200 MW and an operating voltage of 250 kV of each, and a metal return cable. It has a total transmission capacity of 400 MW. The maximum depth of the submarine cable is 1,485 metres (4,872 ft). It is the second longest submarine power cable after NorNed and the second deepest after SAPEI. The submarine part of the cable is 240 kilometres (149 mi) long and the land cable is 7 kilometres (4 mi) long. There are converter stations in Morvedre and Santa Ponsa, built by Siemens.
