= Lucainena de Las Torres =

Lucainena de las Torres
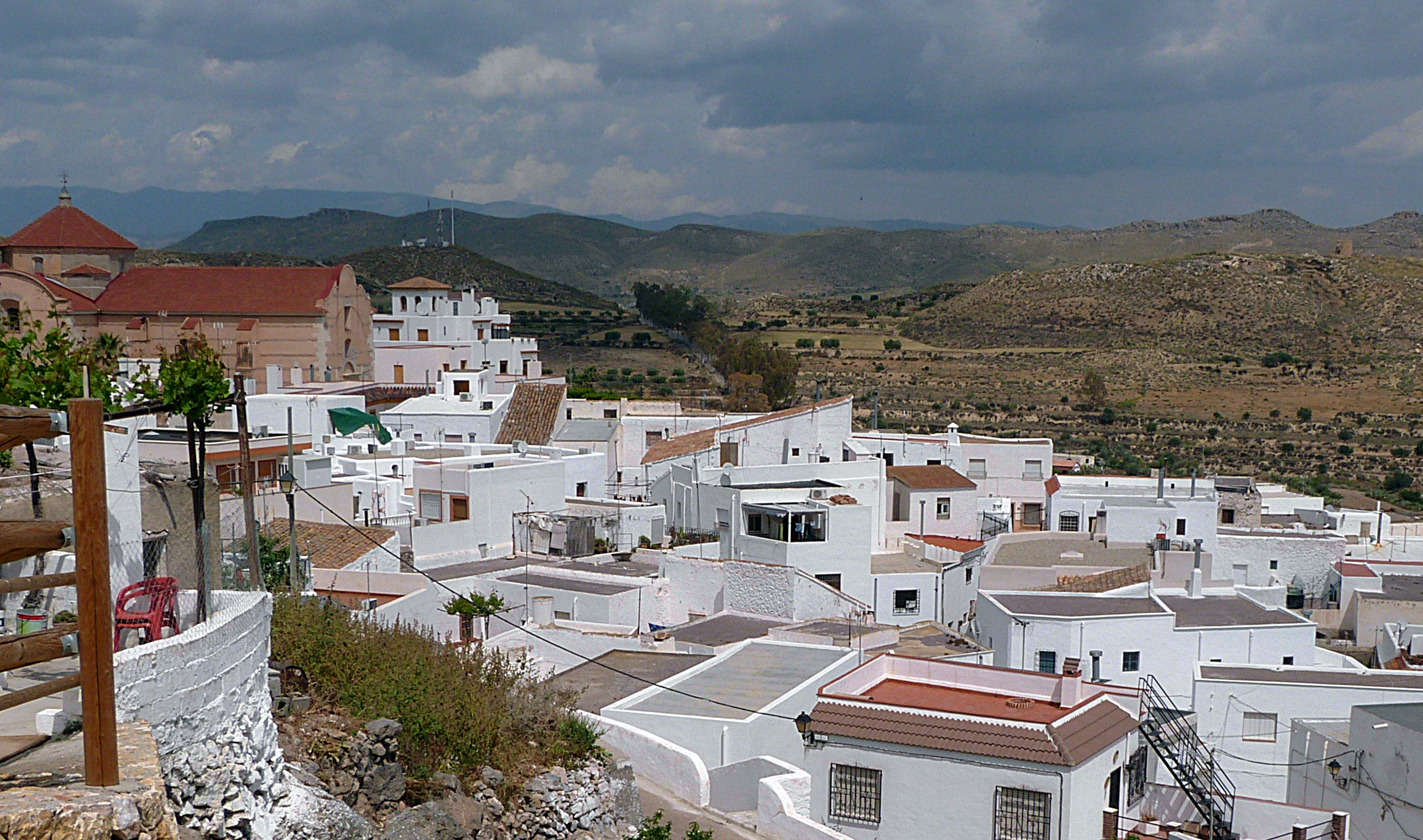
- View of Lucainena de Las Torres

- Flag Coat of arms

- Location within Spain
- Coordinates: 37°02′N 2°12′W
- Country: Spain
- Community: Andalusia
- Municipality: Almería

Government
  - Mayor: Juan Herrera Segura (PP)

Area
  - Total: 123 km^{2} (47 sq mi)
- Elevation: 542 m (1,778 ft)

Population (2025-01-01)
  - Total: 722
  - Density: 5.87/km^{2} (15.2/sq mi)
- Time zone: UTC+1 (CET)
  - Summer (DST): UTC+2 (CEST)

Lucainena de las Torres is a municipality of Almería province, in the autonomous community of Andalusia, Spain. Lucainena de las Torres belongs to the association "The Most Beautiful Villages of Spain".

== Geography ==
The municipality is located in the north of the Sierra Alhamilla, at 550 meters above sea level. The area is bordered by the natural arc of Cabo de Gata-Níjar, Sorbas and Sierra Cabrera. From Almería to Lucainena de las Torres there are 53 km and you have to take the N340 road that runs along the Tabernas desert (where world-famous westerns have been shot).

With an area of 124 km^{2}, the village currently has about 600 inhabitants. The vast majority still make a living from agriculture. The town won the 1st prize for the beautification of the villages in 1998 and among other significant things has a baroque church of the 18th century.

=== Neighbouring localities ===
The municipal territory of is bordered by that of the following municipalities: Nijar, Sorbas, Tabernas, Turrillas ... all located in the province of Almería.

== Demographics ==
Historical population
Year	Pop.	±%
1574	436	—
1752	...	—
1842	1,205	—
1857	...	—
1860	...	—
1877	2,027	—
1887	2,062	+1.7%
1897	2,601	+26.1%
1900	2,421	−6.9%
1910	3,852	+59.1%
1920	4,046	+5.0%
1930	3,239	−19.9%
1940	2,217	−31.6%
1950	2,034	−8.3%
1960	1,900	−6.6%
1970	1,198	−36.9%
1981	740	−38.2%
1991	591	−20.1%
1998	565	−4.4%
1999	595	+5.3%
2000	656	+10.3%
2001	670	+2.1%
2002	668	−0.3%
2003	621	−7.0%
2004	610	−1.8%
2005	664	+8.9%
2006	676	+1.8%
2007	696	+3.0%
2011	648	−6.9%
2012	656	+1.2%
2013	650	−0.9%
2014	614	−5.5%
2015	606	−1.3%
2016	569	−6.1%
2017	570	+0.2%
2018	546	−4.2%
2019	538	−1.5%
2020	564	+4.8%
2021	582	+3.2%
2022	595	+2.2%
Source: INE (Spain)

== Administration ==
List of mayors, since the first democratic elections.

Législature	Name of mayor	Political party
1979–1983		
1983–1987		
1987–1991		
1991–1995		
1995–1999		
1999–2003		
2003–2007		
2007–2011	Juan Herrera Segura	People's Party (Spain)
2011–2015	Juan Herrera Segura	People's Party (Spain)
2015–2019	Juan Herrera Segura	People's Party (Spain)
2019–2023	Juan Herrera Segura	People's Party (Spain)
2023–2027	Juan Herrera Segura	People's Party (Spain)

== Movies ==
Movies (or scenes) were shot there:

- Bullets Don't Argue, Bullets Don't Lie, Le Pistole non discutono (1964 from Mario Caiano with Rod Cameron, Ángel Aranda, Horst Frank, Vivi Bach, Luis Duran)
- A Bullet for Sandoval, Those Desperate Men Who Smell of Dirt and Death, Los Desperados, Quei disperatai che puzzano di sudore e di morte (1969 from Julio Buchs and Lucio Fulci with George Hilton, Ernest Borgnine, Alberto de Mendoza, Annabella Incontrera, Leo Anchoriz)

== Culture ==
Feast of San Sebastian (Third weekend of January) The tradition consists of throwing wreaths of bread to the patron saint, the martyr Saint Sebastian, during its processional parade, January 20.

Feast of the Virgin of Montesión (Third week of September: Friday, Saturday and Sunday).

Way of Saint James and the Virgin of Montesión (Fourth week of July)

== See also ==
- List of municipalities in Almería
