= Calasparra Photovoltaic Power Plant =

Power station in Murcia, Spain

- Official name: Planta solar fotovoltaico Calasparra
- Country: Spain
- Location: Calasparra, Murcia
- Coordinates: 38°15′40″N 1°40′52″W
- Status: Operational

Solar farm
- Type: Flat-panel PV

Power generation
- Nameplate capacity: 20 MW

Calasparra Photovoltaic Power Plant (Spanish: Planta solar fotovoltaico Calasparra) is a photovoltaic power station in Calasparra, Murcia in Spain. The project consists of different production units. Calasparra II is a 6.67 MW ground-mounted unit with estimated annual output of 11.82 GWh. Calasparra III is a 6.6 MW units with estimated annual output of 11.7 GWh. The project was developed by FRV and constructed by Gestamp Solar.

== See also ==
- Photovoltaic power stations
