= El Coronil Solar Power Plant =

Photovoltaic power station in El Coronil, Spain

- Country: Spain
- Coordinates: 37°05′44″N 5°37′43″W

Solar farm
- Type: Standard PV

The El Coronil Solar Power Plant (Spanish: Parque Solar El Coronil) is a photovoltaic power station in El Coronil, Spain. The project includes different generating units. El Coronil I is a 10.08 MWp project that is equipped with 386 2X trackers, and 51,794 Yingli polycrystalline photovoltaic modules, and 24 Siemens inverters of 400 kW. The annual production capacity is 20 GWh. El Coronil II has a capacity of 10.2 MWp and it is equipped with 53,206 Yingli polycrystalline photovoltaic modules, and 24 inverters of 400 kW.

== See also ==
- Photovoltaic power stations
