= Hoya de Los Vicentes Solar Plant =

Photovoltaic power station in Jumilla,

- Official name: Parque Solar Hoya de Los Vicentes
- Country: Spain
- Location: Jumilla, Murcia
- Coordinates: 38°21′52″N 1°16′34″W
- Status: Operational
- Commission date: 2008
- Owner: Elecnor

Solar farm
- Type: Flat-panel PV

Power generation
- Units operational: 120,000
- Nameplate capacity: 23 MW

The Hoya de Los Vicentes Solar Plant (Spanish: Parque Solar Hoya de Los Vicentes) is a photovoltaic power station in Jumilla, Murcia in Spain. The solar park covers area of some 100 hectares (250 acres) and comprises a group of 200 photovoltaic arrays with a total capacity of 23 MW. A total of 120,000 solar panels have been installed in the facility. The project generates energy equivalent to the annual consumption of 20,000 households.

== See also ==
- Photovoltaic power stations
