= Alvarado I =

Solar thermal power station in Spain

- Country: Spain
- Location: Alvarado, Badajoz
- Coordinates: 38°49′37″N 6°49′34″W
- Status: Operational
- Commission date: July 2009
- Owner: ContourGlobal

Solar farm
- Type: CSP
- CSP technology: Parabolic trough
- Collectors: 768
- Total collector area: 352,854 square metres (3,798,090 sq ft)
- Site resource: 2,174 kWh/m^{2}/yr

Thermal power station
- Secondary fuel: Natural gas (backup)
- Site area: 135 hectares (330 acres)

Power generation
- Nameplate capacity: 50 MW
- Annual net output: 105.2 GW·h

Alvarado I (former La Risca project) is a large solar thermal power station in Alvarado, province of Badajoz, in Extremadura, Spain. Construction on the plant commenced in December 2007 and was completed in July 2009, when commercial operations began. Built by the Spanish company Acciona Energy, it has an installed capacity of 50 MWe and lays next to the La Florida solar thermal power station.

The facility is built on a 1 km^{2} (0.4 sq mi) site with a solar resource of 2,174 KWh/m^{2}/year, producing an estimated 105,200 MWh of electricity per year (an average power of 12 MW). The plant uses parabolic trough technology, and is made up of 768 solar thermal collectors, with an output temperature of 393 °C (739 °F), transferred with Biphenyl and Diphenyl oxide heat transfer agents.

A second 50 MWe facility, Alvarado II, is currently on the proposal stage. It is planned to be constructed in the same area as Alvarado I.

== See also ==
- List of power stations in Spain
- List of solar thermal power stations
