= Planta Solar de Salamanca =

Photovoltaic power plant in Salamanca, Spain

- Country: Spain
- Coordinates: 41°01′47″N 5°51′10″W

Solar farm
- Type: Standard PV

Planta Solar de Salamanca is a 13.8 peak MW photovoltaic power plant located in Salamanca, Spain. The plant consists of approximately 70,000 Kyocera solar panels, occupying approximately 36-hectare (89-acre) site.

The plant was opened for operation on September 18, 2007.

== See also ==
- Photovoltaic power stations
