= Spex (solar park) =

Photovoltaic power stations in Spain

- Official name: Parque Solar Spex
- Country: Spain
- Location: Mérida
- Coordinates: 38°53′26″N 6°17′07″W
- Owners: Deutsche Bank ecoEnergías
- Operators: Solar Parks of Extremadura, S.L

Solar farm
- Type: Flat-panel PV
- Site area: 195 hectares (482 acres)

Power generation
- Nameplate capacity: 30 MW

The solar park "Spex" near Mérida in Spain's Extremadura provides 30 megawatts of solar power enough to supply 16,000 households. Deutsche Bank and ecoEnergías are the developers of the power plant. It was built for a cost of €250 million on a 195-hectare (480-acre) site and uses dual axis trackers. Each panel has an area of 130 m^{2}.

== See also ==
- Photovoltaic power stations
