= Fuente Álamo Solar Power Plant =

Photovoltaic power station in Fuente-Álamo, Murcia in Spain

- Official name: Planta Solar Fuente Álamo
- Country: Spain
- Location: Fuente-Álamo, Murcia
- Coordinates: 37°41′12″N 1°49′02″W
- Status: Operational
- Commission date: 2008
- Construction cost: €200 million
- Owner: FRV

Solar farm
- Type: PV

Power generation
- Nameplate capacity: 26 MW

Planta Solar Fuente Álamo is a photovoltaic power station in Fuente-Álamo, Murcia in Spain. It covers an area of 62 hectares (150 acres). The power station has a capacity of 26 megawatts and its annual output is 44 GWh, equivalent to supply electricity to 13,000 households.

The project was developed and constructed by Gestamp Solar. It was later acquired by FRV. The power station cost nearly €200 million and it was commissioned in 2008.

== See also ==
- Photovoltaic power station
