= La Magascona and Magasquila photovoltaic power stations =

Photovoltaic power stations

La Magascona photovoltaic power station
- Official name: Planta Solar La Magascona
- Country: Spain
- Location: La Magascona, Trujillo
- Coordinates: 39°26′03″N 5°56′20″W
- Status: Operational
- Commission date: July 2007
- Operator: FRV España

Solar farm
- Type: Flat-panel PV
- Site area: 100 ha (247 acres)

Power generation
- Nameplate capacity: 23.04 MW
- Annual net output: 46 GWh

Magasquila photovoltaic power station
- Official name: Planta Solar Magasquila
- Country: Spain
- Location: La Magascona, Trujillo
- Status: Operational
- Commission date: June 2008
- Operator: FRV España

Solar farm
- Type: Flat-panel PV
- Site area: 70 ha (173 acres)

Power generation
- Nameplate capacity: 11.52 MW

The La Magascona and Magasquila photovoltaic power stations (Spanish: Planta Solar La Magascona and Spanish: Planta Solar Magasquila) is a complex of photovoltaic power stations at La Magascona, Trujillo, in Cáceres, Spain. The La Magascona photovoltaic power station covers 100 hectares (250 acres) and has a peak output of 23.04 MW. The power station produces approximately 46 GWh of electricity per year. It was commissioned in July 2007.

The Magasquila photovoltaic power station covers 70 hectares (170 acres) and it has a peak output of 11.52 MW. It was commissioned in June 2008.
