= Dulcinea Solar Plant =

Power plant in Cuenca, Spain

- Country: Spain
- Location: Cuenca
- Coordinates: 39°39′30″N 2°48′11″W
- Status: Operational
- Commission date: 2009

Solar farm
- Type: Flat-panel PV

Power generation
- Nameplate capacity: 31.8 MW

The Dulcinea Solar Plant (Spanish: Planta Solar Dulcinea) is a photovoltaic power station in Cuenca, Spain. It consists of 300 photovoltaic generating units with a total capacity of 31.8 MW. The solar power station covers area of 230,324 m^{2} (2,479,186.9 ft^{2}). It is equipped with 82,896 Kyocera KC-200-GHT2 photovoltaic modules, 6,078 Kyocera KD-210-GHP2 modules, and 66,286 Suntech STP-210/18Ud modules. 6,600 strings of 24 photovoltaic panels linked in series 300 SMA SC100-Outdoor solar inverters. The estimated available radiation of 1,810 kWh/m2 per year is 1,497 peak sunlight hours.

== See also ==
- Photovoltaic power stations
