= Sanlúcar la Mayor =

- Municipality
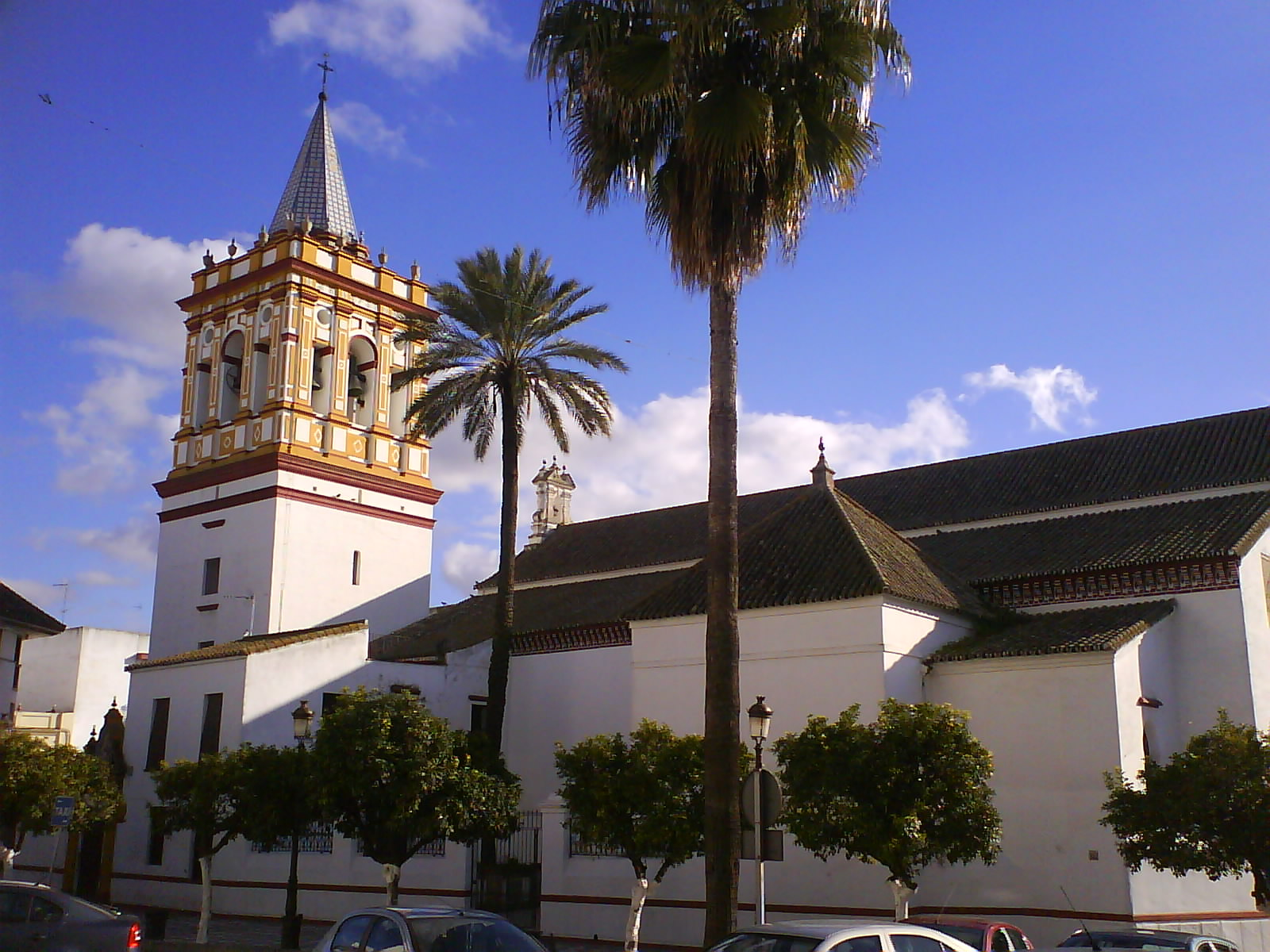
- Church of St. Mary

- Flag Coat of arms

- Location in Spain Sanlúcar la Mayor (Andalusia) Sanlúcar la Mayor (Spain)
- Coordinates: 37°22′59″N 6°12′00″W
- Country: Spain
- Autonomous community: Andalusia
- Province: Seville
- Comarca: El Aljarafe

Government
  - Mayor: Juan Antonio Naranjo Rioja (Alternativa por Sanlúcar)

Area
  - Total: 135.41 km^{2} (52.28 sq mi)
- Elevation: 148 m (486 ft)

Population (2025-01-01)
  - Total: 14,648
  - Density: 108.18/km^{2} (280.17/sq mi)
- Demonym: Sanluqueños
- Time zone: UTC+1 (CET)
  - Summer (DST): UTC+2 (CEST)
- Website: Official website

Sanlúcar la Mayor is a municipality in the province of Seville, southern Spain. The municipality is the location of the Solucar Complex.

Gaspar de Guzmán, Count of Olivares was created Duke of Sanlúcar la Mayor by Philip IV. He wished to retain his inherited title and so became known as el conde-duque.

== See also ==
- List of municipalities in Seville
