= Nanoparticle interfacial layer =

Interfacial layer of nanoparticles

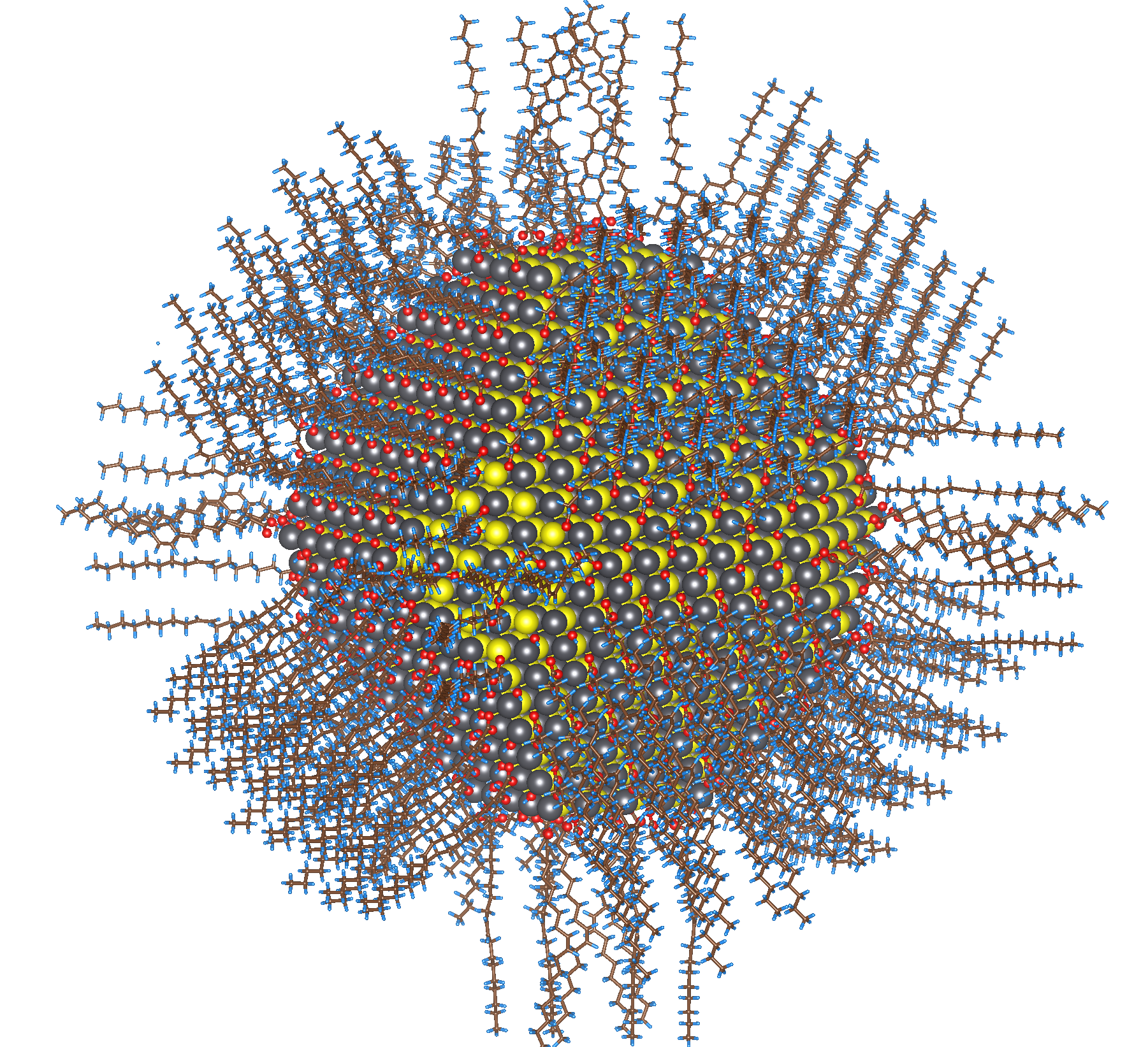
A lead sulfide nanoparticle surrounded by its interfacial layer.

A nanoparticle interfacial layer is a well structured layer of typically organic molecules around a nanoparticle. These molecules are known as stabilizers, capping and surface ligands or passivating agents. The interfacial layer has a significant effect on the properties of the nanoparticle and is therefore often considered as an integral part of a nanoparticle. The interfacial layer has a typical thickness between 0.1 and 4 nm, which is dependent on the type of the molecules the layer is made of. The organic molecules that make up the interfacial layer are often amphiphilic molecules, meaning that they have a polar head group combined with a non-polar tail.

== Interactions ==
The effect of the interfacial layer is clearly seen in the interactions between nanoparticles. These interactions can be modelled using the DLVO theory. Classically this theory states that the potential of a particle is the sum of the electrostatic and van der Waals interaction. This is theory has proven to be very accurate for almost all Colloidal particles, but cannot describe all the interactions measured for nanoparticles. Therefore this theory has been extended with the so called non-DLVO terms. In this extension the hydration force, hydrofobic force, steric force and bridging force are also considered, resulting in a total potential as follows:

$$V(r) = V_\text{vdw} + V_\text{el} + V_\text{HB} + V_\text{ST} + V_\text{B}$$

These last terms are mostly determined by the interfacial layer as this is the outermost part of the particle, thereby determining the surface interactions. For example, the bridging term only plays a role when the molecules in the interfacial layer tend to polymerize.

In the case of nanoparticles made of a crystal, quantum mechanical interactions would be expected, but due to the interfacial layer the cores cannot get close enough to each other, and therefore these interactions are neglectable.

An illustrative limit-case are non-charged semiconducting quantum dots (QD) in an ideal fluid. Due to the ideal fluid there is no difference between the QD–QD interaction and the QD–fluid interaction. For only the VDW interaction is of importance in the interaction between the interfacial layers, which are made of the superfluid, and other interfacial layers or the solvent. This means there is no attraction between the particles, so they can be accurately described using the Hard Sphere model.

== Optical properties ==
The organic ligands of the interfacial layer can influence the photoluminescence (PL) of a nanoparticle via various mechanisms, two of which are surface passivation and carrier trapping.

Surface passivation: At the surface of an uncovered nanoparticle (without an interfacial layer) dangling atoms are found. These bonds form energy levels between the HOMO–LUMO gap, thereby leading to non-radiative relaxation. Due to the binding of ligand molecules with the dangling orbitals, the energy of these states is shifted away from the HOMO-LUMO gap. This prevents nonradiative relaxation, and thus results in more PL. The strength of this effect strongly depends on the type of ligands. In general, small, linear ligands, do better than bulky ligands, because they lead to a higher surface coverage density, therefore allowing more dangling orbitals to be passivated.

Another surface effect is carrier trapping. Here the ligands can scavenge the electron(holes) in the nanoparticle, thereby precluding radiative recombination and thus leading towards a reduction in PL. A well-known example of such ligands are thiols.

The light conversion efficiency can also be improved using an interfacial layer that exists of compounds that absorb in a wider energy range and emit at the absorption energy of the nanoparticle. According to C. S. Inagaki et al the absorption band of a metallic nanoparticle was shown to drastically increase in width, caused by the overlap of transitions in the interfacial layer and the plasmon resonance band of the nanoparticle. This phenomenon can be used in practical applications like LED's and solar cells. In these technologies either the efficiency of absorption or emission is of critical importance and nanoparticles with an interfacial layer could be used to improve this efficiency by either absorbing or emitting at a wider range of energies.

== Plasmon resonance ==
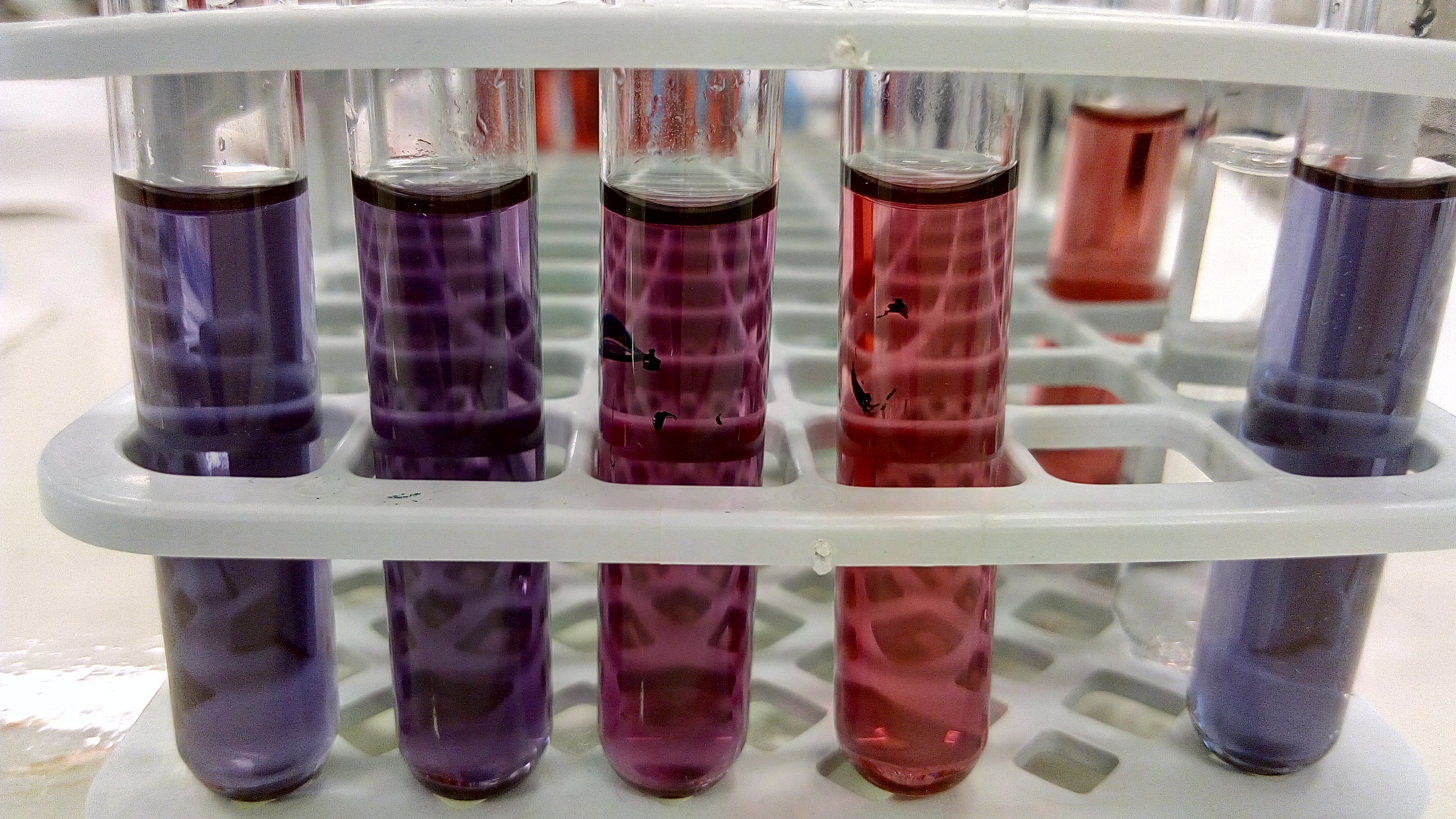
Effect of different concentrations of glutathione in the interfacial layer of gold nanoparticles on the colour of the solution.

The plasmon resonance displayed by nanoparticles, gold particles are most often used as an example, can be altered using the interfacial layer. When either anionic or cationic ligands bound to a nanoparticle made of gold for example are increased in length, the wavelength of the plasmon resonance will shift to red.

An example of another effect, that has recently been observed by Amendola et al. on small gold nanoparticles, of 10 nm or less, is that dense monolayers that consist of certain specific short chain ligands tend to dampen the surface plasmon resonance effects.

Plasmon resonance can be used to analyze the surfactants of the nanoparticle. This principle is based on the so-called Fröhlich condition which states that the refractive index of the surrounding medium of a nanoparticle can be used to tune or alter the frequency of the surface plasmon resonance. The equation that relates both properties is as follows:

$$\lambda_{max} = \frac{2 \pi c}{\omega_p} \sqrt{2n_m^2 +1}$$

In which $\lambda_{max}$ is the wavelength at which the plasmon resonance frequency peaks, $n_m$ is the refractive index of the environment, which relates to the dielectric constant of the medium $\epsilon_m$as follows: $n_m = \sqrt{\epsilon_m}$. Furthermore $\omega_p$ is the frequency of the plasmon resonance and $c$ is the speed of light in vacuum. The relation between the wavelength and the refractive index of the environment is not strictly linear but for small values of $n$ the theoretical predictions align with experimental results. This relation can thus be used to analyse the environment of the nanoparticle, i.e. the interfacial layer, by measuring the wavelength of the plasmon resonance.

== Thermal conductivity ==
The thermal conductivity is a measure of the capacity of a material to conduct heat. In a nanofluid this conductivity is influenced by the nanoparticles suspended in the solution. A simple model only considered the thermal conductivity of the liquid and the suspended solids. This is called the Maxwell–Garnett model (1891) and is defined as:

$$\frac{k_\text{eff}}{k_\text{f}} = \frac{k_\text{p} + 2k_\text{f} - 2\phi(k_\text{f} - k_\text{p})}{k_\text{p} + 2k_\text{f} + \phi(k_\text{f} - k_\text{p})}$$

In which $k_\text{eff}$, $k_\text{f}$, $k_\text{p}$ are respectively the effective thermal conductivity, the thermal conductivity of the fluid and the thermal conductivity of particle and $\phi$ is the packing fraction of the particles. This model is not very accurate for nanoparticles for it does not take into account the interfacial layer formed by the fluid around a nanoparticle.

In 2006 K. C. Leong et al proposed a new model, one which took into account the existence of an interfacial layer. They did so by considering the area around a nanoparticle and stating it exists of three separate regions. Each of them with a specific but different thermal conductivity. This resulted in the following model:

$$k_\text{eff} = \frac{(k_p - k_\text{lr})\phi_\text{l}k_\text{lr}[2\beta_l^3 - \beta^3 + 1] + (k_\text{p} + 2k_\text{lr}) \beta_\text{l}^3[\phi_\text{l}\beta^3(k_\text{lr}-k_\text{f}) + k_\text{f}]}{\beta_\text{l}^3(k_\text{p} + 2k_\text{lr} - (k_\text{p} - k_\text{lr})\phi_\text{l}[\beta_\text{l}^3 + \beta^3 - 1])}$$

In which $k_\text{eff}$ is the effective thermal conductivity, $k_\text{p}$, $k_\text{f}$ and $k_\text{lr}$ the thermal conductivity of respectively the particle, the fluid and the interfacial layer. $\phi_\text{l}$ is the packing fraction of the fluid or $1-\phi_\text{p}\beta$. And $\beta$ and $\beta_\text{l}$ are respectively $1+\gamma$ and $1+\gamma/2$, with $\gamma = h/a$ or the ratio of the thickness of the interfacial layer to the particle size. This model was shown to be more in agreement with the experimental results, but is limited in its applicability for there is not yet a theoretical way to establish the thermal conductivity, or the thickness of this layer.

== Solubility ==
Another property of nanoparticles that is heavily influenced by the surfactants is the solubility of the nanoparticle. One can imagine that a metallic nanoparticle would not dissolve well in organic solvents. By adding the surfactants the nanoparticles will stay more evenly dispersed throughout the solvent. This is due to the, often, amphiphilic nature of the surfactants. The interfacial layer can be used to essentially tune the solubility of nanoparticles in different media, which can range from extremely hydrophilic to hydrophobic.

== Stability ==
The stability of a nanoparticle is a term often used to describe the preservation of a specific, usually size-dependent, property of the particle. It can refer to e.g.: its size, shape, composition, crystalline structure, surface properties or dispersion within a solution. The interfacial layer of a nanoparticle can aid these types of stabilities in different ways.

The ligands can bind to the different facets of a nanoparticle, the size and type of which will determine the way the ligands will be ordered. The way the ligands are attached to the particle, ordered disordered or somewhere in between, plays a crucial role in the way different particles will interact. This in turn affects the reactivity of the nanoparticle, which is another way to look at the stability of the particle.

== Analysis ==
A wide variety of techniques can be used to analyze the interfacial layer, often SAXS, NMR, AFM, STM are used, but other methods, like measuring the refractive index can reveal information as well.

Small-angle X-ray diffraction provides data about the size and dispersion of the nanoparticles, and gives information about the density of the interfacial layer. Because the amount of scattering is proportionate with the density. On top of this the thickness of the layer can be estimated. However a disadvantage is that SAXS is destructive.

AFM and STM measurements can reveal information at atomic resolution about the structure and shape of the interfacial layer. This information is limited to the surface of the nanoparticle, as you can only probe the surface. Another drawback of STM is that it's only applicable if the interfacial layer is conducting.

(Solid-state) NMR can be used to study the composition, short range ordering and dynamics in the interfacial layer. The dynamics can be studied over a wide range of timescales, which allows the intermolecular interactions, chemical reactions and transport phenomena to be analyzed.
