= Solar-assisted heat pump =

Type of heating system

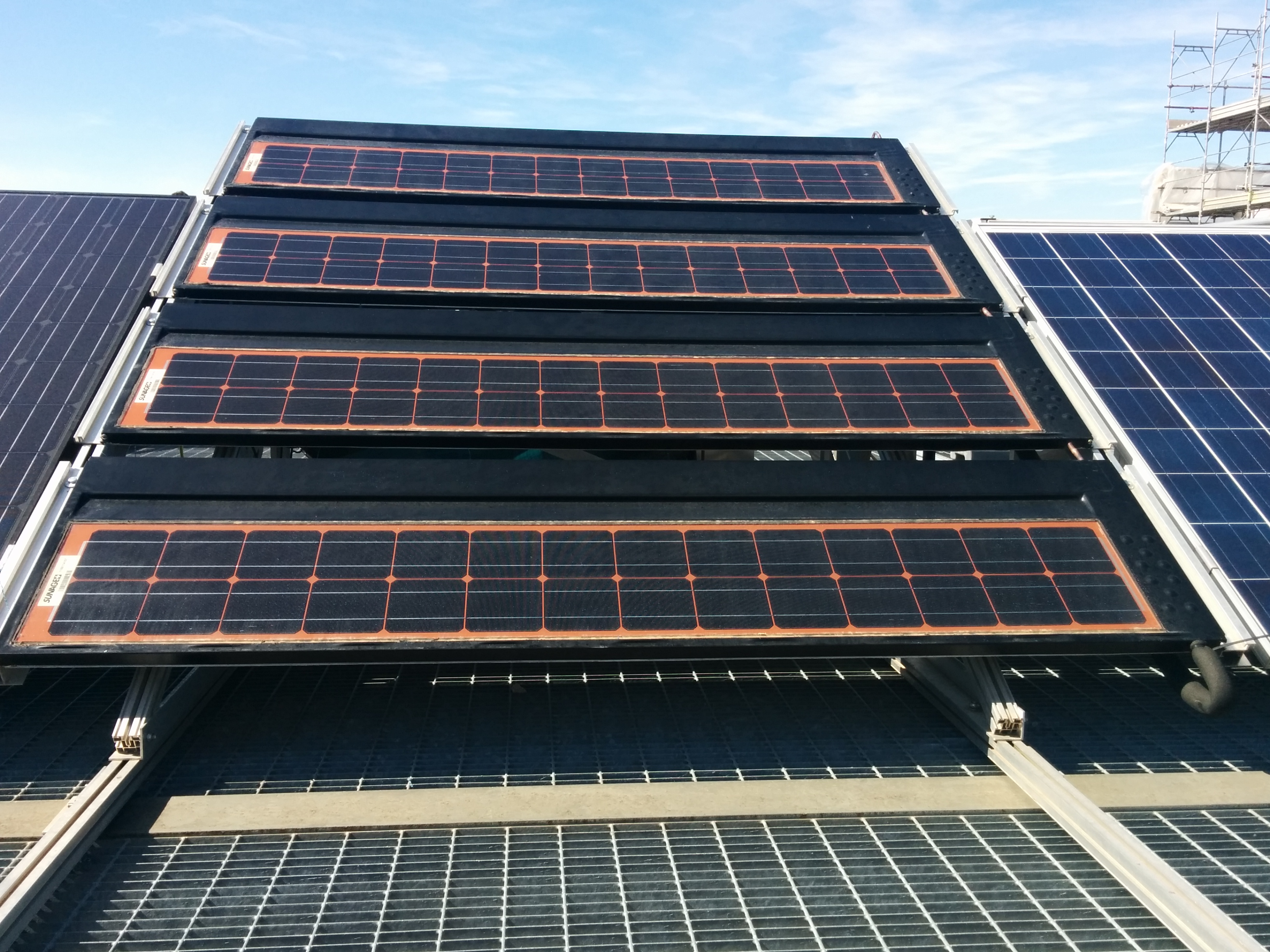
Hybrid photovoltaic-thermal solar panels of a SAHP in an experimental installation at Department of Energy at Polytechnic of Milan

A solar-assisted heat pump (SAHP) is a system that combines a heat pump and thermal solar panels and/or PV solar panels in a single integrated system. Heat pumps require a low temperature heat source, which can be provided by solar energy. Typically, these two technologies are used separately (or only placing them in parallel) to produce warm air or hot water. In this system the solar thermal panel acts as the low temperature heat source, and the heat produced feeds the heat pump's evaporator. The goal of this system is to get high coefficient of performance (COP) and then produce energy in a more efficient and less expensive way. Air source heat pumps, which are preheated by solar air collectors, have an additional benefit of lower maintenance as the outside fan unit can be protected from the harsh winter environment.

Solar PV energy can power the heat pump electrically to enable electrification of heating buildings and greenhouses. These systems enable electrification of heating/cooling and are normally driven by economics and decarbonization goals. Such systems have been shown to be economic in the Middle East, North America, Asia and Europe.

It is possible to use any type of solar thermal system with air or liquid collectors, (sheet and tubes, roll-bond, heat pipe, thermal plates) or hybrid (mono/polycrystalline, thin film) in combination with the heat pump. Using hybrid panels, however, is most preferred because it allows covering a part of the electricity demand of the heat pump and reduces the power consumption and consequently the variable costs of the system.

== Optimization ==
Solar air collectors operate at maximum efficiency when heating ambient air and thus are ideal for supplying warm air to air source heat pumps. For solar liquid based systems the operating conditions' optimization of this system is the main challenge, because there are two opposing trends of the performance of the two sub-systems: by way of example, decreasing the evaporation temperature of the working fluid increases the thermal efficiency of the solar panel but decreases the performance of the heat pump, and consequently the COP. The target for the optimization is normally the minimization of the electrical consumption of the heat pump, or primary energy required by an auxiliary boiler which supplies the load not covered by a renewable source. For PV powered heat pump systems the goal is still to reduce grid-power, but there is an additional optimization to maximize self-sufficiency and self-consumption of PV and the energy imported/exported to the grid. Best practices have been developed to model PV-powered heat pumps that can be done with a range of open source software tools like TRNSYS, EnergyPlus and System Advisory Model (SAM).

== Configurations ==
Solar heated air source heat pumps are relatively simple to implement by connecting the outlet of the solar air collectors to the fan inlet of the heat pump. For liquid solar collectors, there are two possible configurations with heat pumps, which are distinguished by the presence or not of an intermediate fluid that transports the heat from the panel to the heat pump. Machines called indirect-expansion mainly use water as a heat transfer fluid, mixed with an antifreeze fluid (usually glycol) to avoid ice formation during winter. The machines called direct-expansion place the refrigerant fluid directly inside the hydraulic circuit of the thermal panel, where the phase transition takes place. This second configuration, even though it is more complex from a technical point of view, has several advantages:

- a better transfer of the heat produced by the thermal panel to the working fluid, which involves a greater thermal efficiency of the evaporator, linked to the absence of an intermediate fluid;
- presence of an evaporating fluid allows a uniform temperature distribution in the thermal panel with a consequent increase in the thermal efficiency (in normal operating conditions of the solar panel, the local thermal efficiency decreases from inlet to outlet of the fluid because the fluid temperature increases);
- using hybrid solar panel, in addition to the advantage described in the previous point, the electrical efficiency of the panel increases (for similar considerations).

== Comparison ==
Generally speaking the use of this integrated system is an efficient way to employ the heat produced by the thermal panels in winter period, something that normally would not be exploited because its temperature is too low.

=== Separated production systems ===
In comparison with only heat pump utilization, it is possible to reduce the amount of electrical energy consumed by the machine during the weather evolution from winter season to the spring, and then finally only use thermal solar panels to produce all the heat demand required (only in case of indirect-expansion machine), thus saving on variable costs.

In comparison with a system with only thermal panels, it is possible to provide a greater part of the required winter heating using a non-fossil energy source.

=== Traditional heat pumps ===
Compared to geothermal heat pumps, the main advantage is that the installation of a piping field in the soil is not required, which results in a lower cost of investment (drilling accounts for about 50% of the cost of a geothermal heat pump system) and in more flexibility of machine installation, even in areas in which there is limited available space. Furthermore, there are no risks related to possible thermal soil impoverishment.

Similarly to air source heat pumps, solar-assisted heat pump performance is affected by atmospheric conditions, although this effect is less significant. Solar-assisted heat pump performance is generally affected by varying solar radiation intensity rather than air temperature oscillation. This produces a greater SCOP (Seasonal COP). Additionally, the evaporation temperature of the working fluid is higher than in air source heat pumps, so in general, the coefficient of performance is significantly higher.

== Low temperature conditions ==
In general, a heat pump can evaporate at temperatures below the ambient temperature. In a solar-assisted heat pump, this generates a temperature distribution of the thermal panels below that temperature. In this condition, thermal losses of the panels towards the environment become additional available energy to the heat pump. In this case it is possible that the thermal efficiency of solar panels is more than 100%.

Another free-contribution in these conditions of low temperature is related to the possibility of condensation of water vapor on the surface of the panels, which provides additional heat to the heat transfer fluid (normally it is a small part of the total heat collected by solar panels), that is equal to the latent heat of condensation.

== Heat pump with double cold sources ==
The simple configuration of solar-assisted heat pump as only solar panels as heat source for the evaporator. It can also exist a configuration with an additional heat source. The goal is to have further advantages in energy saving but, on the other hand, the management and optimization of the system become more complex.

The geothermal-solar configuration allows reducing the size of the piping field (and reduce the investment) and to have a regeneration of the ground during summer through the heat collected from the thermal panels. This configuration is also known as solar assisted ground source heat pump (SAGSHP). A well specified and well designed SAGSHP system can achieve energy neutral buildings [on an annual basis] as far north as Karlskrona in Sweden.

The air-solar structure allows an acceptable heat input also during cloudy days, maintaining the compactness of the system and the easiness to install it.

== Challenges ==
As in regular air conditioners, one of the issues is to keep the evaporation temperature high, especially when the sunlight has low power and the ambient airflow is low.

== See also ==
- Renewable energy
- Renewable heat
- Heat pump
- Geothermal heat pump
- Refrigeration cycle
- Solar panel
- Photovoltaic thermal hybrid solar collector
- Solar thermal collector
- Energy conversion efficiency
