= Photovoltaic thermal hybrid solar collector =

Solar energy technology

Schematic cross section of an uncovered PVT collector with sheet-and-tube type heat exchanger and rear insulation: 1 – Anti-reflective coating 2 – Encapsulant (e.g. EVA) 3 – Solar PV cells 4 – Encapsulant (e.g. EVA) 5 – Backsheet (e.g. PVF) 6 – Heat exchanger (e.g. aluminum, copper or polymers) 7 – Thermal insulation (e.g. mineral wool, polyurethane)

Photovoltaic thermal collectors, typically abbreviated as PVT collectors and also known as hybrid solar collectors, photovoltaic thermal solar collectors, PV/T collectors or solar cogeneration systems, are power generation technologies that convert solar radiation into usable thermal and electrical energy. PVT collectors combine photovoltaic solar cells (often arranged in solar panels), which convert sunlight into electricity, with a solar thermal collector, which transfers the otherwise unused waste heat from the PV module to a heat transfer fluid. By combining electricity and heat generation within the same component, these technologies can reach a higher overall efficiency than solar photovoltaic (PV) or solar thermal (T) alone.

Research has gone into developing a diverse range of PVT technologies since the 1970s. The different PVT collector technologies differ in their collector design and heat transfer fluid and address applications ranging from low temperature heat below ambient up to high temperature heat above 100 °C.

== PVT markets ==
PVT collectors generate solar heat and electricity basically free of direct CO_{2} emissions and are therefore a green technology that can supply renewable electricity and heat to buildings and industrial processes.

Heat is the largest energy end-use. In 2015, the provision of heating for use in buildings, industrial purposes and other applications accounted for approximately 52% (205 EJ) of the total energy consumed. Of this, over half was used in the industry and around 46% in the building sector. While 72% of the heat was provided by the direct combustion of fossil fuels, only 7% was from modern renewables such as solar thermal, biofuel or geothermal energy. The low-grade heat market up to 150 °C is estimated to be 26.8% of the worldwide final energy demand, which is currently serviced by fossil fuels (gas, oil, and coal), electricity and renewable heat. This is the sum of industry demand 7.1% (25.5 EJ) and building demand 19.7% (49.0 EJ residential and 13.6 EJ commercial).

The electricity demand in buildings and industry is expected to grow further due to ongoing electrification and sector coupling. For a significant reduction of greenhouse gas emissions, it is essential that the major share of electricity is sourced from renewable energy sources, such as wind power, solar energy, biomass and water power.

The market for renewable heat and electricity is therefore vast, illustrating the market potential of PVT collectors.

The report "Solar Heat Worldwide" assessed the global market of PVT collectors in 2019. According to the authors, the total area of installed collectors was 1.16 million square meters. Uncovered water collectors had the largest market share (55%), followed by air collectors (43%) and covered water collectors (2%). The country with the largest installed capacity was France (42%), followed by South Korea (24%), China (11%) and Germany (10%).

== PVT collector technology ==
PVT collectors combine the generation of solar electricity and heat in a single component, and thus achieve a higher overall efficiency and better utilization of the solar spectrum than conventional PV modules.

Utilization of solar spectrum of a PVT collector

Photovoltaic cells typically reach an electrical efficiency between 15% and 20%, while the largest share of the solar spectrum (65% – 70%) is converted into heat, increasing the temperature of PV modules. PVT collectors, on the contrary, are engineered to transfer heat from the PV cells to a fluid, thereby cooling the cells and thus improving their efficiency. In this way, this excess heat is made useful and can be utilized to heat water or as a low temperature source for heat pumps, for example. Thus, PVT collectors make better use of the solar spectrum.

Most photovoltaic cells (e.g. silicon based) suffer from a drop in efficiency with increased cell temperatures. Each Kelvin of increased cell temperature reduces the efficiency by 0.2–0.5%. Therefore, heat removal from the PV cells can lower their temperature and thus increase the cells' efficiency. Improved PV cell lifetimes are another benefit of lower operation temperatures.

This is an effective method to maximize total system efficiency and reliability, but causes the thermal component to under-perform as compared to that achievable with a pure solar thermal collector. That is to say, the maximum operating temperatures for most PVT system are limited to less than the maximum cell temperature (typically below 100 °C). Nevertheless, two or more units of heat energy are still generated for each unit of electrical energy, depending on cell efficiency and system design.

=== Types of PVT collectors ===
There are a multitude of technical possibilities to combine PV cells and solar thermal collectors. A number of PVT collectors are available as commercial products, which can be divided into the following categories according to their basic design and heat transfer fluid:

- PVT liquid collector
- PVT air collector

In addition to the classification by heat transfer fluid, PVT collectors can also be categorized according to the presence of a secondary glazing to reduce heat losses and the presence of a device to concentrate solar irradiation:

- Uncovered PVT collector (WISC PVT)
- Covered PVT collector
- Concentrating PVT collector (CPVT)

Moreover, PVT collectors can be classified according to their design, such as cell technology, type of fluid, heat exchanger material and geometry, type of contact between fluid and PV module, fixation of heat exchanger, or level of building integration (building integrated PVT (BIPVT) collectors).

The design and type of PVT collectors always implies a certain adaption to operating temperatures, applications, and giving priority to either heat or electricity generation. For instance, operating the PVT collector at low temperatures leads to a cooling effect of PV cells compared to PV modules and therefore results in an increase of electric power. However, the heat also has to be utilized at low temperatures.

The maximum operating temperatures for most PV modules are limited to less than the maximum certified operation temperatures (typically 85 °C). Nevertheless, two or more units of thermal energy are generated for each unit of electrical energy, depending on cell efficiency and system design.

=== PVT liquid collector ===
The basic water-cooled design uses channels to direct fluid flow using piping attached directly or indirectly to the back of a PV module. In a standard fluid-based system, a working fluid, typically water, glycol or mineral oil circulates in the heat exchanger behind the PV cells. The heat from the PV cells is conducted through the metal and absorbed by the working fluid (presuming that the working fluid is cooler than the operating temperature of the cells).

=== PVT air collector ===
The basic air-cooled design uses either a hollow, conductive housing to mount the photovoltaic panels or a controlled flow of air to the rear face of the PV panel. PVT air collectors either draw in fresh outside air or use air as a circulating heat transfer medium in a closed loop. Heat is radiated from the panels into the enclosed space, where the air is either circulated into a building HVAC system to recapture heat energy, or rises and is vented from the top of the structure. The heat transfer capability of air is lower than that of typically used liquids and therefore requires a proportionally higher mass flow rate than an equivalent PVT liquid collector. The advantage is that the infrastructure required has lower cost and complexity.

The heated air is circulated into a building HVAC system to deliver thermal energy. Excess heat generated can be simply vented to the atmosphere. Some versions of the PVT air collector can be operated in a way to cool the PV panels to generate more electricity and assist with reducing thermal effects on lifetime performance degradation.

A number of different configurations of PVT air collectors exist, which vary in engineering sophistication. PVT air collector configurations range from a basic enclosed shallow metal box with an intake and exhaust up to optimized heat transfer surfaces that achieve uniform panel heat transfer across a wide range of process and ambient conditions.

PVT air collectors can be carried out as uncovered or covered designs.

=== Uncovered PVT collector (WISC) ===
Uncovered PVT collectors, also denoted as unglazed or wind and/or infrared sensitive PVT collectors (WISC), typically consist of a PV module with a heat exchanger structure attached to the back of the PV module. Despite their name, the solar cells are generally attached to the back side of a front glass and thus covered by it, but without an air gap. While most PVT collectors are prefabricated units, some products are offered as heat exchangers to be retrofitted to off-the-shelf PV modules. In both cases, a good and longtime durable thermal contact with a high heat transfer coefficient between the PV cells and the fluid is essential.

The rear side of the uncovered PVT collector can be equipped with thermal insulation (e.g. mineral wool or foam) to reduce heat losses of the heated fluid. Uninsulated PVT collectors are beneficial for operation near and below ambient temperatures. Particularly uncovered PVT collectors with increased heat transfer to ambient air are a suitable heat source for heat pump systems. When the temperature in the heat pump's source is lower than the ambient, the fluid can be heated up to ambient temperature even in periods without sunshine.

Accordingly, uncovered PVT collectors can be categorized into:

- Uncovered PVT collector with increased heat transfer to ambient air
- Uncovered PVT collector without rear insulation
- Uncovered PVT collector with rear insulation

Uncovered PVT collectors are also used to provide renewable cooling by dissipating heat via the PVT collector to the ambient air or by utilizing the radiative cooling effect. In doing so, cold air or water is harnessed, which can be utilized for HVAC applications.

=== Covered PVT collector ===
Covered, or glazed PVT collectors, feature an additional glazing, which encloses an insulating air layer between the PV module and the secondary glazing. This reduces heat losses and increases the thermal efficiency. Moreover, covered PVT collectors can reach significantly higher temperatures than PV modules or uncovered PVT collectors. The operating temperatures mostly depend on the temperature of the working fluid. The average fluid temperature can be between 25 °C in swimming pool applications to 90 °C in solar cooling systems.

Covered PVT collectors resemble the form and design of conventional flat plate collectors or evacuated vacuum tubes. Yet, PV cells instead of spectrally-selective absorber coatings absorb the incident solar irradiance and generate an electrical current in addition to solar heat.

The insulating characteristics of the front cover increase the thermal efficiency and allow for higher operating temperatures. However, the additional optical interfaces increase optical reflections and thus reduce the generated electrical power. Anti-reflective coatings on the front glazing can reduce the additional optical losses.

=== PVT concentrator (CPVT) ===
A concentrator system has the advantage to reduce the amount of PV cells needed. Therefore, it is possible to use more expensive and efficient PV cells, e.g. multi-junction photovoltaic cell. The concentration of sunlight also reduces the amount of hot PV-absorber area and therefore reduces heat losses to the ambient, which improves significantly the efficiency for higher application temperatures.

Concentrator systems also often require reliable control systems to accurately track the Sun and to protect the PV cells from damaging over-temperature conditions. However, there are also stationery PVT collector types that use nonimaging reflectors, such as the Compound Parabolic Concentrator (CPC), and do not have to track the Sun.

Under ideal conditions, about 75% of the Sun's power directly incident upon such systems can be gathered as electricity and heat at temperatures up to 160 °C. CPVT units that are coupled with thermal energy storage and organic Rankine cycle generators can provide on-demand recovery of up to 70% of their instantaneous electricity generation, and may thus be a fairly efficient alternative to the types of electrical storage which are joined with traditional PV systems.

A limitation of high-concentrator (i.e. HCPV and HCPVT) systems is that they maintain their long-term advantages over conventional c-Si/mc-Si collectors only in regions that remain consistently free of atmospheric aerosol contaminants (e.g. light clouds, smog, etc.). Power production is rapidly degraded because 1) radiation is reflected and scattered outside of the small (often less than 1–2 °) acceptance angle of the collection optics, and 2) absorption of specific components of the solar spectrum causes one or more series junctions within the multi-junction cells to under-perform. The short-term impacts of such power generation irregularities can be reduced to some degree with inclusion of electrical and thermal storage in the system.

== PVT applications ==
The range of applications of PVT collectors, and in general solar thermal collectors, can be divided according to their temperature levels:

Map of PVT collector technologies and PVT applications per operating temperature

- low temperature applications up to 50 °C
- medium temperature applications up to 80 °C
- high temperature applications above 80 °C

Accordingly, PVT collector technologies can be clustered with respect to their temperature levels: the suitability per temperature range depends on the PVT collector design and technology. Therefore, each PVT collector technology features different optimal temperature ranges. The operating temperature ultimately defines which type of PVT collector is suitable for which application.

Low temperature applications include heat pump systems and heating swimming pools or spas up to 50 °C. PVT collectors in heat pump systems act either as low temperature source for the heat pump evaporator or on the load side to supply medium temperature heat to a storage tank. Moreover, regeneration of boreholes and ground source heat exchangers is possible. Uncovered PVT collectors with enhanced air-to-water heat exchange can even be the only source of a heat pump system. In combination with a system architecture allowing to store cold produced with WISC or air collectors also air conditioning is possible.

Low and medium temperature applications for space heating and water heating are found in buildings, with temperatures from 20 °C to 80 °C. The temperatures of the specific system depend on the requirements of the heat supply system for domestic hot water (e.g. freshwater station, temperature requirements for legionella prevention) and for space heating (e.g. underfloor heating, radiators). Moreover, the PVT collector array can be dimensioned to cover only smaller fractions of the heat demand (e.g. hot water pre-heating), thus reducing operating temperatures of the PVT collector.

Solar process heat includes a diverse range of industrial applications with low to high temperature requirements (e.g. solar water desalination, solar cooling, or power generation with concentrating PVT collectors).

Depending on the type of heat transfer fluid, PVT collector technologies are suited for several applications:

- PVT air collector: space heating systems, agricultural processes (e.g. drying crops);
- PVT liquid collector: Space heating (domestic, industrial), water heating systems, water desalination, space cooling, food processing systems.

PVT technologies can bring a valuable contribution to the world's energy mix and can be considered as an option for applications delivering renewable electricity, heat or cold.

== See also ==
- Solar air conditioning
- Photovoltaic system
- Solar Energy
