= Nanofluids in solar collectors =

Nanofluid-based direct solar collectors are solar thermal collectors where nanoparticles in a liquid medium can scatter and absorb solar radiation. They have recently received interest to efficiently distribute solar energy. Nanofluid-based solar collector have the potential to harness solar radiant energy more efficiently compared to conventional solar collectors. Nanofluids have recently found relevance in applications requiring quick and effective heat transfer such as industrial applications, cooling of microchips, microscopic fluidic applications, etc. Moreover, in contrast to conventional heat transfer (for solar thermal applications) like water, ethylene glycol, and molten salts, nanofluids are not transparent to solar radiant energy; instead, they absorb and scatter significantly the solar irradiance passing through them. Typical solar collectors use a black-surface absorber to collect the sun's heat energy which is then transferred to a fluid running in tubes embedded within. Various limitations have been discovered with these configuration and alternative concepts have been addressed. Among these, the use of nanoparticles suspended in a liquid is the subject of research. Nanoparticle materials including aluminium, copper, carbon nanotubes and carbon-nanohorns have been added to different base fluids and characterized in terms of their performance for improving heat transfer efficiency.

== Background ==
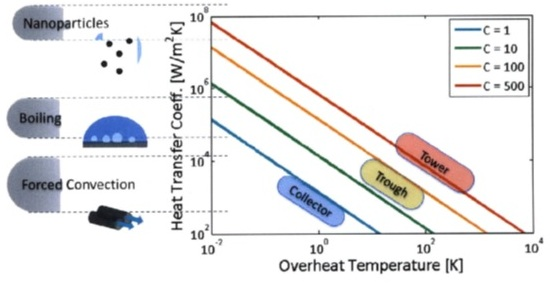
Fig 2 : Comparison of heat transfer coefficients

Dispersing trace amounts of nanoparticles into common base fluids has a significant impact on the optical as well as thermo physical properties of base fluid, mainly increasing the thermal conductivity. This characteristic can be used to effectively capture and transport solar radiation. Enhancement of the solar irradiance absorption capacity leads to a higher heat transfer resulting in more efficient heat transfer as shown in figure 2. The efficiency of a solar thermal system is reliant on several energy conversion steps, which are in turn governed by the effectiveness of the heat transfer processes. While higher conversion efficiency of solar to thermal energy is possible, the key components that need to be improved are the solar collector. An ideal solar collector will absorb the concentrated solar radiation, convert partially that incident solar radiation into heat and transfer the heat to the heat transfer fluid. Higher the heat transfer rate to the fluid leads to higher outlet temperature and higher temperatures leads to improved conversion efficiency in the power cycle. nanoparticles have several orders of magnitude higher heat transfer coefficient when transferring heat immediately to the surrounding fluid. This is simply due to the small size of nanoparticle.

== Mechanism for enhanced thermal conductivity of nanofluids ==
Keblinski et al. had named four main possible mechanisms for the anomalous increase in nanofluids heat transfer which are :

=== Brownian motion of nanoparticles ===
Due to Brownian motion particles randomly move through the liquid. And hence better transport of heat. Although it was originally believed that the fluid motions resulting from Brownian motion of the nanoparticles could explain the enhancement in heat transfer properties, this hypothesis was later rejected.

=== Liquid layering at liquid/particle interface ===
Liquid molecules can form a layer around the solid particles and there by enhance the local ordering of the atomic structure at the interface region.hence, the atomic structure of such liquid layer is more ordered than that of the bulk liquid.

=== Effect of nano-particles clustering ===
The effective volume of a cluster is considered much larger than the volume of the particles due to the lower packing fraction of the cluster. Since, heat can be transferred rapidly within the such clusters, the volume fraction of the highly conductive phase is larger than the volume of solid, thus increasing its thermal conductivity

== Comparison ==
In the last ten years, many experiments have been conducted numerically and analytically to validate the importance of nanofluids.

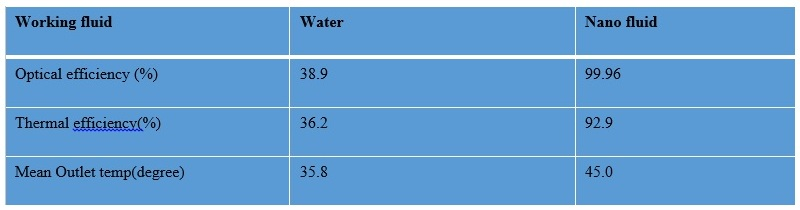
Table 1 :Comparison of Conventional fluids and Nano fluids

From the table 1 it is clear that nanofluid-based collector have a higher efficiency than a conventional collector. So, it is clear that we can improve conventional collector simply by adding trace amounts of nano-particles. It has also been observed through numerical simulation that mean outlet temperature increase by increasing volume fraction of nanoparticles, length of tube and decreases by decreasing velocity.

== Benefits of use of nanofluids in solar collectors ==
Nanofluids poses the following advantages as compared to conventional fluids which makes them suitable for use in solar collectors:

- Absorption of solar energy will be maximized with change of the size, shape, material and volume fraction of the nanoparticles.
- The suspended nanoparticles increase the surface area but decrease the heat capacity of the fluid due to the very small particle size.
- The suspended nanoparticles enhance the thermal conductivity which results improvement in efficiency of heat transfer systems.
- Properties of fluid can be changed by varying concentration of nanoparticles.
- Extremely small size of nanoparticles ideally allows them to pass through pumps.
- Nanofluid can be optically selective (high absorption in the solar range and low emittance in the infrared.

The fundamental difference between the conventional and nanofluid-based collector lies in the mode of heating of the working fluid. In the former case the sunlight is absorbed by a surface, where as in the latter case the sunlight is directly absorbed by the working fluid (through radiative transfer). On reaching the receiver the solar radiations transfer energy to the nanofluid via scattering and absorption.

== See also ==
- Nanofluid
- Absorption
- Fluid
- Radiation
- Scattering
- Solar collector
- Solar energy
