= Solar thermal collector =

Device that collects heat

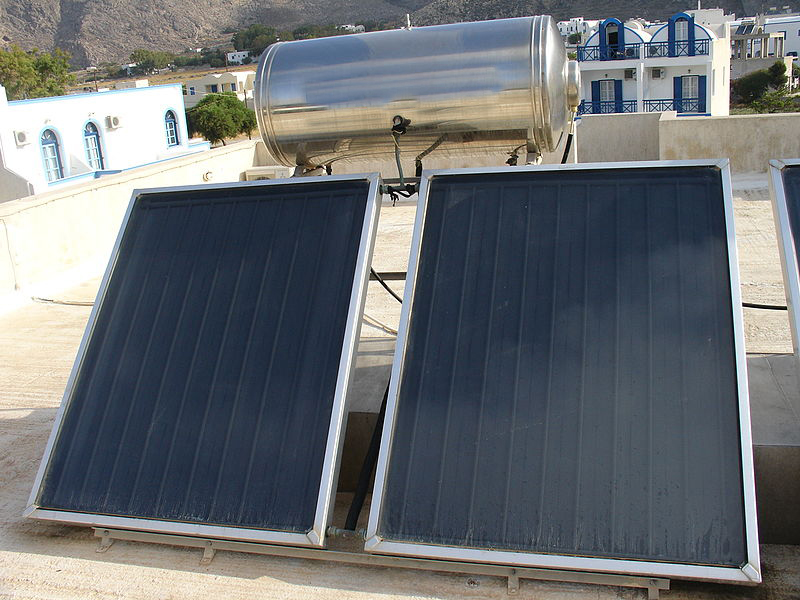
Water heating system deployed on a flat roof. The pipes that carry the heat away can be seen embedded in the absorber, a flat plate painted black. In this example the heat is stored in the tank above the panels.

A solar thermal collector collects heat by absorbing sunlight. The term "solar collector" commonly refers to a device for solar hot water heating, but may also refer to large power generating installations such as solar parabolic troughs and solar towers, or to non-water-heating devices such as solar cookers or solar air heaters.

Solar thermal collectors are either non-concentrating or concentrating. In non-concentrating collectors, the aperture area (i.e., the area that receives the solar radiation) is roughly the same as the absorber area (i.e., the area absorbing the radiation). A common example of such a system is a metal plate that is painted a dark color to maximize the absorption of sunlight. The energy is then collected by cooling the plate with a working fluid, often water or glycol running in pipes attached to the plate.

Concentrating collectors have a much larger aperture than the absorber area. The aperture is typically in the form of a mirror that is focussed on the absorber, which in most cases are the pipes carrying the working fluid. Since the sun moves through the sky during the day, concentrating collectors often require some form of solar tracking system, and are sometimes referred to as "active" collectors for this reason.

Non-concentrating collectors are typically used in residential, industrial and commercial buildings for space heating, while concentrating collectors in concentrated solar power plants generate electricity by heating a heat-transfer fluid to drive a turbine connected to an electrical generator.

== Heating water ==
Flat-plate and evacuated-tube solar collectors are mainly used to collect heat for space heating, domestic hot water, or cooling with an absorption chiller. In contrast to solar hot water panels, they use a circulating fluid to displace heat to a separated reservoir. The first solar thermal collector designed for building roofs was patented by William H. Goettl and called the "Solar heat collector and radiator for building roof".

Evacuated flat-plate solar collectors are a more recent innovation and can be used for Solar Heat for Industrial Cooling (SHIC) and Solar Air Conditioning (SAC), where temperature in excess of 100 °C (212 °F) are required. These non-concentrating collectors harvest both diffuse and direct light and can make use of steam instead of water as fluid.

=== Flat plate collectors ===
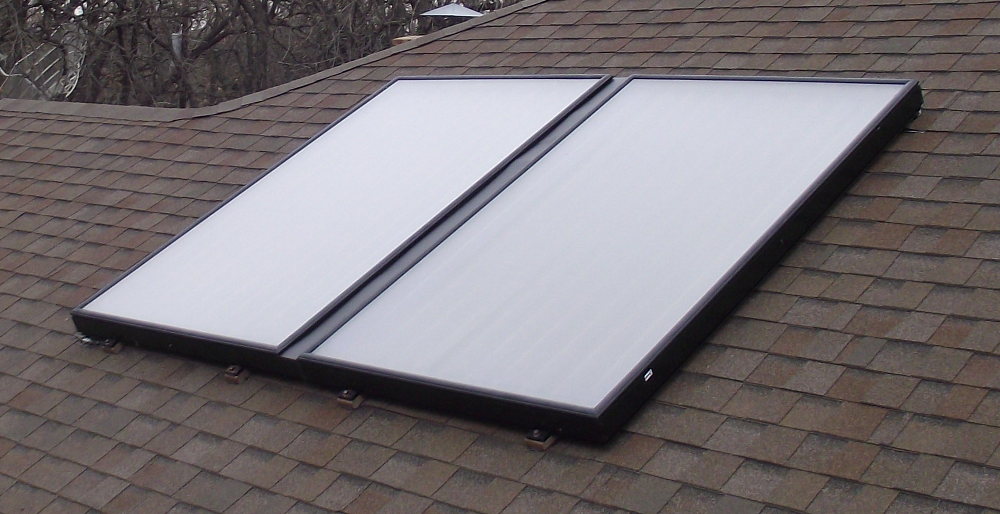
Two flat plate solar collectors side-by-side

Flat-plate collectors are the most common solar thermal technology in Europe. They consist of (1) an enclosure containing (2) a dark-colored absorber plate with fluid circulation passageways, and (3) a transparent cover to allow transmission of solar energy into the enclosure. The sides and back of the enclosure are typically insulated to reduce heat loss to their surroundings. A heat transfer fluid is circulated through the absorber's fluid passageways to remove heat from the solar collector. The circulation fluid in tropical and sub-tropical climates is typically water. In climates where freezing is likely, a heat transfer fluid similar to an automotive antifreeze solution may be used instead of water, or in a mixture with water. If a heat transfer fluid is used, a heat exchanger is typically employed to transfer heat from the solar collector fluid to a hot water storage tank. The most common absorber design consists of copper tubing joined to a high conductivity metal sheet (copper or aluminum). A dark coating is applied to the sun-facing side of the absorber assembly to increase its absorption of solar energy. A common absorber coating is black enamel paint.

In higher performance solar collector designs, the transparent cover is tempered soda-lime glass having reduced iron oxide content same as for photovoltaic solar panels. The glass may also have a stippling pattern and one or two anti-reflective coatings to further enhance transparency. The absorber coating is typically a selective coating, where selective stands for having the special optical property to combine high absorption in the visible part of the electromagnetic spectrum coupled to low emittance in the infrared one. This creates a selective surface, which reduces black body energy emission from the absorber and improves performance. Piping can be laser or ultrasound welded to the absorber sheet to reduce damage to the selective coating, which is typically applied prior to joining to large coils in a roll-to-roll process.

Absorber piping configurations include:

- harp: traditional design with bottom pipe risers and top collection pipe, used in low pressure thermosyphon and pumped systems;
- serpentine: one continuous S-shaped pipe that maximises temperature but not total energy yield in variable flow systems, used in compact solar domestic hot water only systems (no space heating role);
- flooded: consisting of two sheets of metal molded to produce a wide circulation zone that improves heat transfer;
- boundary layer: consisting of several layers of transparent and opaque sheets that enable absorption in a boundary layer. Because the energy is absorbed in the boundary layer, heat conversion may be more efficient than for collectors where absorbed heat is conducted through a material before being accumulated in the circulating liquid.

A flat plate collector making use of a honeycomb structure to reduce heat loss also at the glass side too has also been made available commercially. Most flat plate collectors have a life expectancy of over 25 years..

=== Evacuated tube collectors ===
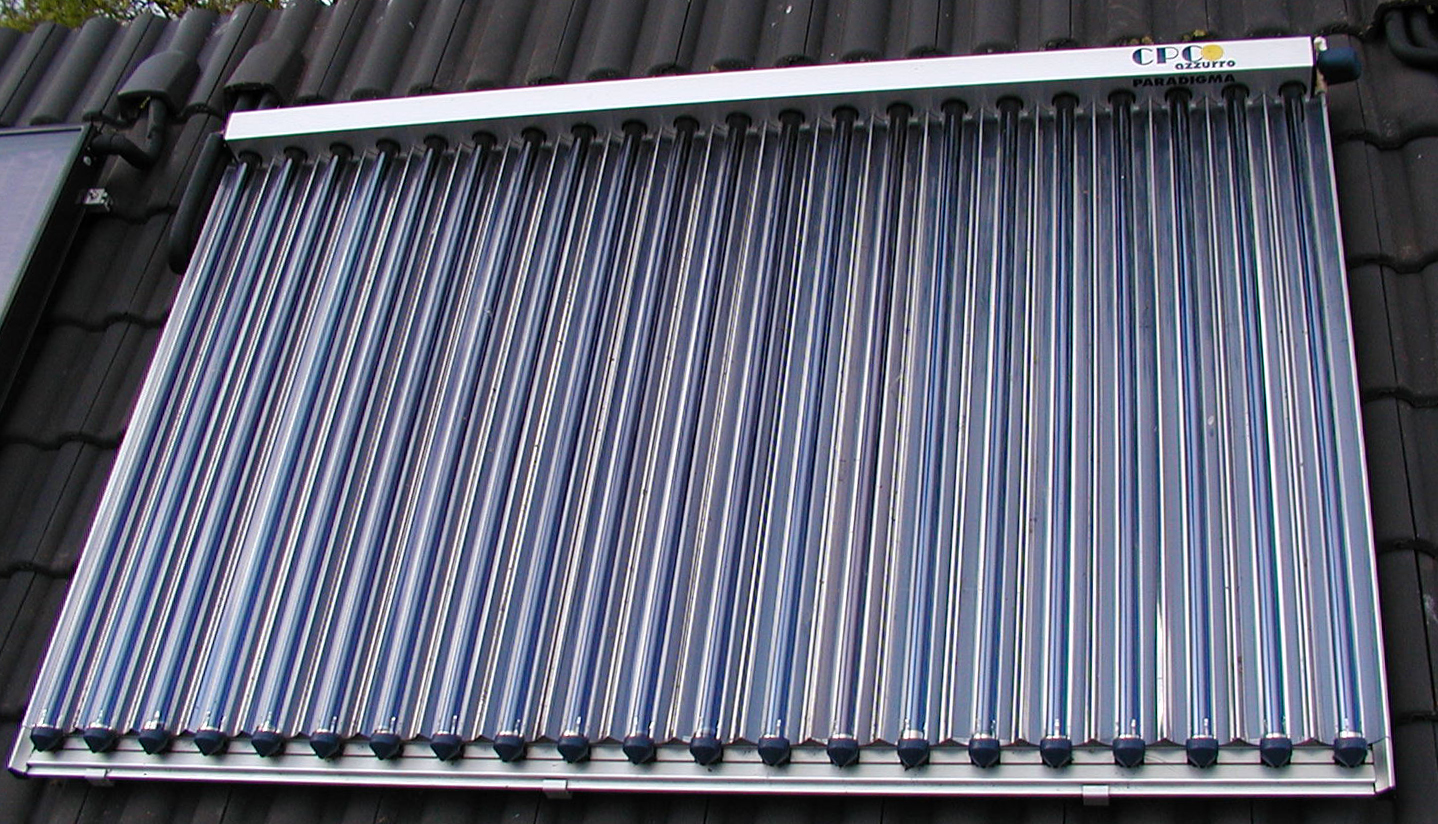
Evacuated tube collector

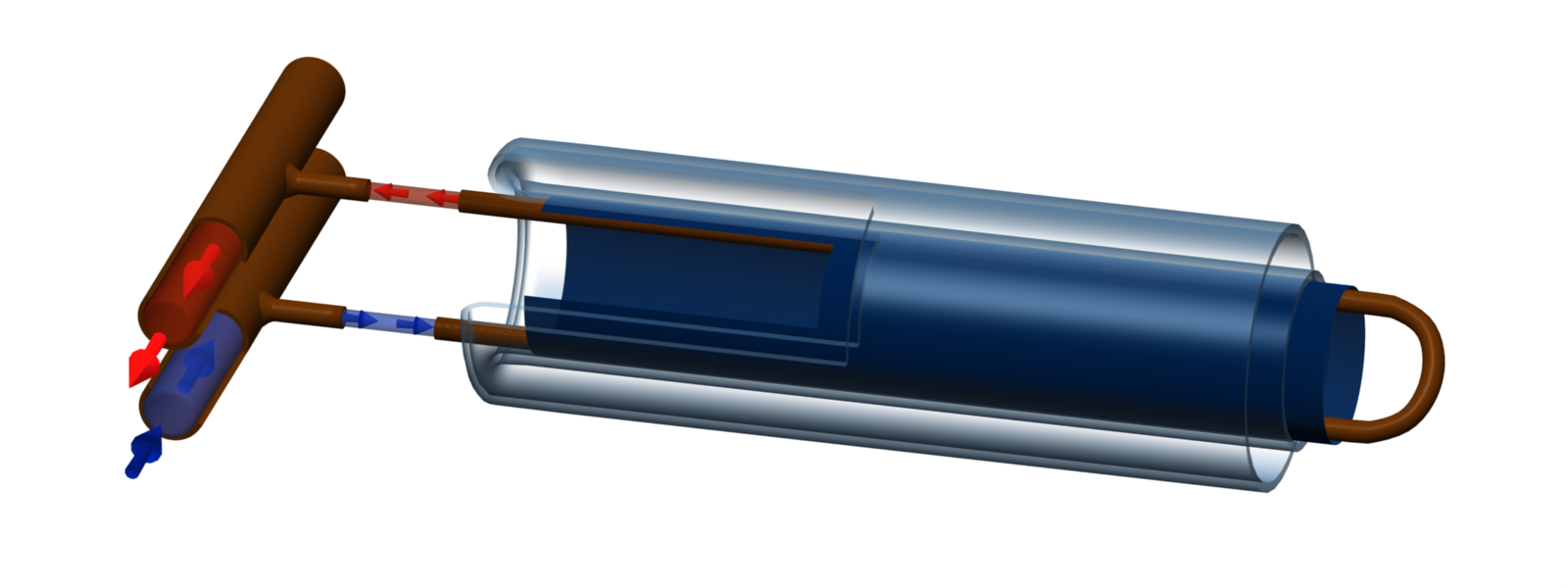
Direct flow evacuated tube

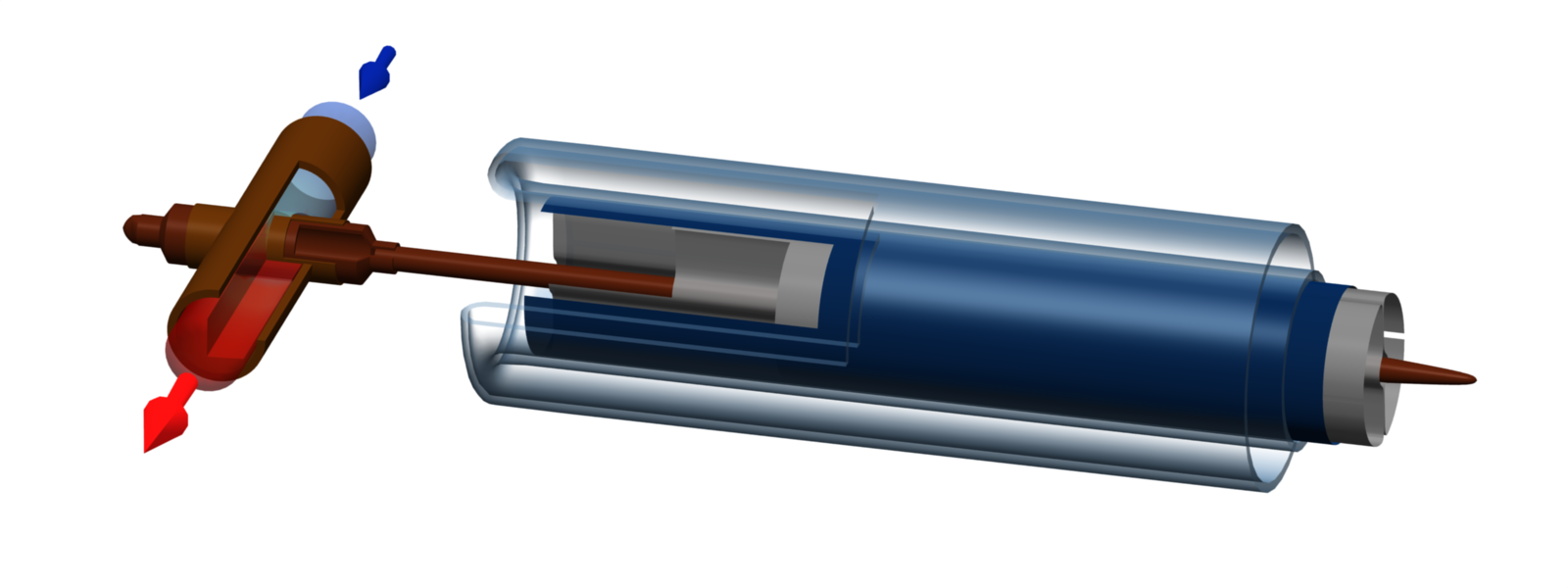
Heat pipe evacuated tube

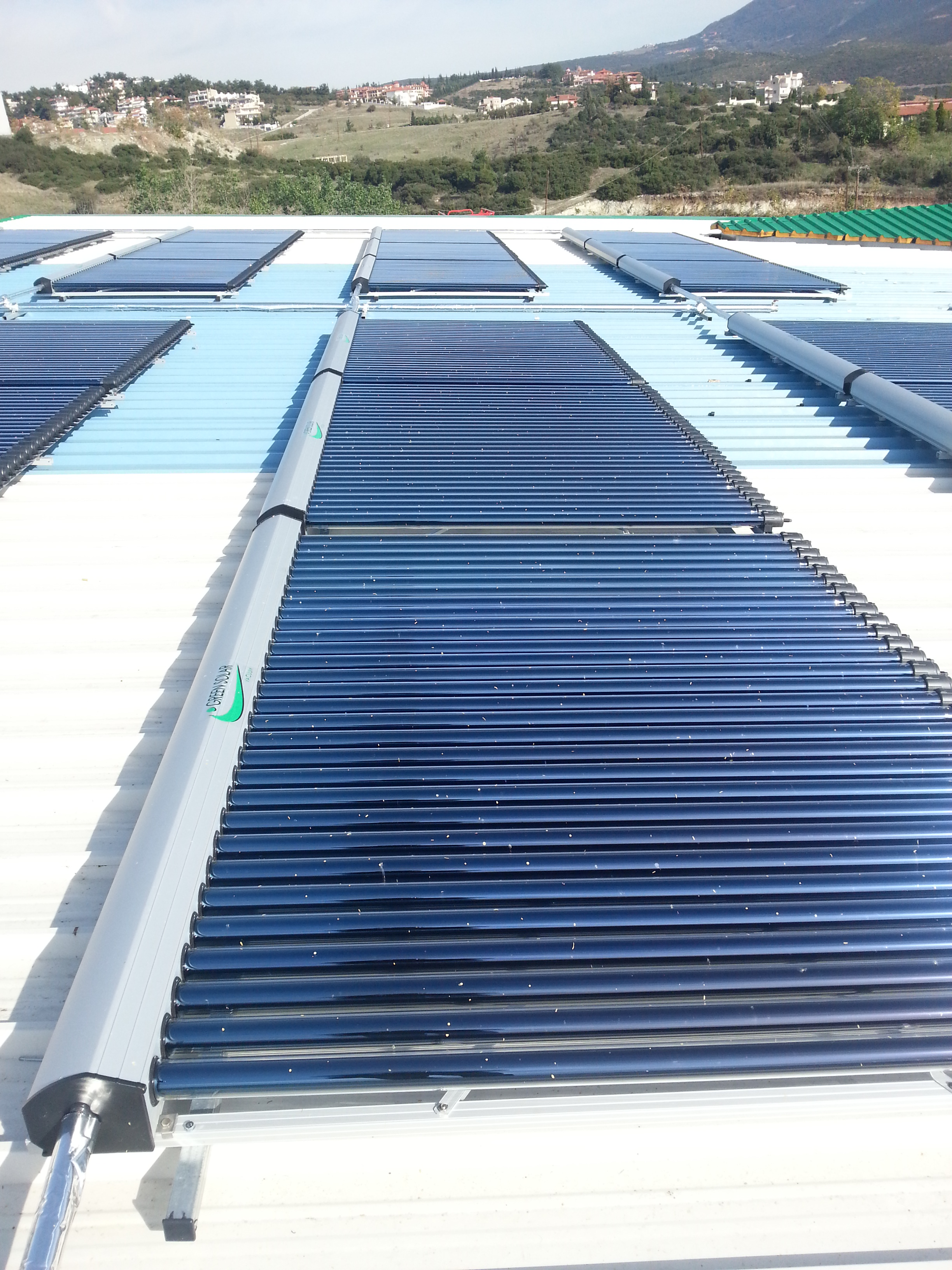
An array of evacuated tube collectors on a roof

Evacuated tube collectors are the most common solar thermal technology in the world. They make use of a glass tube to surround the absorber with high vacuum and effectively resist atmospheric pressure. The vacuum that surrounds the absorber greatly reduces convection and conduction heat loss, therefore achieving greater energy conversion efficiency. The absorber can be either metallic as in the case of flat plate collectors or being a second concentric glass tube ("Sydney Tube"). Heat transfer fluid can flow in and out of each tube or being in contact with a heat pipe reaching inside the tube. For the latter, heat pipes transfer heat to the fluid in a heat exchanger called a "manifold" placed transversely with respect to the tubes. The manifold is wrapped in insulation (glass wool) and covered by a protective metal or plastic case also used for fixing to supports.

Glass-metal evacuated tubes are made with flat or curved metal absorber sheets same as those of flat plates. These sheets are joined to pipes or heat pipes to make "fins" and placed inside a single borosilicate glass tube. An anti-reflective coating can be deposited on the inner and outer surfaces of such tubes to improve transparency. Both selective and anti-reflective coating (inner tube surface) will not degrade until the vacuum is lost. A high vacuum-tight glass-metal seal is however required at one or both sides of each evacuated tube. This seal is cycled between ambient and fluid temperature each day of collector operation and might lead to failures in time.

Glass-glass evacuated tubes are made with two borosilicate glass tubes fused together at one or both ends (similar a vacuum bottle or dewar flask). The absorber fin is placed inside the inner tube at atmospheric pressure. Glass-glass tubes have a very reliable seal, but the two layers of glass reduce the amount of sunlight that reaches the absorber. The selective coating can be deposited on the inner borosilicate tube (high vacuum side) to avoid this, but heat has then to flow through the poorly conducting glass thickness of the inner tube in this case. Moreover, moisture may enter the non-evacuated area inside the inner tube and cause absorber corrosion in particular when made from dissimilar materials (galvanic corrosion).

A Barium flash getter pump is commonly evaporated inside the high vacuum gap in between tubes to keep the internal pressure stable through time.

The high temperatures that can occur inside evacuated tubes may require special design to prevent thermal shock and overheating. Some evacuated tube collectors work as a thermal one-way valve due to their heat pipes. This gives them an inherent maximum operating temperature that acts as a safety feature. Evacuated tubes collectors can also be provided with low concentrating reflectors at the back of the tubes realising a compound parabolic concentrator (CPC) collector.

=== Comparisons of flat plate and evacuated tube collectors ===
A longstanding argument exists between proponents of these two technologies. Some of this can be related to the structure of evacuated tube collectors which have a discontinuous absorbance area. An array of evacuated tubes collectors on a roof has space between the individual tubes and a vacuum gap between each tube and its absorber inside, covering only a fraction of the installation area on a roof. If evacuated tubes are compared with flat-plate collectors on the basis of the area of roof occupied (gross area), a different conclusion might be reached than if the absorber or aperture areas were compared. The recent revision of the ISO 9806 standard states that the efficiency of solar thermal collectors should be measured in terms of gross area and this might favour flat plates in respect to evacuated tube collectors in direct comparisons.

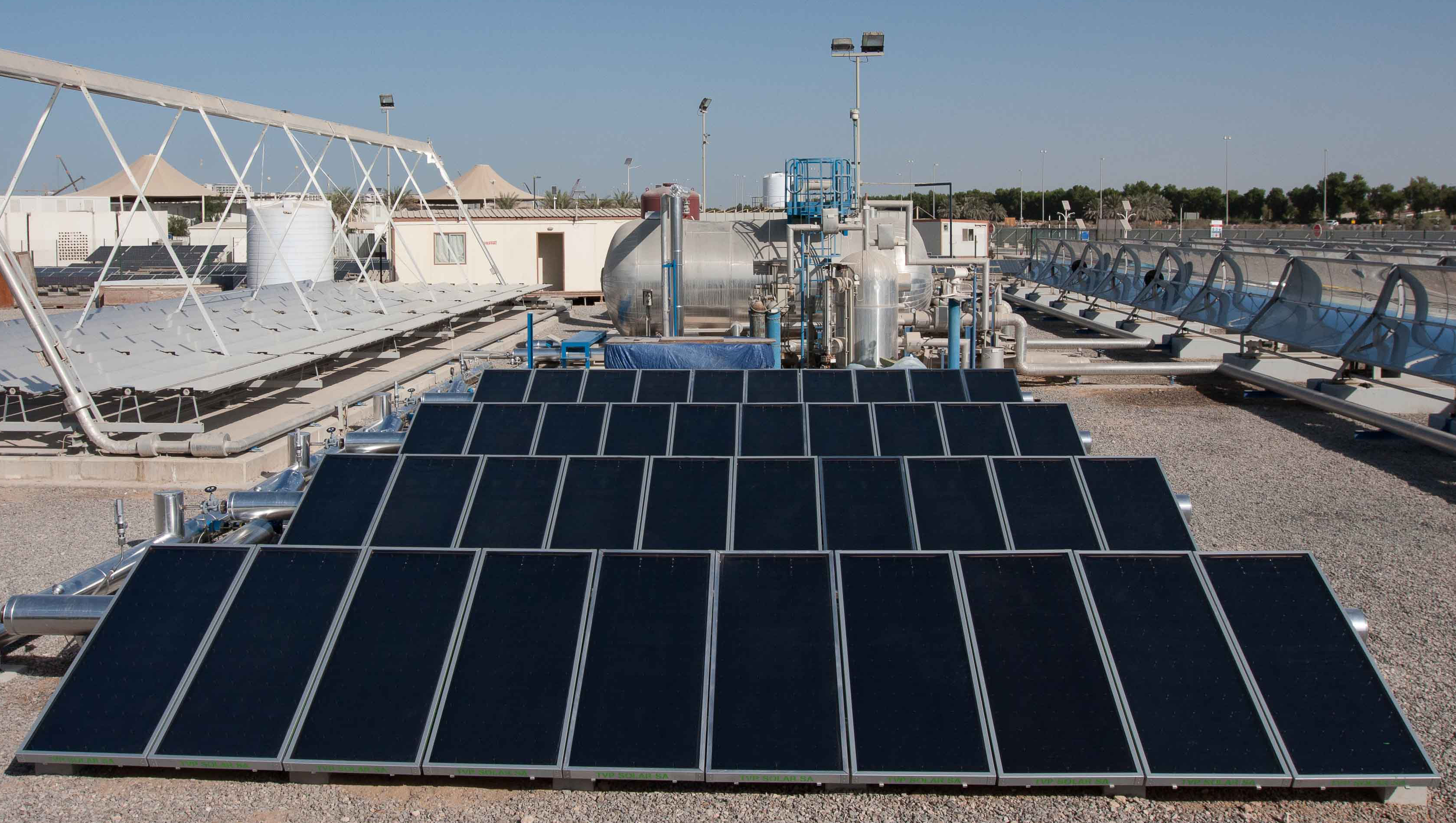
An array of evacuated flat plate collectors next to compact solar concentrators

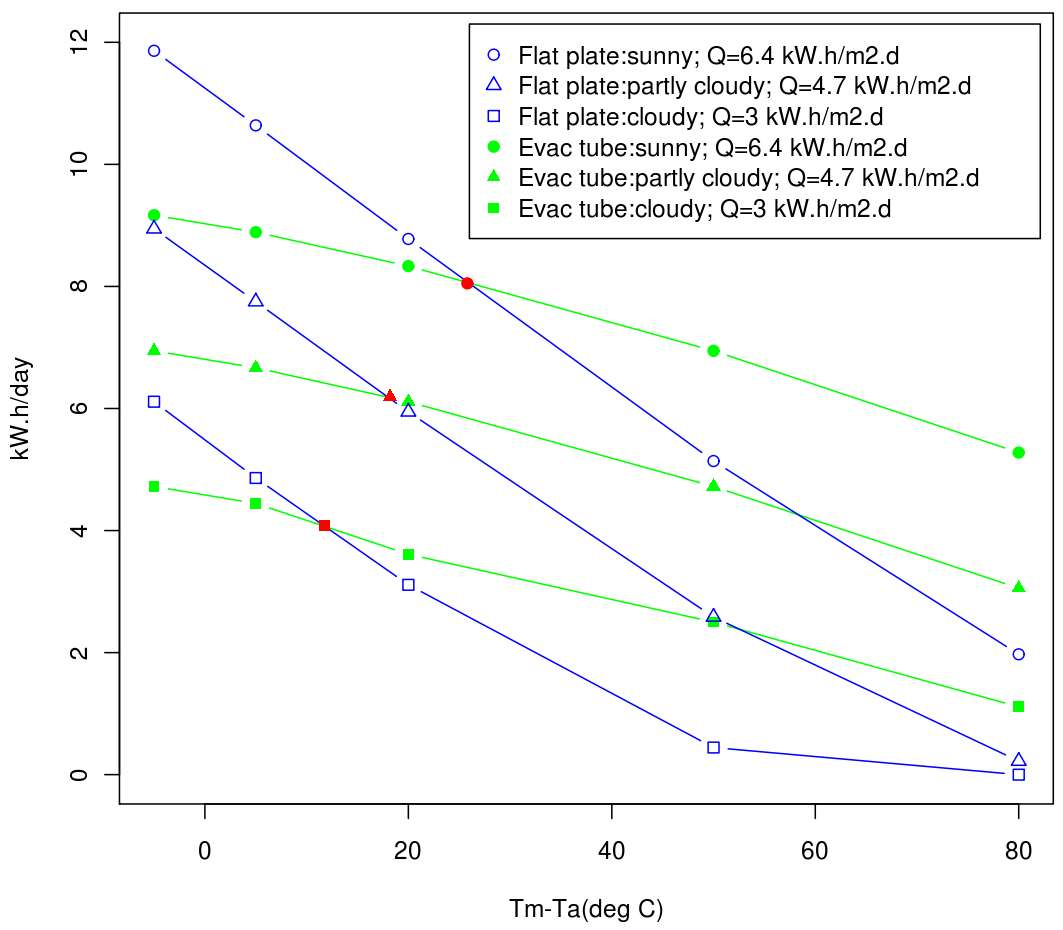
A comparison of the energy output (kW.h/day) of a flat plate collector (blue lines; Thermodynamics S42-P; absorber 2.8 m^{2}) and an evacuated tube collector (green lines; SunMaxx 20EVT; absorber 3.1 m^{2}. Data obtained from SRCC certification documents on the Internet. Tm-Ta = temperature difference between water in the collector and the ambient temperature. Q = insolation during the measurements. Firstly, as (Tm-Ta) increases the flat plate collector loses efficiency more rapidly than the evac tube collector. This means the flat plate collector is less efficient in producing water higher than 25 degrees C above ambient (i.e. to the right of the red marks on the graph). Secondly, even though the output of both collectors drop off strongly under cloudy conditions (low insolation), the evac tube collector yields significantly more energy under cloudiness than the flat plate collector. Although many factors obstruct the extrapolation from two collectors to two different technologies, above, the basic relationships between their efficiencies remain valid.

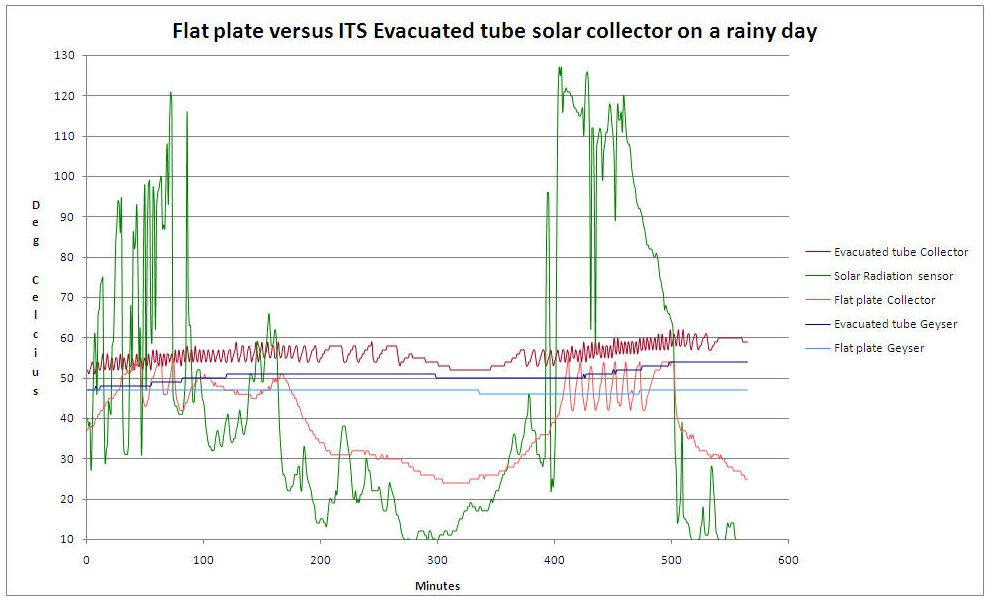
A field trial illustrating the differences discussed in the figure on the left. A flat plate collector and a similar-sized evacuated tube collector were installed adjacently on a roof, each with a pump, controller and storage tank. Several variables were logged during a day with intermittent rain and cloud. Green line = solar irradiation. The top maroon line indicates the temperature of the evac tube collector for which cycling of the pump is much slower and even stopping for some 30 minutes during the cool parts of the day (irradiation low), indicating a slow rate of heat collection. The temperature of the flat plate collector fell significantly during the day (bottom purple line) but started cycling again later in the day when irradiation increased. The temperature in the water storage tank of the evac tube system (dark blue graph) increased by 8 degrees C during the day while that of the flat plate system (light blue graph) only remained constant. Courtesy ITS-solar.

Flat-plate collectors usually lose more heat to the environment than evacuated tubes because there is no insulation at the glass side. Evacuated tube collectors intrinsically have a lower absorber to gross area ratio (typically 60–80% less) than flat plates because tubes have to be spaced apart. Although several European companies manufacture evacuated tube collectors (mainly glass-metal type), the evacuated tube market is dominated by manufacturers in China, with some companies having track records of 15–30 years or more. There is no unambiguous evidence that the two designs differ in long-term reliability. However, evacuated tube technology (especially for newer variants with glass-metal seals and heat pipes) still needs to demonstrate competitive lifetimes. The modularity of evacuated tubes can be advantageous in terms of extensibility and maintenance, for example, if the vacuum in one heat pipe tube is lost it can be easily be replaced with minimal effort.

Chart showing flat-plate collectors outperforming evacuated tubes up until 67 °C (120 °F) above ambient and, shaded in gray, the normal operating range for solar domestic hot water systems.

In most climates, flat plate collectors will generally be more cost-effective than evacuated tubes. However, evacuated tube collectors are well-suited to cold ambient temperatures and work well in situations of low solar irradiance, providing heat more consistently throughout the year. Unglazed flat plate collectors are the preferred devices for heating swimming pool water. Unglazed collectors may be suitable in tropical or subtropical environments if domestic hot water needs to be heated by less than 20 °C (36 °F) over ambient temperature. Evacuated tube collectors have less aerodynamic drag, which may allow for a simpler installation on roofs in windy locations. The gaps between the tubes may allow for snow to fall through the collector, minimizing the loss of production in some snowy conditions, though the lack of radiated heat from the tubes can also prevent effective shedding of accumulated snow. Flat plate collectors might be easier to clean. Other properties, such as appearance and ease of installation are more subjective and difficult to compare.

=== Evacuated flat plate collectors ===
Evacuated flat plate solar collectors provide all the advantages of both flat plate and evacuated tube collectors combined. They surround a large area metal sheet absorber with high vacuum inside a flat envelope made of glass and metal. They offer the highest energy conversion efficiency of any non-concentrating solar thermal collector, but require sophisticated technology for manufacturing. They should not be confused with flat plate collectors featuring low vacuum inside. The first collector making use of high vacuum insulation was developed at CERN, while TVP SOLAR SA of Switzerland was the first company to commercialise Solar Keymark certified collectors in 2012.

Evacuated flat plate solar collectors require both a glass-metal seal to join the glass plate to the rest of the metal envelope and an internal structure to support such plate against atmospheric pressure. The absorber has to be segmented or provided with suitable holes to accommodate such structure. Joining of all parts has to be high vacuum-tight and only materials with low vapour pressure can be used to prevent outgassing. Glass-metal seal technology can be based either on metallized glass or vitrified metal and defines the type of collector. Different from evacuated tube collectors, they make use of non-evaporable getter (NEG) pumps to keep the internal pressure stable through time. This getter pump technology has the advantage of providing some regeneration in-situ by exposure to sunlight. Evacuated flat plate solar collectors have been studied for solar air condition and compared to compact solar concentrators.

==== Polymer flat plate collectors ====
These collectors are an alternative to metal collectors. These may be wholly polymer, or they may include metal plates in front of freeze-tolerant water channels made of silicone rubber. Polymers are flexible and therefore freeze-tolerant and can employ plain water instead of antifreeze, so that they may be plumbed directly into existing water tanks instead of needing heat exchangers that lower efficiency. By dispensing with a heat exchanger, temperatures need not be quite so high for the circulation system to be switched on, so such direct circulation panels, whether polymer or otherwise, can be more efficient, particularly at low solar irradiance levels. Some early selectively coated polymer collectors suffered from overheating when insulated, as stagnation temperatures can exceed the polymer's melting point. For example, the melting point of polypropylene is 160 °C (320 °F), while the stagnation temperature of insulated thermal collectors can exceed 180 °C (356 °F) if control strategies are not used. For this reason, polypropylene is not often used in glazed selectively coated solar collectors. Increasingly, polymers such as high temperate silicones (which melt at over 250 °C (482 °F)) are being used. Some non polypropylene polymer based glazed solar collectors are matte black coated rather than selectively coated to reduce the stagnation temperature to 150 °C (302 °F) or less.

In areas where freezing is a possibility, freeze-tolerance (the capability to freeze repeatedly without cracking) can be achieved by the use of flexible polymers. Silicone rubber pipes have been used for this purpose in UK since 1999. Conventional metal collectors are vulnerable to damage from freezing, so if they are water filled they must be carefully plumbed so they completely drain using gravity before freezing is expected so that they do not crack. Many metal collectors are installed as part of a sealed heat exchanger system. Rather than having potable water flow directly through the collectors, a mixture of water and antifreeze such as propylene glycol is used. A heat exchange fluid protects against freeze damage down to a locally determined risk temperature that depends on the proportion of propylene glycol in the mixture. The use of glycol lowers the water's heat carrying capacity marginally, while the addition of an extra heat exchanger may lower system performance at low light levels.

A pool or unglazed collector is a simple form of flat-plate collector without a transparent cover. Typically, polypropylene or EPDM rubber or silicone rubber is used as an absorber. Used for pool heating, it can work quite well when the desired output temperature is near the ambient temperature (that is, when it is warm outside). As the ambient temperature gets cooler, these collectors become less effective.

==== Bowl collectors ====
A solar bowl is a type of solar thermal collector that operates similarly to a parabolic dish, but instead of using a tracking parabolic mirror with a fixed receiver, it has a fixed spherical mirror with a tracking receiver. This reduces efficiency but makes it cheaper to build and operate. Designers call it a fixed mirror distributed focus solar power system. The main reason for its development was to eliminate the cost of moving a large mirror to track the sun as with parabolic dish systems.

A fixed parabolic mirror creates a variously shaped image of the sun as it moves across the sky. Only when the mirror is pointed directly at the sun does the light focus on one point. That is why parabolic dish systems track the sun. A fixed spherical mirror focuses the light in the same place independent of the sun's position. The light, however, is not directed to one point but is distributed on a line from the surface of the mirror to one half radius (along a line that runs through the sphere center and the sun).

Typical energy density along the 1/2 radius length focal line of a spherical reflector

As the sun moves across the sky, the aperture of any fixed collector changes. This causes changes in the amount of captured sunlight, producing what is called the sinus effect of power output. Proponents of the solar bowl design claim the reduction in overall power output compared with tracking parabolic mirrors is offset by lower system costs.

The sunlight concentrated at the focal line of a spherical reflector is collected using a tracking receiver. This receiver is pivoted around the focal line and is usually counterbalanced. The receiver may consist of pipes carrying fluid for thermal transfer or photovoltaic cells for direct conversion of light to electricity.

The solar bowl design resulted from a project of the Electrical Engineering Department of the Texas Technical University, headed by Edwin O'Hair, to develop a 5 MWe power plant. A solar bowl was built for the town of Crosbyton, Texas as a pilot facility. The bowl had a diameter of 65 ft (20 m), tilted at a 15° angle to optimize the cost/yield relation (33° would have maximized yield). The rim of the hemisphere was "trimmed" to 60°, creating a maximum aperture of 3,318 square feet (308.3 m^{2}). This pilot bowl produced electricity at a rate of 10 kW peak.

A 15-metre (49 ft) diameter Auroville solar bowl was developed from an earlier test of a 3.5-metre (11 ft) bowl in 1979–1982 by the Tata Energy Research Institute. That test showed the use of the solar bowl in the production of steam for cooking. The full-scale project to build a solar bowl and kitchen ran from 1996 and was fully operational by 2001.

In locations with average available solar energy, flat plate collectors are sized approximately 1.2 to 2.4 square decimeter per liter of one day's hot water use.

=== Applications ===
The main use of this technology is in residential buildings where the demand for hot water has a large impact on energy bills. This generally means a situation with a large family or a situation in which the hot water demand is excessive due to frequent laundry washing. Commercial applications include laundromats, car washes, military laundry facilities and eating establishments. The technology can also be used for space heating if the building is located off-grid or if utility power is subject to frequent outages. Solar water heating systems are most likely to be cost effective for facilities with water heating systems that are expensive to operate, or with operations such as laundries or kitchens that require large quantities of hot water. Unglazed liquid collectors are commonly used to heat water for swimming pools but can also be applied to large-scale water pre-heating. When loads are large relative to the available collector area, the bulk of the water heating can be done at low temperature, lower than swimming pool temperatures where unglazed collectors are well established in the marketplace as the right choice. Because these collectors need not withstand high temperatures, they can use less expensive materials such as plastic or rubber. Many unglazed collectors are made of polypropylene and must be drained fully to avoid freeze damage when air temperatures drop below 44 °F (7 °C) on clear nights. A smaller but growing percentage of unglazed collectors are flexible meaning they can withstand water freezing solid inside their absorber. The freeze concern only needs to be the water-filled piping and collector manifolds in a hard freeze condition. Unglazed solar hot water systems should be installed to "drainback" to a storage tank whenever solar radiation is insufficient. There are no thermal shock concerns with unglazed systems. Commonly used in swimming pool heating since solar energy's early beginnings, unglazed solar collectors heat swimming pool water directly without the need for antifreeze or heat exchangers. Hot water solar systems require heat exchangers due to contamination possibilities and in the case of unglazed collectors, the pressure difference between the solar working fluid (water) and the load (pressurized cold city water). Large-scale unglazed solar hot water heaters, like the one at the Minoru Aquatic Center in Richmond, BC operate at lower temperatures than evacuated tube or boxed and glazed collector systems. Although they require larger, more expensive heat exchangers, all other components including vented storage tanks and uninsulated plastic PVC piping reduce the costs of this alternative dramatically compared to the higher temperature collector types. When heating hot water, we are actually heating cold to warm and warm to hot. We can heat cold to warm as efficiently with unglazed collectors, just as we can heat warm to hot with high-temperature collectors.

== Heating air ==
A simple solar air collector consists of an absorber material, sometimes having a selective surface, to capture radiation from the sun and transfers this thermal energy to air via conduction heat transfer. This heated air is then ducted to the building space or to the process area where the heated air is used for space heating or process heating needs. Functioning in a similar manner as a conventional forced-air furnace, solar-thermal-air systems provide heat by circulating air over an energy collecting surface, absorbing the sun's thermal energy, and ducting air coming in contact with it. Simple and effective collectors can be made for a variety of air conditioning and process applications.

Many applications can utilize solar air heat technologies to reduce the carbon footprint from the use of conventional heat sources, such as fossil fuels, to create a sustainable means to produce thermal energy. Applications such as space heating, greenhouse season extension, pre-heating ventilation makeup air, or process heat can be addressed by solar air heat devices. In the field of 'solar co-generation', solar thermal technologies are paired with photovoltaics (PV) to increase the efficiency of the system by taking heat away from the PV collectors, cooling the PV panels to improve their electrical performance while simultaneously warming air for space heating.

=== Space heating and ventilating ===
Space heating for residential and commercial applications can be done through the use of solar air heating panels. This configuration operates by drawing air from the building envelope or from the outdoor environment and passing it through the collector where the air warms via conduction from the absorber and is then supplied to the living or working space by either passive means or with the assistance of a fan. A pioneering figure of this type of system was George Löf, who built a solar-heated air system in 1945 for a house in Boulder, Colorado. He later included a gravel bed for heat storage.

Ventilation, fresh air or makeup air is required in most commercial, industrial and institutional buildings to meet code requirements. By drawing air through a properly designed unglazed transpired air collector or an air heater, the solar heated fresh air can reduce the heating load during daytime operation. Many applications are now being installed where the transpired collector preheats the fresh air entering a heat recovery ventilator to reduce the defrost time of HRV's. The higher your ventilation and temperature the better your payback time will be.

=== Process heating ===
Solar air heat is also used in process applications such as drying laundry, crops (i.e. tea, corn, coffee) and other drying applications. Air heated through a solar collector and then passed over a medium to be dried can provide an efficient means by which to reduce the moisture content of the material.

High temperature process heat can be produced by a solar furnace.

=== Solar air heating collector types ===
Collectors are commonly classified by their air-ducting methods as one of three types:

- through-pass collectors
- front-pass
- back pass
- combination front and back pass collectors

Collectors can also be classified by their outer surface:

- glazed
- unglazed

=== Through-pass air collector ===
Offering the highest efficiency of any solar technology the through-pass configuration, air ducted onto one side of the absorber passes through a perforated material and is heated from the conductive properties of the material and the convective properties of the moving air. Through-pass absorbers have the most surface area which enables relatively high conductive heat transfer rates, but significant pressure drop can require greater fan power, and deterioration of certain absorber material after many years of solar radiation exposure can additionally create problems with air quality and performance.

==== Back, front, and combination passage air collector ====
In back-pass, front-pass, and combination type configurations the air is directed on either the back, the front, or on both sides of the absorber to be heated from the return to the supply ducting headers. Although passing the air on both sides of the absorber will provide a greater surface area for conductive heat transfer, issues with dust (fouling) can arise from passing air on the front side of the absorber which reduces absorber efficiency by limiting the amount of sunlight received. In cold climates, air passing next to the glazing will additionally cause greater heat loss, resulting in lower overall performance of the collector.

==== Glazed systems ====
Glazed systems usually have a transparent top sheet and insulated side and back panels to minimize heat loss to ambient air. The absorber plates in modern panels can have absorptivity of more than 93%. Glazed Solar Collectors (recirculating types that are usually used for space heating). Air typically passes along the front or back of the absorber plate while scrubbing heat directly from it. Heated air can then be distributed directly for applications such as space heating and drying or may be stored for later use. Payback for glazed solar air heating panels can be less than 9–15 years depending on the fuel being replaced.

==== Unglazed systems ====
Unglazed systems, or transpired air systems have been used to heat make-up or ventilation air in commercial, industrial, agriculture and process applications. They consist of an absorber plate which air passes across or through as it scrubs heat from the absorber. Non-transparent glazing materials are less expensive and decrease expected payback periods. Transpired collectors are considered "unglazed" because their collector surfaces are exposed to the elements, are often not transparent and not hermetically sealed.

=== Unglazed transpired solar collectors ===
==== Background ====
The term "unglazed air collector" refers to a solar air heating system that consists of a metal absorber without any glass or glazing over top. The most common type of unglazed collector on the market is the transpired solar collector. The technology has been extensively monitored by these government agencies, and Natural Resources Canada developed the feasibility tool RETScreen™ to model the energy savings from transpired solar collectors. Since that time, several thousand transpired solar collector systems have been installed in a variety of commercial, industrial, institutional, agricultural, and process applications in countries around the world. This technology was originally used primarily in industrial applications such as manufacturing and assembly plants where there were high ventilation requirements, stratified ceiling heat, and often negative pressure in the building. With the increasing drive to install renewable energy systems on buildings, transpired solar collectors are now used across the entire building stock because of high energy production (up to 750 peak thermal Watts/square metre), high solar conversion (up to 90%) and lower capital costs when compared against solar photovoltaic and solar water heating.

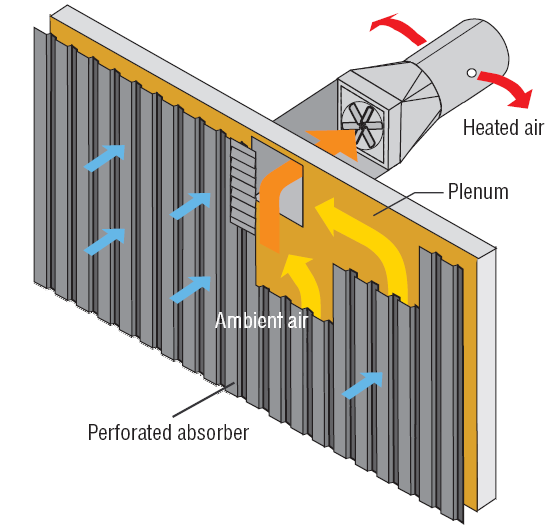
Solar air heating is a solar thermal technology in which the energy from the sun, solar insolation, is captured by an absorbing medium and used to heat air.

Solar air heating is a renewable energy heating technology used to heat or condition air for buildings or process heat applications. It is typically the most cost-effective of all the solar technologies, especially in large scale applications, and it addresses the largest usage of building energy in heating climates, which is space heating and industrial process heating. They are either glazed or unglazed.

==== Method of operation ====
Unglazed air collectors heat ambient (outside) air instead of recirculated building air. Transpired solar collectors are usually wall-mounted to capture the lower sun angle in the winter heating months as well as sun reflection off the snow and achieve their optimum performance and return on investment when operating at flow rates of between 4 and 8 CFM per square foot (72 to 144 m3/h.m2) of collector area.

The exterior surface of a transpired solar collector consists of thousands of tiny micro-perforations that allow the boundary layer of heat to be captured and uniformly drawn into an air cavity behind the exterior panels. This heated ventilation air is drawn under negative pressure into the building's ventilation system where it is then distributed via conventional means or using a solar ducting system.

Hot air that may enter an HVAC system connected to a transpired collector that has air outlets positioned along the top of the collector, particularly if the collector is west facing. To counter this problem, Matrix Energy has patented a transpired collector with a lower air outlet position and perforated cavity framing to perpetrate increased air turbulence behind the perforated absorber for increased performance.

This cutaway view shows the SolarWall transpired solar collector components and air flow. The lower air inlet mitigates the intake of heated air to the HVAC system during summer operation.

The extensive monitoring by Natural Resources Canada and NREL has shown that transpired solar collector systems reduce between 10 and 50% of the conventional heating load and that RETScreen is an accurate predictor of system performance. Transpired solar collectors act as a rainscreen and they also capture heat loss escaping from the building envelope which is collected in the collector air cavity and drawn back into the ventilation system. There is no maintenance required with solar air heating systems and the expected lifespan is over 30 years.

==== Variations of transpired solar collectors ====
Unglazed transpired collectors can also be roof-mounted for applications in which there is no suitable south-facing wall or for other architectural considerations.

Each ten-foot (3.05 m) module will deliver 250 CFM (425 m3/h)of preheated fresh air typically providing annual energy savings of 1100 kWh (4 GJ) annually. This unique two-stage, modular roof-mounted transpired collector operating a nearly 90% efficiency each module delivering over 118 L/s of preheated air per two square meter collector. Up to seven collectors may be connected in series in one row, with no limit to the number of rows connected in parallel along one central duct typically yielding 4 CFM of preheated air per square foot of available roof area.

Transpired collectors can be configured to heat the air twice to increase the delivered air temperature making it suitable for space heating applications as well as ventilation air heating. In a 2-stage system, the first stage is the typical unglazed transpired collector and the second stage has glazing covering the transpired collector. The glazing allows all of that heated air from the first stage to be directed through a second set of transpired collectors for a second stage of solar heating.

== Generating electricity ==
Parabolic troughs, dishes and towers described in this section are used almost exclusively in solar power generating stations or for research purposes. Parabolic troughs have been used for some commercial solar air conditioning systems. Although simple, these solar concentrators are quite far from the theoretical maximum concentration. For example, the parabolic trough concentration is about 1/3 of the theoretical maximum for the same acceptance angle, that is, for the same overall tolerances for the system. Approaching the theoretical maximum may be achieved by using more elaborate concentrators based on nonimaging optics. Solar thermal collectors may also be used in conjunction with photovoltaic collectors to obtain combined heat and power.

Parabolic trough

=== Parabolic trough ===
This type of collector is generally used in solar power plants. A trough-shaped parabolic reflector is used to concentrate sunlight on an insulated tube (Dewar tube) or heat pipe, placed at the focal point, containing coolant which transfers heat from the collectors to the boilers in the power station.

=== Parabolic dish ===
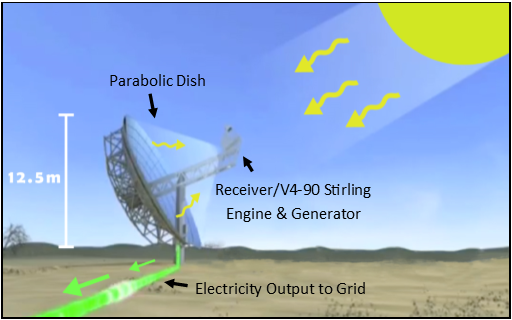
Solar parabolic dish

With a parabolic dish collector, one or more parabolic dishes concentrate solar energy at a single focal point, similar to the way a reflecting telescope focuses starlight, or a dish antenna focuses radio waves. This geometry may be used in solar furnaces and solar power plants.

The shape of a parabola means that incoming light rays which are parallel to the dish's axis will be reflected toward the focus, no matter where on the dish they arrive. Light from the sun arrives at the Earth's surface almost completely parallel, and the dish is aligned with its axis pointing at the sun, allowing almost all incoming radiation to be reflected towards the focal point of the dish. Most losses in such collectors are due to imperfections in the parabolic shape and imperfect reflection.

Losses due to atmospheric scattering are generally minimal. However, on a hazy or foggy day, light is diffused in all directions through the atmosphere, which significantly reduces the efficiency of a parabolic dish. In dish stirling power plant designs, a stirling engine coupled to a dynamo is placed at the focus of the dish. This absorbs the energy focused onto it and converts it into electricity.

=== Power tower ===
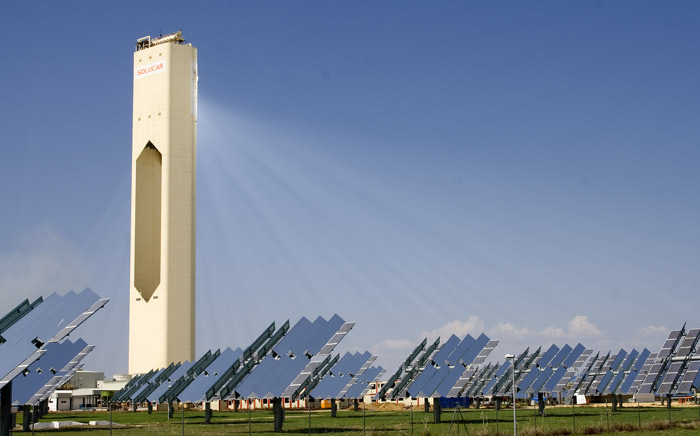
Solar power tower

A power tower is a large tower surrounded by tracking mirrors called heliostats. These mirrors align themselves and focus sunlight on the receiver at the top of the tower, collected heat is transferred to a power station below. This design reaches very high temperatures. High temperatures are suitable for electricity generation using conventional methods like steam turbine or a direct high-temperature chemical reaction such as liquid salt. By concentrating sunlight, current systems can get better efficiency than simple solar cells. A larger area can be covered by using relatively inexpensive mirrors rather than using expensive solar cells. Concentrated light can be redirected to a suitable location via optical fiber cable for such uses as illuminating buildings. Heat storage for power production during cloudy and overnight conditions can be accomplished, often by underground tank storage of heated fluids. Molten salts have been used to good effect. Other working fluids, such as liquid metals, have also been proposed due to their superior thermal properties.

However, concentrating systems require sun tracking to maintain sunlight focus at the collector. They are unable to provide significant power in diffused light conditions. Solar cells are able to provide some output even if the sky becomes cloudy, but power output from concentrating systems drops drastically in cloudy conditions as diffused light cannot be concentrated well.

== General principles of operation ==
A solar thermal collector functions as a heat exchanger that converts solar radiation into thermal energy. It differs from a conventional heat exchanger in several aspects. The solar energy flux (irradiance) incident on the Earth's surface has a variable and relatively low surface density, usually not exceeding 1100 W/m^{2} without concentration systems. Moreover, the wavelength of incident solar radiation falls between 0.3 and 3 μm, which is significantly shorter than the wavelength of radiation emitted by most radiative surfaces.

The collector absorbs the incoming solar radiation, converting it into thermal energy. This thermal energy is then transferred to a heat transfer fluid circulating within the collector. The heat transfer fluid can be air, water, oil, or a mixture including glycol (an antifreeze fluid), especially in forced circulation systems. Concentration systems may utilize phase change materials such as molten salts. The thermal energy of the heat transfer fluid can then be used directly or stored for later use. The transfer of thermal energy occurs through convection, which can be either natural or forced depending on the specific system. Use of artitifcal turbulence promoter in both solar air, and water heaters have been investigated to increase their thermal efficicency.

== Standards ==
- ISO test methods for solar collectors.
- EN 12975: Thermal solar systems and components. Solar collectors.
- EN 12976: Thermal solar systems and components. Factory-made systems.
- EN 12977: Thermal solar systems and components. Custom-made systems.
- Solar Keymark: Thermal solar systems and components. Higher level EN 1297X series certification which includes factory visits.
- International Code Council / Solar Rating & Certification Corporation: Testing is performed by independent laboratories and typically includes selection of a collector to be tested from a sample group of at least six solar collectors.
- ICC 901/ICC-SRCC™ 100: Solar Thermal Collector Standard
- ICC 900/ICC-SRCC™ 300: Solar Thermal System Standard
- ICC 902/APSP 902/ICC-SRCC™ 400: Solar Pool and Spa Heating System Standard

== See also ==
- Concentrated solar power
- Cross-linked polyethylene § PEX-AL-PEX
- Insulated glazing
- List of solar thermal power stations
- List of thermal conductivities
- Nanofluids in solar collectors
- Particle receiver
- Seasonal thermal energy storage (STES)
- Selective surface
- Solar cooker
- Solar Flower Tower
- Solar thermal energy
- Solar-assisted heat pump
- Trombe wall
- Zeolite
