= Optical overheating protection =

Solar thermal collector systems

With all solar thermal collector systems there is a potential risk that the solar collector may reach an equilibrium or stagnation temperature higher than the maximum safe operating temperature. Various measures are taken for optical overheating protection.

Stagnation temperatures are encountered under conditions of high radiation while no heat transfer fluid is flowing through the collector, for example during power failures, component failures, servicing, energy storage capacity limitations, or periods when little hot water is extracted from the system. More generally, stagnation conditions can be considered to be any situation under which the solar collector cannot adequately dispatch the absorbed solar heat to the heat transfer fluid.

Besides any damaging effects to the system, high stagnation temperatures also place constraints on collector materials. These materials must retain their important properties during and after exposure to the high stagnation temperatures. This implies that solar collectors are generally built from high temperature resistant materials. These materials are usually expensive, heavy, and have an overall high environmental impact.

Polymeric materials offer a significant cost-reduction and environmental improvement potential for solar thermal collectors and may thus benefit a broader utilization of solar energy for various heating purposes. However, the long-term service temperature of plastics is limited. Thus, for potential applications of plastics in solar absorbers an appropriate design including overheating protection is essential. Feasible ways would be a reduction in optical gain (for example, using thermotropic layers, or electrochromic devices) or an increase in system losses, by dumping of the hot water excess.

In this article an alternative method to decrease the optical gain is presented. The method is based on the geometry of prisms and the phenomenon of Total Internal Reflection.

== Working principle ==
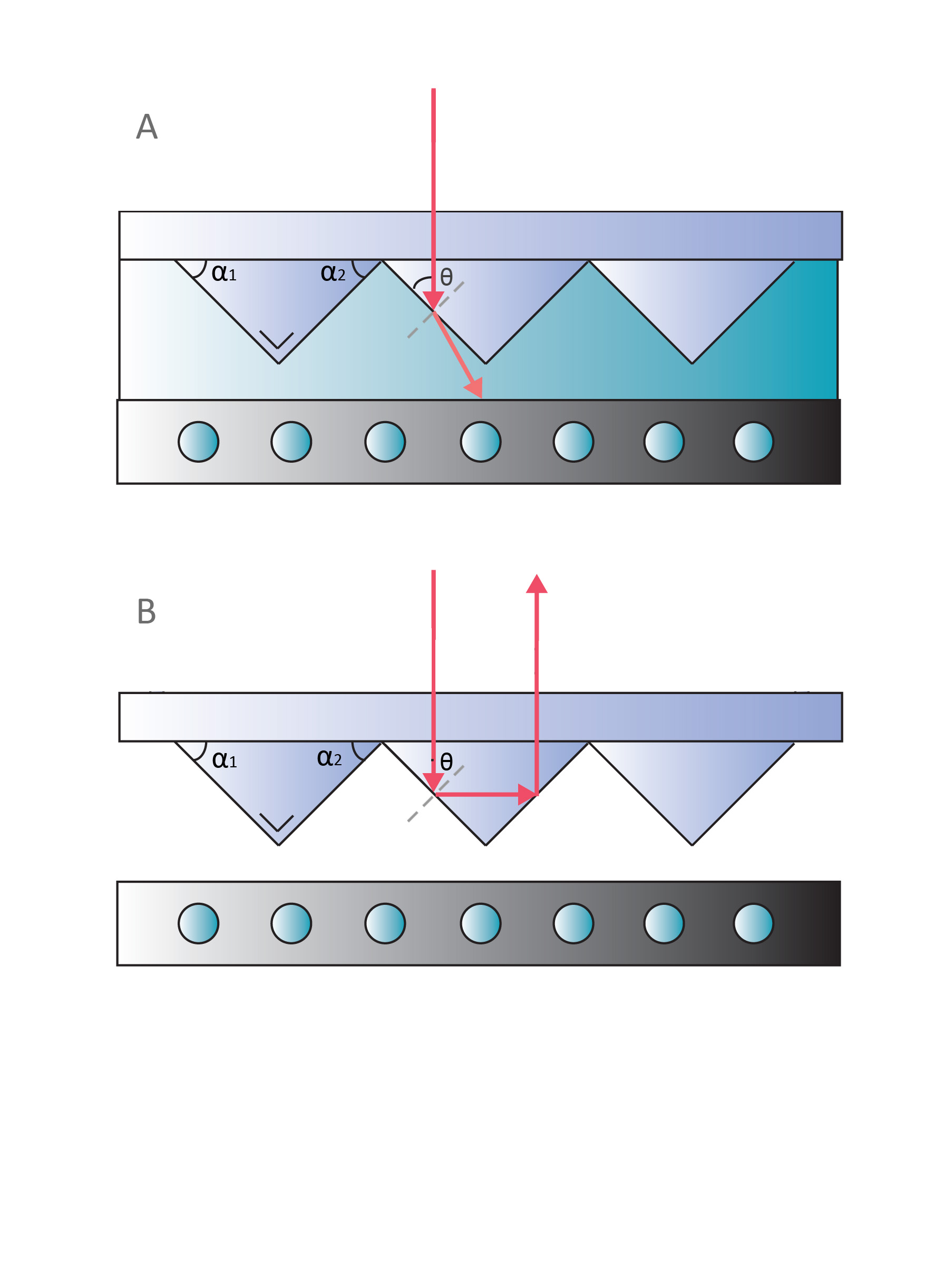
Working Principle of the Prismatic Optical Switch. When liquid is present in the switch, the switch behaves as if transparent. When there is no liquid present, the switch becomes reflective

According to Snell's law, light cannot escape from a medium when it strikes the medium boundary at an angle of incidence (θ) that is larger than the critical angle (θ_{c}), an optical phenomenon called Total Internal Reflection. The critical angle can be calculated using;

$\theta _{c}=Sin^{-1}(\frac{n_{1}}{n_{2}}),\; \frac{n_{1}}{n_{2}}\leq 1$

For a polycarbonate medium, with a refraction index of n=1.59, placed in an atmosphere of air with a refraction index close to 1, Total Internal Reflection occurs when θ > θ_{(c,air)}=39°.

Consider a polycarbonate prismatic structure with an apex angle α_{1,2}=45° placed in an atmosphere of air. A ray of light that strikes the medium boundary at normal incidence is total internal reflected, as θ_{in}=45°> θ_{(c,air)}=39°. In presence of water, θ_{(c,water)}=56.8° and θ_{in}=45°< θ_{(c,water)}, the incoming light is merely refracted and traverses the polycarbonate medium. As such, water acts as a switching fluid. In theory, water can be replaced by any other liquid, with an index of refraction close to that of the prismatic structure, to act as the switching fluid.

The optical switch consists of a self-regulating mechanism. In its passive state the switch is filled with liquid and light is allowed to pass through the switch and heat the system behind it. As the system heats up, the switching fluid evaporates out of the optical switch and the prismatic structure starts to behave as a reflective surface. No more light passes through the switch, limiting the maximum temperature of the system to the evaporation temperature of the liquid.

== Angular Dependence ==
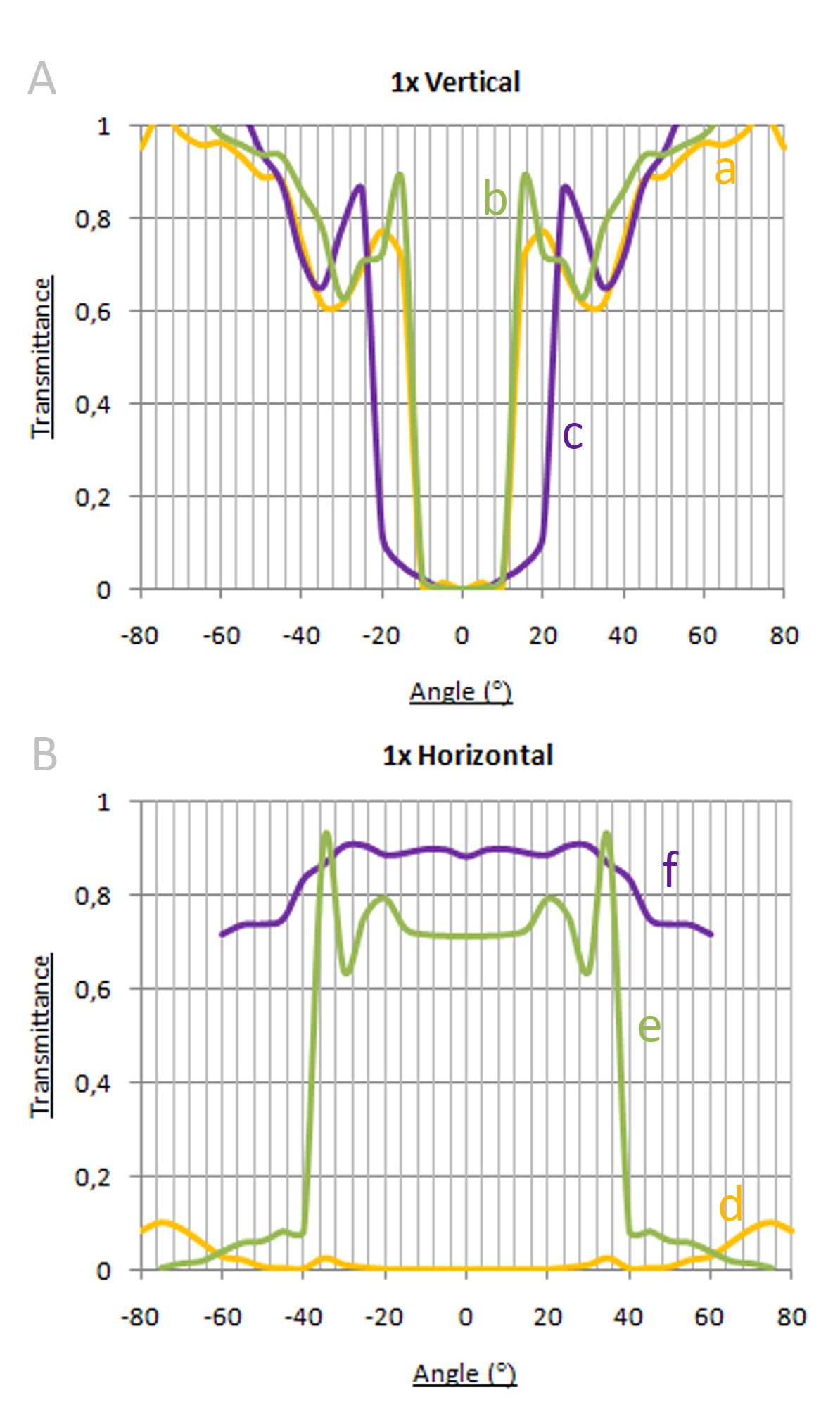
Transmittance of a prismatic array against day rotation(δ) (δ=0 stands for 12.00h, 15° equals 1 hour). The prisms are aligned such that the angle of incidence (θ) in mid-summer at noon. (A); Vertical alignment of the prismatic array for a mid-summer day (a) for a mid-autumn & mid-spring day (b), and for a mid-winter day (c). B; Horizontal alignment of the prismatic array for a mid-summer day (d), a mid-autumn & mid-spring day (e), and for a mid-winter day (f).

Resulting from its geometry, the optical switch is sensitive to the angle of the incident beam. Depending on the shape of the prisms, the transmittance of the switch in its reflective state during a typical day shows characteristic angular dependence. This dependence can be used to find specific transmission curves for different applications, where the geometry of the prisms serves as the input variable.

== Applications ==
The main application for which the optical switch was developed is overheating protection for solar thermal collectors. The prismatic geometry can be integrated within the cover plate of the collectors to prevent them from overheating, either by self-regulation through evaporation, or by draining the water out of the switch at a specified maximum temperature. Temperature limitation would allow for the use of polymeric materials within solar collectors, dramatically reducing cost-price and increasing market penetration.

Another application of the switch is in windows for both housing and office buildings. The amount of sunlight entering the building can be controlled by the switching liquid. Preventing the amount of sunlight entering a building will reduce the temperature inside the building on sunny days.

Finally, the switch can be used within roofs of greenhouses. The plants in the greenhouse can be protected from damage on sunny days by putting the switch in the reflective state. Currently greenhouses are covered with a chalk layer to protect the plants during summer from excessive sunlight. Applying the chalk layer is time-consuming and bad for the environment. Once the chalk is applied, it also blocks sunlight during less sunny days. The optical switch could potentially resolve this issue using the switching mechanism described above.

The temperature inside the greenhouse can be regulated by switching a certain amount of roof sections in the reflective state. Also the switching fluid inside the roof can be circulated to extract heat from the greenhouse. These cooling methods allow the (roof) windows to remain closed and that the climate (relative humidity and raised CO_{2} levels remain optimal and constant.

The switching fluid in the greenhouse roof can be used as a filter for a certain part of the solar spectrum. Water allows so-called "PAR" light (Photosynthetically active radiation, the light that plants use to grow) to pass, while "NIR" (Near Infra Red) light is absorbed. The amount of NIR light to absorb can be tuned by solving micro-particles of Copper Sulphate or clay in the switching fluid. In that way optimum growth conditions can be selected.

Some greenhouse products, like flowers, are grown by using artificial light during the night. This artificial light causes so-called light pollution in the environment of the greenhouse. When a greenhouse roof consists of a well designed optical switch the greenhouse roof becomes reflective during the night, which keeps the artificial light inside the greenhouse. As a side effect there are fewer lights needed since the roof acts as an efficient mirror.
