= Solar heat collector and radiator for building roof =

Heat collecting roof structure

A solar heat collector and radiator is a heat collecting and heat radiating roof structure, designed for building roofs specifically. It was built to be used in conjunction with solar energy and uses a system of air circulation for increased efficiency. A solar heat collector, or solar thermal collector, is used today to capture solar radiation through electromagnetic radiation with the use of solar hot water panels, solar parabolic troughs, or solar towers. Today many people create their own DIY solar heat collectors, but the inventor William Goettl was the first to design and patent this technology.

== Usage ==
William Goettl found in 1977 that many building roofs have heat collectors, often pipes, to warm up water or air for a building.

== Design ==
The Solar Heat Collector & Radiator for Building Roof consists of a U-shaped duct with cross-section, and upstanding flanges. The duct structures between adjacent rafters and provides an intermediate partition between upper areas of rafters. There is also a radiation-transparent convection shield above the cover plate to stop heat being lost air movement. William Goettl, of Goettl Air Conditioning, patented this technology in 1977 through the U.S. Patent Office with patent number US4098260. It has since been cited by five other patents and referenced by twenty-eight other patents, dating from 1977 to present day, including the modern model of a solar-powered water heating system designed by the Snyder National Corporation, and a solar heating panel by Solar Shelter Engineering Inc.

== History ==
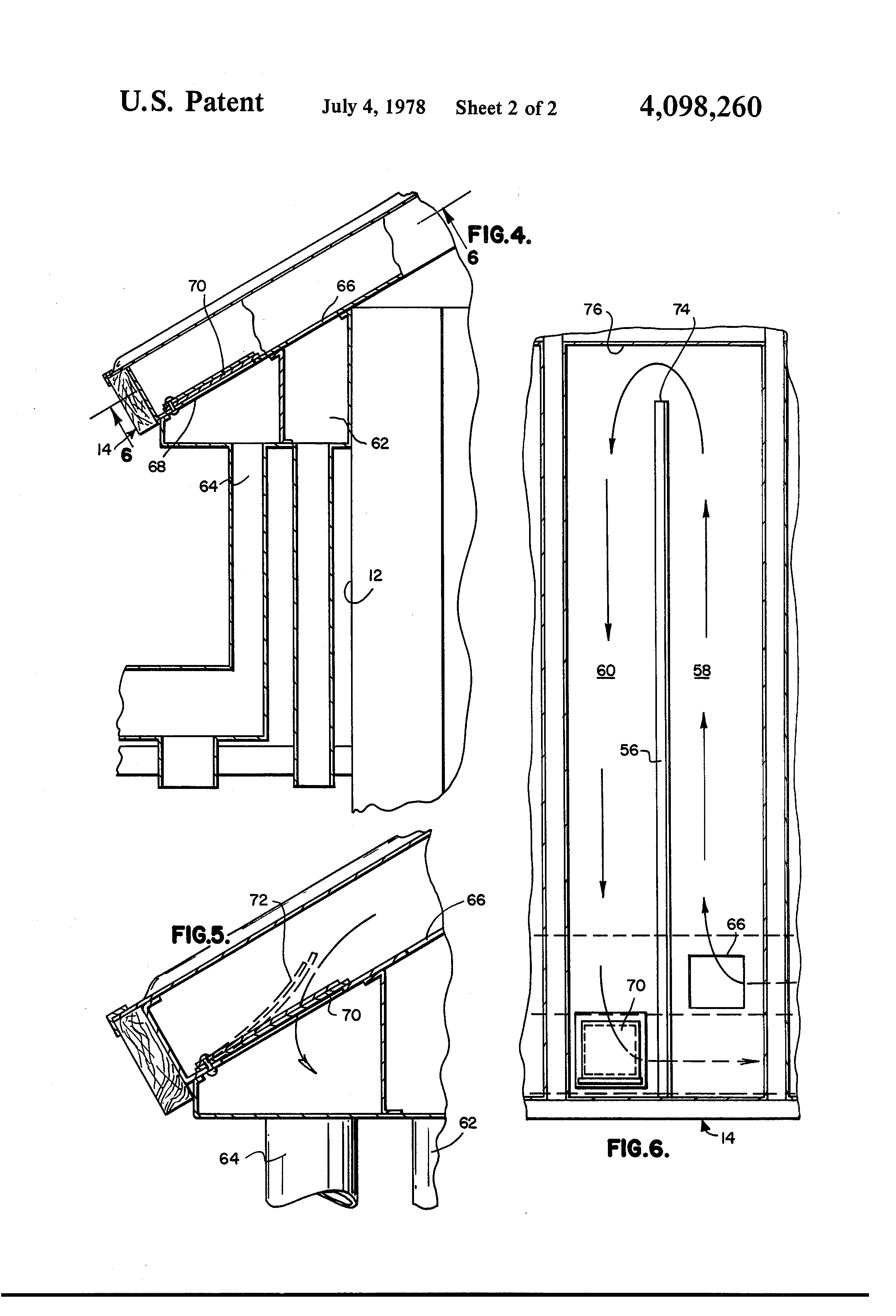
Figure 5 refers to an enlarged fragmentary sectional view of thermostatic control means intercommunicating with the roof duct structure and the delivery duct means of the invention, and Figure 6 refers to a fragmentary sectional view.

William H. Goettl was one of the original members of the Sheet Metal Air Rail and Transportation (SMART) charter. He was an instrumental founding role for the Sheet Metal Workers’ Local Union 359 in Arizona, especially when they were writing their original members’ charter in 1937. After moving out of sheet metal work, he invested in the Goettl Brothers Metal Products in Phoenix and took over as the company leader in 1946. Ten years later, he was elected as President of the Air Conditioning Contractors Association. By 1972, Goettl had become the largest HVAC contractor in the United States and started introducing significant patents to the industry. William Goettl filed for a patent for the Solar Heat Collector & Radiator for Building Roof on February 7, 1977 and his patent published on July 4, 1978.
