= Heat-transfer fluid =

Fluid used as an intermediary in a cooling or heating process

In fluid thermodynamics, a heat transfer fluid (HTF) is a gas or liquid that takes part in heat transfer by serving as an intermediary in cooling on one side of a process, transporting and storing thermal energy, and heating on another side of a process. Heat transfer fluids are used in countless applications and industrial processes requiring heating or cooling, typically in a closed circuit and in continuous cycles. Cooling water, for instance, cools an engine, while heating water in a hydronic heating system heats the radiator in a room.

Water is the most common heat transfer fluid because of its economy, high heat capacity and favorable transport properties. However, the useful temperature range is restricted by freezing below 0 °C and boiling at elevated temperatures depending on the system pressure. Antifreeze additives can alleviate the freezing problem to some extent. However, many other heat transfer fluids have been developed and used in a huge variety of applications. For higher temperatures, oil or synthetic hydrocarbon- or silicone-based fluids offer lower vapor pressure. Molten salts and molten metals can be used for transferring and storing heat at temperatures above 300 to 400 °C where organic fluids start to decompose. Gases such as water vapor, nitrogen, argon, helium and hydrogen have been used as heat transfer fluids where liquids are not suitable. For gases the pressure typically needs to be elevated to facilitate higher flow rates with low pumping power.

In order to prevent overheating, fluid flows inside a system or a device so as to transfer the heat outside that particular device or system.

They generally have a high boiling point and a high heat capacity. High boiling point prevents the heat transfer liquids from vaporising at high temperatures. High heat capacity enables a small amount of the refrigerant to transfer a large amount of heat very efficiently.

It must be ensured that the heat transfer liquids used should not have a low boiling point. This is because a low boiling point will result in vaporisation of the liquid at low temperatures when they are used to exchange heat with hot substances. This will produce vapors of the liquid in the machine itself where they are used.

Also, the heat transfer fluids should have high heat capacity. The heat capacity denotes the amount of heat the fluid can hold without changing its temperature. In case of liquids, it also shows the amount of heat the liquid can hold before its temperature reaches its boiling point and ultimately vaporises.

If the fluid has low heat capacity, then it will mean that a large amount of the fluid will be required to exchange a relatively small amount of heat. This will increase the cost of using heat transfer fluids and will reduce the efficiency of the process.

In case of liquid heat transfer fluids, usage of their small quantity will result in their vaporisation which can be dangerous for the equipment where they are used. The equipment will be designed for liquids but their vaporisation will include vapors in the flow channel. Also gases occupy larger volume than liquids at the same pressure. The production of vapors will increase the pressure on the walls of the pipe/channel where it will be flowing. This may cause the flow channel to rupture.

== Characteristics of heat transfer fluids ==
Low viscosity will help in easy flow of the fluid. It will further reduce the pumping costs.

The fluid chosen should not corrode the walls of the pipe through which it flows. This will reduce the maintenance costs of the equipment as fewer replacement of the pipes will be required.

High thermal conductivity and thermal diffusivity will increase the rate of heat transfer through the fluid.

The fluid should have high boiling and low freezing points. This will help the fluid to stay in the same phase while exchanging heat. This will also lower the equipment design complications.

== Compounds ==
Commonly used heat-transferring fluids include:

- Water
  - Water vapor
- Air
- Mono-ethylene glycol
- Propylene glycol
- Silicone oil

== See also ==
- Coolant
- Nanofluid § Smart cooling nanofluids
- Heat-transfer oil (oil cooling, oil heater)
