= Selective surface =

Surface with certain thermo-radiative properties

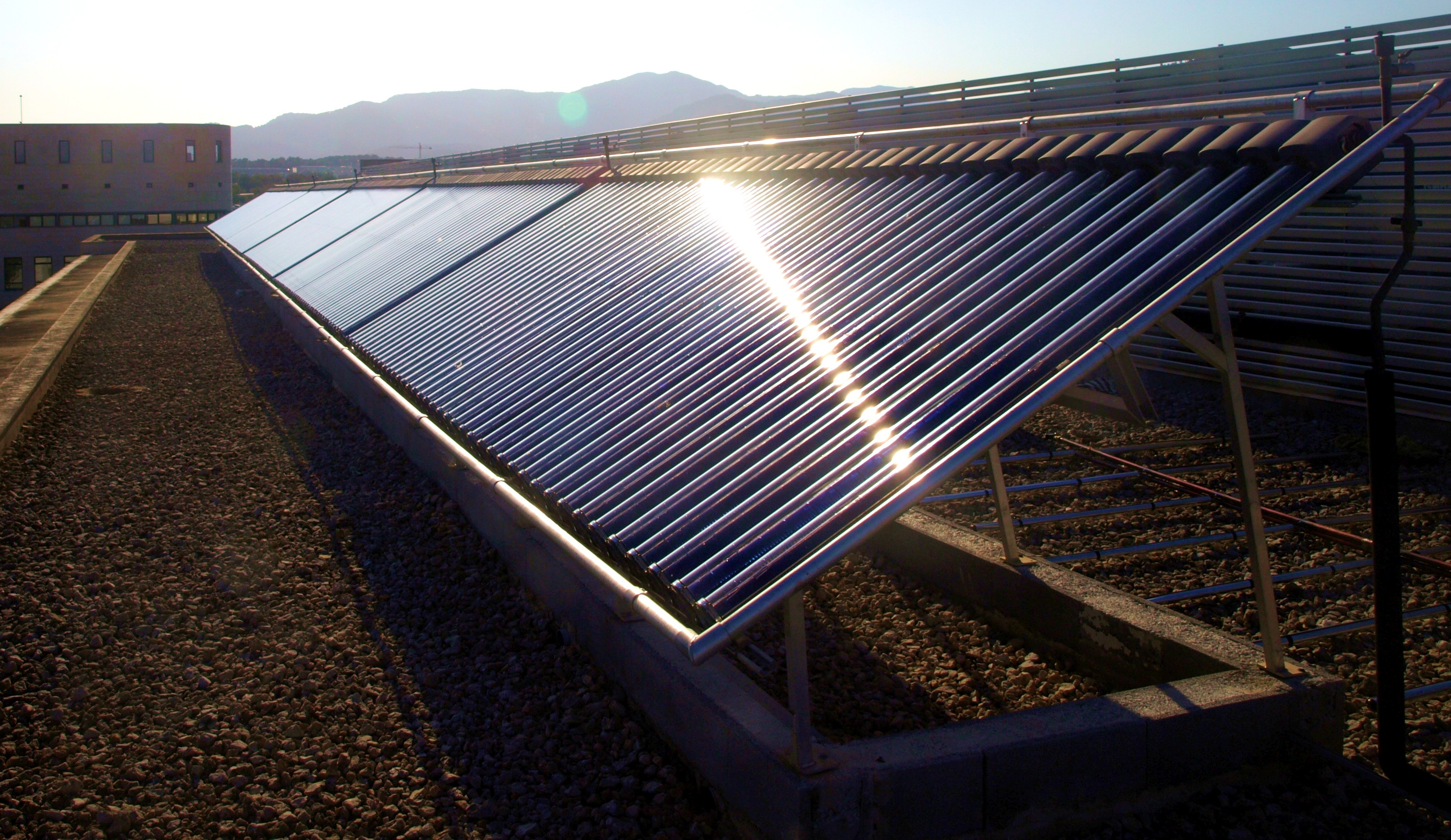
Solar thermal collector system based on evacuated glass tubes. Sunlight is absorbed by a special material at the center of each tube that has a selective surface. The surface absorbs sunlight nearly completely, and emits very little of the solar heat as thermal radiation. Ordinary black surfaces are also efficient absorbers, but they emit thermal radiation copiously.

In solar thermal collectors, a selective surface or selective absorber is a means of increasing its operating temperature and/or efficiency. The selectivity is defined as the ratio of solar radiation absorption (α_{sol}) to thermal infrared radiation emission (ε_{therm}).

Selective surfaces take advantage of the differing wavelengths of incident solar radiation and the emissive radiation from the absorbing surface:

- Solar radiation covers approximately the wavelengths 350 nm to 4000 nm; UV-A, visible and near infrared (NIR, or IR-A plus IR-B).
- Thermal infrared radiation, from materials with temperatures approximately in the interval -40 to 100 °C, covers approximately the wavelengths 4000 nm to 40,000 nm = 4 um to 40 um; The thermal infrared radiation interval being named or covered by: MIR, LWIR or IR-C.

== Materials ==
Normally, a combination of materials is used. One of the first selective surfaces investigated was a semiconductor-metal tandem – simply copper with a layer of black cupric oxide. Silicon on metal is also another example. A different design has ceramic–metal composites (cermets) on metal substrates. Black chromium ("black chrome") and nickel-plated anodized aluminum is another selective surface that is very durable, highly resistant to humidity or oxidizing atmospheres and extreme temperatures, while being able to retain its selective properties, but expensive. One of the more popular designs – a multi-layer broadband solar absorber – consists of a metal substrate coated with multiple layers of metal and dielectric materials. While those have to be vacuum-deposited, they have been widely adopted due to their suitability for vacuum tubes.

Although ordinary black paint has high solar absorption, it also has high thermal emissivity, and thus it is not a selective surface.

Typical values for a selective surface might be 0.90 solar absorption and 0.10 thermal emissivity, but can range from 0.8/0.3 for paints on metal to 0.96/0.05 for commercial surfaces. Thermal emissivities as low as 0.02 have been obtained in laboratories.

== Other applications ==
Selective surfaces are used for other applications than solar thermal collectors, such as low emissivity surfaces used in window glasses, which reflect thermal radiation and have high transmittance factors (being transparent) for visible sunlight.

== See also ==
- Insulated glazing
- Solar cooker
- Solar power
- Trombe wall
