= Nanofluid =

Fluid containing nanometer-sized particles, called nanoparticles

A nanofluid is a fluid containing nanometer-sized particles, called nanoparticles. These fluids are engineered colloidal suspensions of nanoparticles in a base fluid. The nanoparticles used in nanofluids are typically made of metals, oxides, carbides, or carbon nanotubes. Common base fluids include water, ethylene glycol, and oil.

Nanofluids have many potentially heat transfer applications, including microelectronics, fuel cells, pharmaceutical processes, and hybrid-powered engines, engine cooling/vehicle thermal management, domestic refrigerator, chiller, heat exchanger, in grinding, machining and in boiler flue gas temperature reduction. They exhibit enhanced thermal conductivity and convective heat transfer coefficient compared to the base fluid. Knowledge of the rheological behaviour of nanofluids is critical in deciding their suitability for convective heat transfer applications. Nanofluids also have special acoustical properties and in ultrasonic fields display shear-wave reconversion of an incident compressional wave; the effect becomes more pronounced as concentration increases.

In computational fluid dynamics (CFD), nanofluids can be assumed to be single phase fluids; however, almost all academic papers use a two-phase assumption. Classical theory of single phase fluids can be applied, where physical properties of nanofluid is taken as a function of properties of both constituents and their concentrations. An alternative approach simulates nanofluids using a two-component model.

The spreading of a nanofluid droplet is enhanced by the solid-like ordering structure of nanoparticles assembled near the contact line by diffusion, which gives rise to a structural disjoining pressure in the vicinity of the contact line. However, such enhancement is not observed for small droplets with diameter of nanometer scale, because the wetting time scale is much smaller than the diffusion time scale.

== Properties ==
Thermal conductivity, viscosity, density, specific heat, and surface tension are significant thermophysical properties of nanofluids. Parameters such as nanoparticle type, size, shape, volume concentration, fluid temperature, and nanofluid preparation method affect thermophysical properties.

- Viscosity
- Density
- Thermal conductivity

== Synthesis ==
Nanofluids are produced by several techniques:

- Direct Evaporation (1 step)
- Gas condensation/dispersion (2 step)
- Chemical vapour condensation (1 step)
- Chemical precipitation (1 step)
- Bio-based (2 step)

Base liquids include water, ethylene glycol, and oils have been used. Although stabilization can be a challenge, on-going research indicates that it is possible. Nano-materials used so far in nanofluid synthesis include metallic particles, oxide particles, carbon nanotubes, graphene nano-flakes and ceramic particles.

=== Bio-based ===
A biologically-based, environmentally friendly approach for the covalent functionalization of multi-walled carbon nanotubes (MWCNTs) using clove buds was developed. No toxic/hazardous acids are typically used in common carbon nanomaterial functionalization procedures, as employed in this synthesis. The MWCNTs are functionalized in one pot using a free radical grafting reaction. The clove-functionalized MWCNTs are then dispersed in distilled water (DI water), producing a highly stable MWCNT aqueous suspension (MWCNTs Nanofluid).

== Applications ==
Nanofluids are primarily used for their enhanced thermal properties as coolants in heat transfer equipment such as heat exchangers, electronic cooling system(such as flat plate) and radiators. Heat transfer over flat plate has been analyzed by many researchers. However, they are also useful for their controlled optical properties. Graphene based nanofluid has been found to enhance Polymerase chain reaction efficiency. Nanofluids in solar collectors is another application where nanofluids are employed for their tunable optical properties. Nanofluids have also been explored to enhance thermal desalination technologies, by altering thermal conductivity and absorbing sunlight, but surface fouling of the nanofluids poses a major risk to those approaches. Researchers proposed nanofluids for electronics cooling. Nanofluids also can be used in machining.

=== Smart cooling ===
One project demonstrated a class of magnetically polarizable nanofluids with thermal conductivity enhanced up to 300%. Fatty-acid-capped magnetite nanoparticles of different sizes (3-10 nm) were synthesized. It showed that the thermal and rheological properties of such magnetic nanofluids are tunable by varying magnetic field strength and orientation with respect to the direction of heat flow. Such response stimuli fluids are reversible and have applications in miniature devices such as micro- and nano-electromechanical systems.

A 2013 study considered the effect of an external magnetic field on the convective heat transfer coefficient of water-based magnetite nanofluid experimentally under laminar flow regime. It obtained up to 300% enhancement at Re=745 and magnetic field gradient of 32.5 mT/mm. The effect of the magnetic field on pressure was not as significant.

=== Sensing ===
A nanofluid-based ultrasensitive optical sensor changes its colour on exposure to low concentrations of toxic cations. The sensor is useful in detecting minute traces of cations in industrial and environmental samples. Existing techniques for monitoring cations levels in industrial and environmental samples are expensive, complex and time-consuming. The sensor uses a magnetic nanofluid that consists of nano-droplets with magnetic grains suspended in water. In a fixed magnetic field, a light source illuminates the nanofluid, changing its colour depending on the cation concentration. This color change occurs within a second after exposure to cations, much faster than other existing cation sensing methods.

Such responsive nanofluids can detect and image defects in ferromagnetic components. The so-called photonic eye is based on a magnetically polarizable nano-emulsion that changes colour when it comes into contact with a defective region in a sample. The device could monitor structures such as rail tracks and pipelines.

=== Nanolubricants ===
Nanolubricants modify oils used for engine and machine lubrication. Materials including metals, oxides and allotropes of carbon have supplied nanoparticles for such applications. The nanofluid enhances thermal conductivity and anti-wear properties. Although MoS_{2}, graphene, and Cu-based fluids have been studied extensively, fundamental understanding of underlying mechanisms is absent.

MoS_{2} and graphene work as third body lubricants, essentially acting as ball bearings that reduce the friction between surfaces. This mechanism requires sufficient particles to be present at the contact interface. The beneficial effects diminish because sustained contact pushes away the third body lubricants.

Other nanolubricant approaches, such as magnesium silicate hydroxides (MSH) rely on nanoparticle coatings by synthesizing nanomaterials with adhesive and lubricating functionalities. Research into nanolubricant coatings has been conducted in both the academic and industrial spaces. Nanoborate additives as well as mechanical model descriptions of diamond-like carbon (DLC) coating formations have been developed. Companies such as TriboTEX provide commercial formulations of synthesized MSH nanomaterial coatings for vehicle engine and industrial applications.

=== Petroleum refining ===
Many researches claim that nanoparticles can be used to enhance crude oil recovery.

=== Photonic crystals ===
Magnetic nanoparticle clusters or magnetic nanobeads of size 80–150 nanometers form ordered structures along the direction of an external magnetic field with a regular interparticle spacing on the order of hundreds of nanometers resulting in strong diffraction of visible light.

=== Flow battery ===
Nanoelectrofuel-based flow batteries (NFB) have been claimed to store 15 to 25 times as much energy as traditional flow batteries. The Strategic Technology Office of the U.S. Defense Advanced Research Projects Agency (DARPA) is exploring military's deployment of NFB in place of conventional lithium-ion batteries.

The nanofluid particles undergo redox reactions at the electrode. Particles are engineered to remain suspended indefinitely, comprising up to 80 percent of the liquid's weight with the viscosity of motor oil. The particles can be made from inexpensive minerals, such as ferric oxide (anode) and gamma manganese dioxide (cathode). The nanofluids use a nonflammable aqueous suspension. As of 2024 DARPA-funded Influit claimed to be developing a battery with an energy density of 550-850 wh/kg, higher than conventional lithium-ion batteries. A demonstration battery operated successfully between −40 °C and 80 °C.

Discharged nanofluids could be recharged while in a vehicle or after removal at a service station. Costs are claimed to be comparable to lithium ion. An EV-battery sized fuel reservoir (80 gallons) was expected to provide range comparable to a conventional gasoline vehicle. Fluids that escape, e.g., following a crash, turn into a pastelike substance, which can be removed and reused safely. Flow batteries also produce less heat, reducing their thermal signature for military vehicles.

== Nanoparticle migration ==
A 30-lab study reported that "no anomalous enhancement of thermal conductivity was observed in the limited set of nanofluids tested in this exercise". The COST funded research programme, Nanouptake (COST Action CA15119) was conducted with the intention "develop and foster the use of nanofluids as advanced heat transfer/thermal storage materials to increase the efficiency of heat exchange and storage systems". One 5-lab study reported that "there are no anomalous or unexplainable effects".

Despite these apparently conclusive experimental investigations theoretical papers continue to claim anomalous enhancement, particularly via Brownian and thermophoretic mechanisms. Brownian diffusion is due to the random drifting of suspended nanoparticles in the base fluid which originates from collisions between nanoparticles and liquid molecules. Thermophoresis induces nanoparticle migration from warmer to colder regions, again due to such collisions. A 2017 study considered the mismatch between experimental and theoretical results. It reported that Brownian motion and thermophoresis effects have no significant effects: their role is often amplified in theoretical studies due to the use of incorrect parameter values. Experimental validation of these assertions came in 2018 Brownian diffusion as a cause for enhanced heat transfer is dismissed in the discussion of the use of nanofluids in solar collectors.

== See also ==
- Argonne National Laboratory
- Flow battery
- Fluid dynamics
- Heat transfer
- Nanophase material
- Surface-area-to-volume ratio
- Surfactant
- Therminol
