= Therminol =

Synthetic heat transfer fluid

Therminol is a synthetic heat transfer fluid produced by Eastman Chemical Company.

Therminol fluids are used in a variety of applications, including:

- Hydrocarbon processing (oil and gas, refining, asphalt, gas-to-liquid, etc.)
- Alternative energy and technologies (concentrated solar power, biofuel, organic Rankine cycle, desalination, etc.)
- Plastics processing
- Chemical processing (pharmaceutical, environmental test chambers, etc.)
- Food and beverage processing
- Heat transfer system maintenance

Prior to 1997, Therminol fluids were sold in Europe under the trade names SantoTherm and GiloTherm. Since 1997, all forms of Therminol fluid have been sold with the Therminol name and extension to define its uses.

== History ==
Therminol heat transfer fluids were developed in 1963 by Monsanto. In 1997, the chemical businesses of Monsanto were spun off to form a new company called Solutia Inc. In 2012, Solutia was acquired by Eastman Chemical Company.

=== Polychlorinated biphenyl in Therminol ===
Prior to 1971, Monsanto marketed a series of polychlorinated biphenyl-(PCB)-containing heat transfer fluids designated as Therminol FR series in the United States and Santotherm FR series in Europe. FR series Therminol heat transfer fluids contained PCBs, which imparted fire resistance. Monsanto voluntarily ceased sales of these fluids in 1971. No form of Therminol heat transfer fluids have contained PCBs since that time. Polychlorinated biphenyl was banned by the United States Congress in 1979 and the Stockholm Convention on Persistent Organic Pollutants in 2001.
