= California =

U.S. state

- State
- Flag Seal
- Nickname: The Golden State
- Motto: "Eureka"
- Anthem: "I Love You, California"
- Location of California within the United States
- Country: United States
- Before statehood: Mexican Cession; Unorganized territory
- Admitted to the Union: September 9, 1850; 176 years ago (31st)
- Capital: Sacramento
- Largest city: Los Angeles
- Largest county or equivalent: Los Angeles
- Largest metro and urban areas: Greater Los Angeles

Government
  - Governor: Gavin Newsom (D)
  - Lieutenant Governor: Eleni Kounalakis (D)
- Legislature: State Legislature
  - Upper house: State Senate
  - Lower house: State Assembly
- Judiciary: Supreme Court of California
- U.S. senators: Alex Padilla (D); Adam Schiff (D)
- U.S. House delegation: 43 Democrats; 8 Republicans; 1 Independent; (list)

Area
  - Total: 163,700 sq mi (423,970 km^{2})
  - Land: 155,959 sq mi (403,932 km^{2})
  - Water: 7,740 sq mi (20,047 km^{2}) 4.7%
  - Rank: 3rd

Dimensions
  - Length: 760 mi (1,220 km)
  - Width: 250 mi (400 km)
- Elevation: 2,890 ft (880 m)
- Highest elevation (Mount Whitney (Note: Elevation adjusted to North American Vertical Datum of 1988) (Note: The summit of Mount Whitney is the highest point in the Contiguous United States.)): 14,504.6 ft (4,421.0 m)
- Lowest elevation (Badwater Basin): −278.9 ft (−85.0 m)

Population (2025)
  - Total: ▼39,355,309
  - Rank: 1st
  - Density: 250/sq mi (97/km^{2})
  - Rank: 11th
  - Median household income: ▲$95,500 (2023)
  - Income rank: 5th
- Demonyms: Californian; Californio (archaic Spanish); Californiano (Spanish)

Language
  - Official language: English
  - Spoken language: English (only): 56.1%; Spanish: 28.3%; Others: 15.6%
- Time zone: UTC−8 (PST)
  - Summer (DST): UTC−7 (PDT)
- USPS abbreviation: CA
- ISO 3166 code: US-CA
- Traditional abbreviation: Calif., Cal., Cali.
- Latitude: 32°32′ N to 42° N
- Longitude: 114°8′ W to 124°26′ W
- Website: ca.gov

State symbols of California
List of state symbols

Living insignia
- Amphibian: California red-legged frog
- Bird: California quail
- Crustacean: Dungeness crab
- Fish: Fresh water: Golden trout; Marine: Garibaldi
- Flower: California poppy
- Fruit: Avocado
- Grass: Purple needlegrass
- Insect: California dogface butterfly
- Mammal: Land: California grizzly bear (state animal); Marine: Gray whale
- Mushroom: California Golden Chanterelle
- Reptile: Desert tortoise
- Tree: Coast redwood; Giant sequoia
- Vegetable: Artichoke

Inanimate insignia
- Colors: Blue & Gold
- Dance: West Coast Swing
- Dinosaur: Augustynolophus
- Folk dance: Square dance
- Fossil: Sabre-toothed cat
- Gemstone: Benitoite
- Mineral: Native gold
- Rock: Serpentine
- Ship: Californian
- Soil: San Joaquin
- Sport: Surfing
- Tartan: California state tartan

State route marker

State quarter
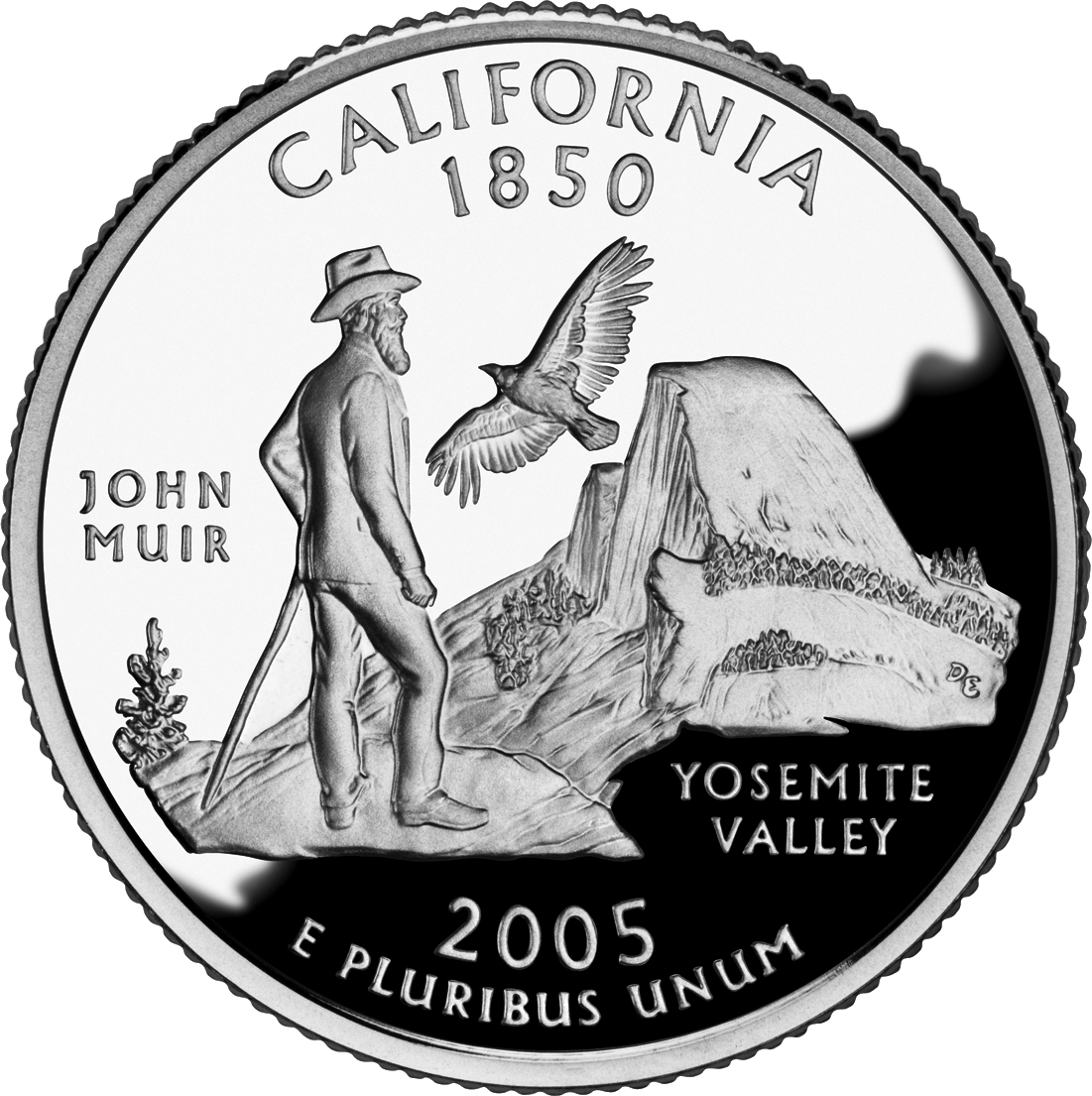
- Released in 2005

California is a state in the Western United States. It is bordered by Oregon to the north, the Mexican state of Baja California to the south, Nevada to the east, Arizona to the southeast, and the Pacific Ocean to the west. With a population of over 39 million across an area of 163,696 square miles (423,970 km^{2}), it is the most populous U.S. state and the third largest by land area.

Before European colonization, California was one of the most culturally and linguistically diverse areas in pre-Columbian North America. European exploration in the 16th and 17th centuries led to the colonization by the Spanish Empire. The area became a part of Mexico in 1821, as a result of its successful war for independence. Following the U.S. conquest of California, part of the Mexican-American War, California was ceded to the United States in 1848. The California gold rush started in 1848 and led to social and demographic changes, including the California genocide. It organized itself and was admitted as the 31st state in 1850 as a free state, following the Compromise of 1850.

Greater Los Angeles and the San Francisco Bay Area are the nation's second and fifth most populous combined statistical areas. Los Angeles is the state's most populous city and is ranked second in population in the nation. California's capital is Sacramento. Part of the Californias region of North America, the state's diverse geography ranges from the Pacific Coast and metropolitan areas in the west to the Sierra Nevada mountains in the east, and from the redwood and Douglas fir forests in the northwest to the Mojave Desert in the southeast. Two-thirds of the nation's earthquake risk lies in California. The Central Valley, a fertile agricultural area, dominates the state's center. The large size of the state results in climates that vary from moist temperate rainforest in the north to arid desert in the interior, as well as snowy alpine in the mountains. While California is warming and drying overall, with frequent wildfires, the state is also experiencing increasing weather whiplash.

The economy of California is the largest of any U.S. state, with an estimated 2025 gross state product of $4.296 trillion as of Q3 2025. It is also the world's largest sub-national economy and, if it were an independent country, would be the fourth-largest economy in the world (behind Germany and ahead of Japan) by nominal GDP as of 2025. The state's agricultural industry leads the nation in output, fueled by its production of dairy, almonds, and grapes. Despite heavy reliance on seaborne foreign crude oil, California also refines some of its own oil, primarily drilled from Kern County. With the busiest port in the country (Los Angeles), California plays a pivotal role in the global supply chain, hauling in about 40% of goods imported to the US. Notable contributions to popular culture, ranging from entertainment, sports, music, and fashion, have their origins in California. The state also has made substantial contributions in the fields of communication, information, innovation, education, environmentalism, entertainment, economics, politics, technology, and religion.

California is known for its contributions to the American film industry, hippie counterculture, beach and car culture, the personal computer, the internet, fast food, diners, burger joints, skateboarding, and the fortune cookie, among other inventions. Despite an exodus of filmmaking from California, Hollywood continues to be an important center of the U.S. film industry, one of the oldest and largest film industries in the world; profoundly influencing global entertainment since the 1920s. The San Francisco Bay Area's Silicon Valley is the center of the global technology industry.

== Etymology ==
The name is most likely derived from the mythical island of California in the fictional story of Queen Calafia, as recorded in a 1510 work The Adventures of Esplandián by Garci Rodríguez de Montalvo. Queen Calafia's kingdom was said to be a remote land rich in gold and pearls, inhabited by beautiful dark-skinned women who wore gold armor and lived like Amazons, and bred griffins for war.

A 2017 state legislative document stated, "Numerous theories exist as to the origin and meaning of the word 'California'", and that all anyone knows is the name was added to a map by 1541 "presumably by a Spanish navigator".

The Spaniards gave the name Las Californias to the peninsula of Baja California (in modern-day Mexico). As Spanish explorers and settlers moved north and inland, the region known as "California", or "Las Californias", grew in both area and population. Eventually it included lands north of the peninsula, Alta California, part of which became the present-day U.S. state of California.

Abbreviations of the state's name include CA (U.S. Postal Service and ANSI), Cal, Calif, CF (U.S. Coast Guard), and US-CA (ISO).

== History ==
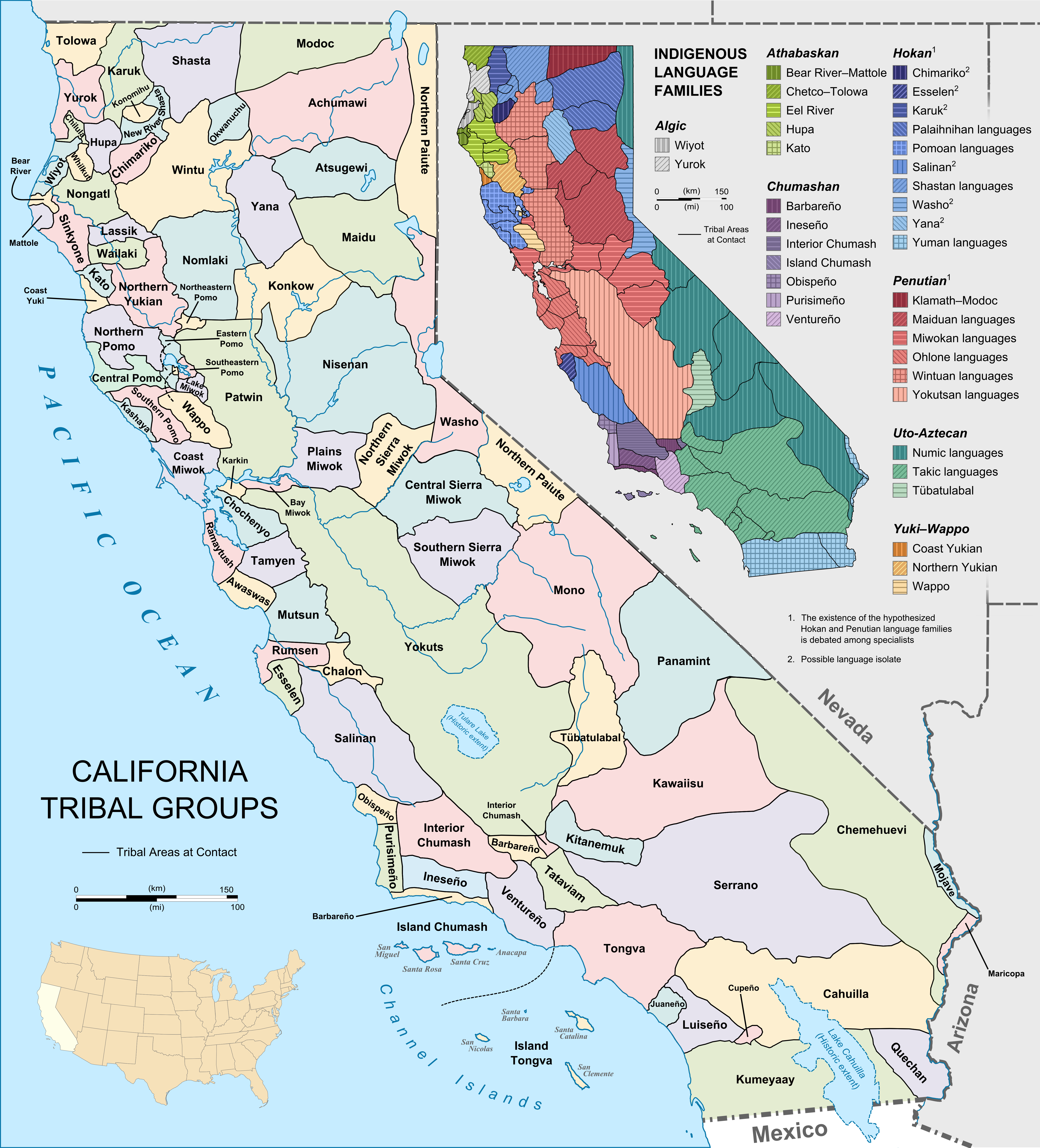
A map of Indigenous Californian tribes and languages at the time of European contact.

=== Indigenous tribes ===
California was one of the most culturally and linguistically diverse areas in pre-Columbian North America. Historians generally agree that there were at least 300,000 people living in California before European colonization. The Indigenous peoples of California included more than 70 distinct ethnic groups, inhabiting environments ranging from mountains and deserts to islands and redwood forests.

Living in these diverse geographic areas, the Indigenous peoples developed complex forms of ecosystem management, including forest gardening to ensure the regular availability of important food sources and medicinal plants. This was a form of sustainable agriculture. To mitigate destructive large wildfires from ravaging the natural environment, Indigenous peoples developed a practice of controlled burning. This practice was recognized for its benefits by the California government in 2022.

These groups were also diverse in their political organization, with bands, tribes, villages, and, on the resource-rich coasts, large chiefdoms, such as the Chumash, Pomo and Salinan. Trade, intermarriage, craft specialists, and military alliances fostered social and economic relationships between many groups. Although nations would sometimes war, most armed conflicts were between groups of men for vengeance. Acquiring territory was not usually the purpose of these small-scale battles.

Men and women generally had different roles in society. Women were often responsible for weaving, harvesting, processing, and preparing food, while men for hunting and other forms of physical labor. Most societies also had roles for people whom the Spanish referred to as joyas, who they saw as "men who dressed as women". Joyas were responsible for death, burial, and mourning rituals, and they performed women's social roles. Indigenous societies had terms such as two-spirit to refer to them. The Chumash referred to them as 'aqi. The early Spanish settlers detested and sought to eliminate them.

=== Spanish period ===
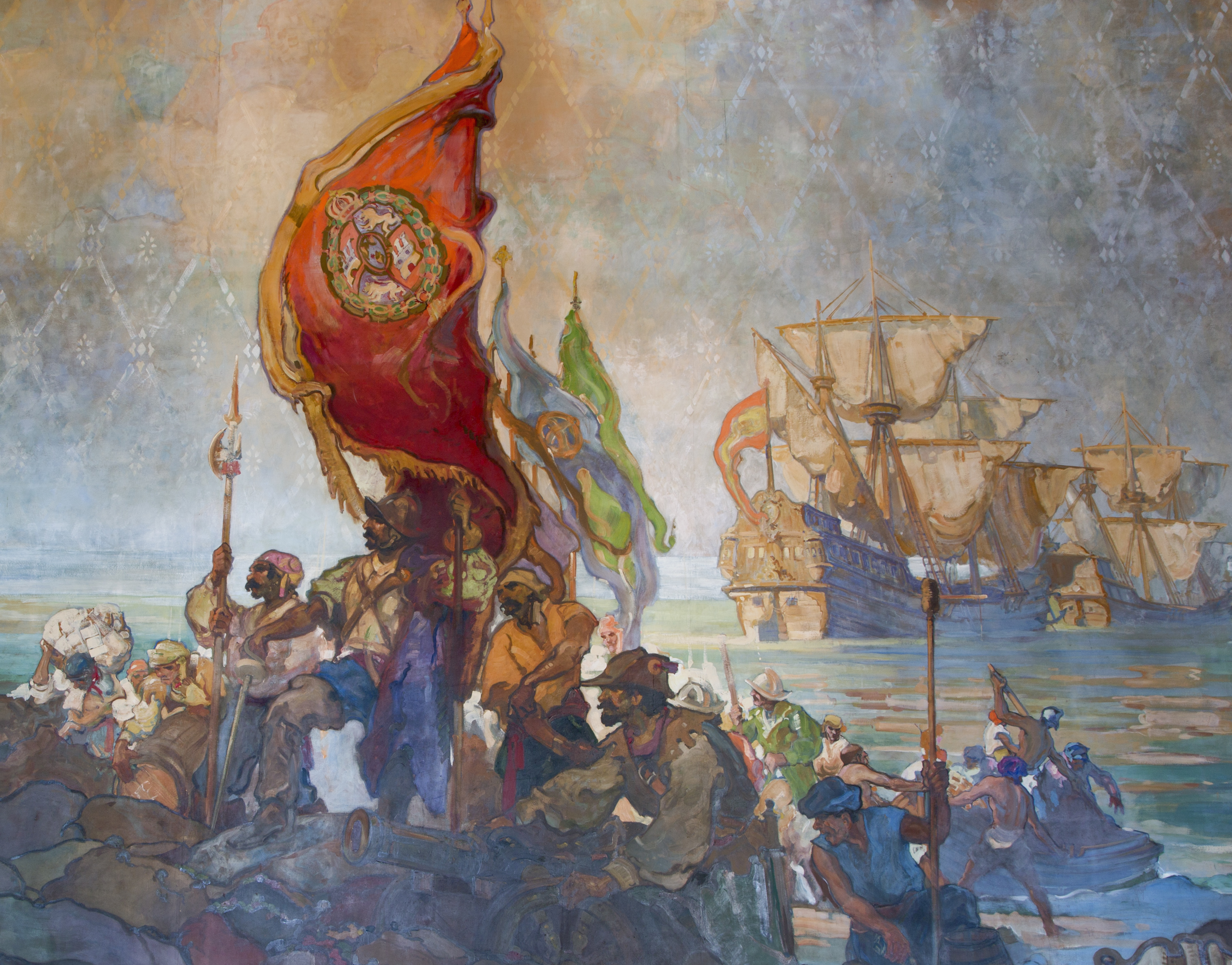
Portuguese explorer Juan Rodríguez Cabrillo claiming California for the Spanish Empire in 1542

The first Europeans to explore the coast of California were the members of a Spanish maritime expedition led by Portuguese captain Juan Rodríguez Cabrillo in 1542. Cabrillo was commissioned by Antonio de Mendoza, the Viceroy of New Spain, to lead an expedition up the Pacific coast in search of trade opportunities; they entered San Diego Bay on September 28, 1542, and reached at least as far north as San Miguel Island. English privateer and explorer Francis Drake explored and claimed an undefined portion of the California coast in 1579, landing north of the future city of San Francisco. The first documented Asians to set foot on what is now the United States occurred in 1587, when Filipino sailors arrived in Spanish ships at Morro Bay.

Descendants of the Islamic Caliph Hasan ibn Ali, who had been living in formerly Muslim Manila, transited through California while traveling to Guerrero, Mexico. These individuals, who had converted to Christianity while retaining some Islamic traditions, later played a role in Mexico's wars of independence. Sebastián Vizcaíno explored and mapped the coast of California in 1602 for New Spain, putting ashore in Monterey. Despite the on-the-ground explorations of California in the 16th century, Rodríguez's idea of California as an island persisted. Such depictions appeared on many European maps well into the 18th century.

The Portolá expedition of 1769–70 was a pivotal event in the Spanish colonization of California, resulting in the establishment of numerous missions, presidios, and pueblos. The military and civil contingent of the expedition was led by Gaspar de Portolá, who traveled over land from Sonora into California, while the religious component was headed by Junípero Serra, who came by sea from Baja California. In 1769, Portolá and Serra established Mission San Diego de Alcalá and the Presidio of San Diego, the first religious and military settlements founded by the Spanish in California. By the end of the expedition in 1770, they would establish the Presidio of Monterey and Mission San Carlos Borromeo de Carmelo on Monterey Bay.

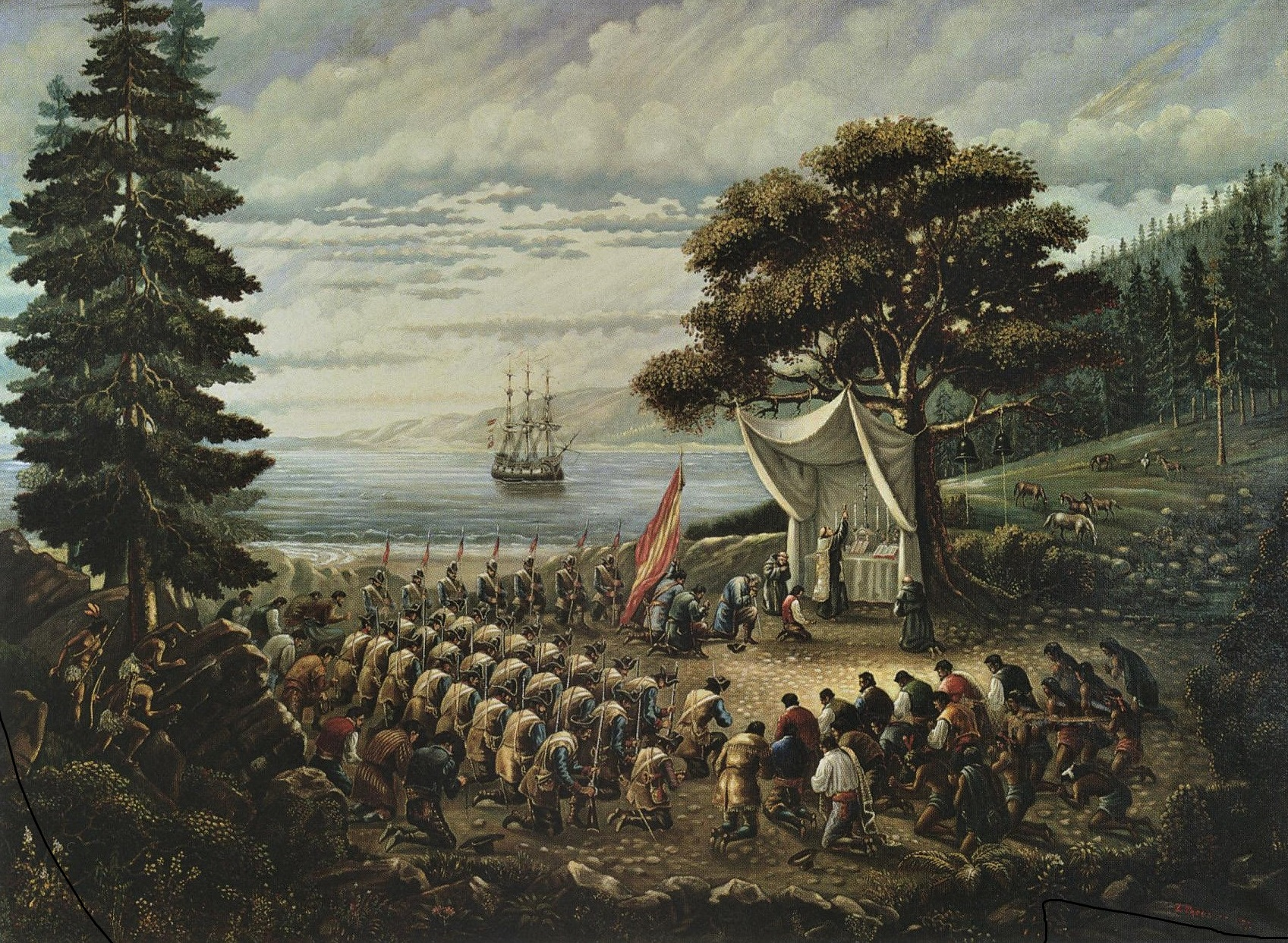
Junípero Serra conducting the first Mass in Monterey Bay in 1770

After the Portolà expedition, Spanish missionaries led by Father-President Serra set out to establish 21 Spanish missions of California along El Camino Real ("The Royal Road") and along the California coast, 16 sites of which having been chosen during the Portolá expedition. Numerous major cities in California grew out of missions, including San Francisco (Mission San Francisco de Asís), San Diego (Mission San Diego de Alcalá), Ventura (Mission San Buenaventura), and Santa Barbara (Mission Santa Barbara), among others.

Juan Bautista de Anza led a significant expedition throughout California in 1775–76, which would extend deeper into the interior and north of California. The Anza expedition selected numerous sites for missions, presidios, and pueblos, which subsequently would be established by settlers. Gabriel Moraga, a member of the expedition, would also christen many of California's prominent rivers with their names in 1775–1776, such as the Sacramento River and the San Joaquin River. After the expedition, Gabriel's son, José Joaquín Moraga, founded the pueblo of San Jose in 1777, making it the first civilian-established city in California.

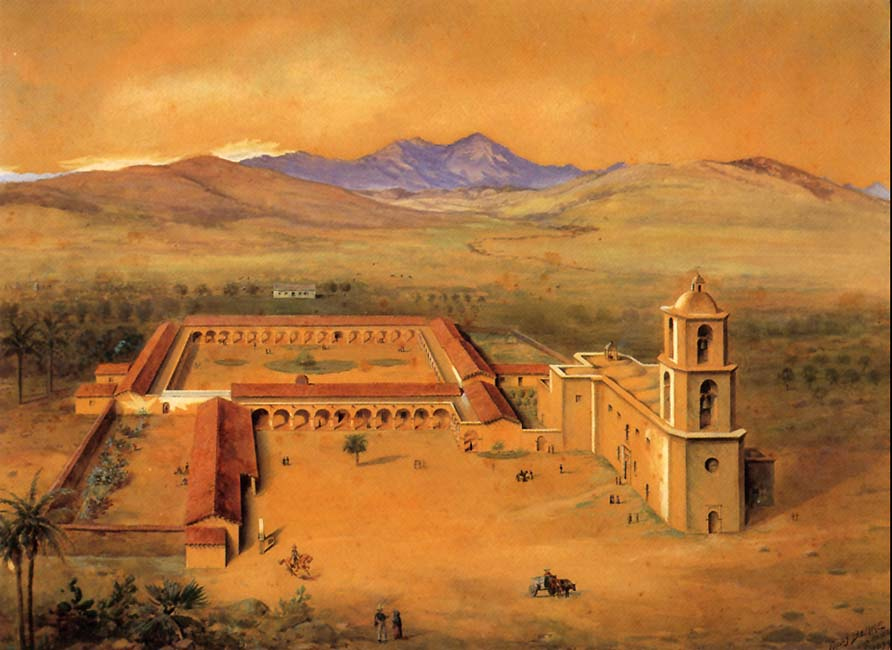
The Spanish founded Mission San Juan Capistrano in 1776, the third to be established of California's missions.

During this same period, sailors from the Russian Empire explored along the northern coast of California. In 1812, the Russian-American Company established a trading post and small fortification at Fort Ross on the North Coast. Fort Ross was primarily used to supply Russia's Alaskan colonies with food supplies. The settlement did not meet much success, failing to attract settlers or establish long term trade viability, and was abandoned by 1841.

During the War of Mexican Independence, Alta California was largely unaffected and uninvolved in the revolution, though many Californios supported independence from Spain, which many believed had neglected California and limited its development. Spain's trade monopoly on California had limited local trade prospects. Following Mexican independence, California ports were freely able to trade with foreign merchants. Governor Pablo Vicente de Solá presided over the transition from Spanish colonial rule to independent Mexican rule.

=== Mexican period ===
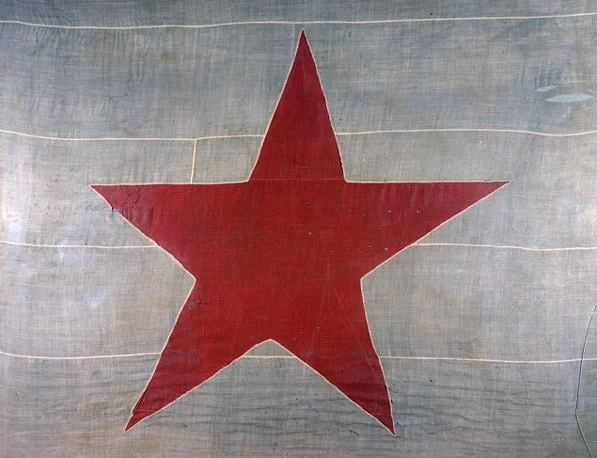
The flag used by Californio leader Juan Bautista Alvarado's 1836 California independence movement

In 1821, the Mexican War of Independence gave the Mexican Empire (which included California) independence from Spain. In 1822, the California's first legislature was formed, known as the Diputación de Alta California. The California mission system, which controlled much of the best land in Alta California, was secularized by 1834 and became the property of the Mexican government. The governor granted many square leagues of land to others with political influence. These huge ranchos or cattle ranches emerged as the dominant institutions of Mexican California. The ranchos developed under ownership by Californios (Hispanics native of California) who traded cowhides and tallow with Boston merchants. Beef did not become a commodity until the 1849 California Gold Rush.

From the 1820s, trappers and settlers from the U.S. and Canada began to arrive in Northern California. These new arrivals used the Siskiyou Trail, California Trail, Oregon Trail and Old Spanish Trail to cross the rugged mountains and harsh deserts in and surrounding California. The early government of the newly independent Mexico was highly unstable, and in a reflection of this, from 1831 onwards, California also experienced a series of armed disputes, both internal and with the central Mexican government. During this tumultuous political period Juan Bautista Alvarado was able to secure the governorship during 1836–1842. The military action which first brought Alvarado to power had momentarily declared California to be an independent state, and had been aided by Anglo-American residents of California, including Isaac Graham. In 1840, one hundred of those residents who did not have passports were arrested, leading to the Graham Affair, which was resolved in part with the intercession of Royal Navy officials.

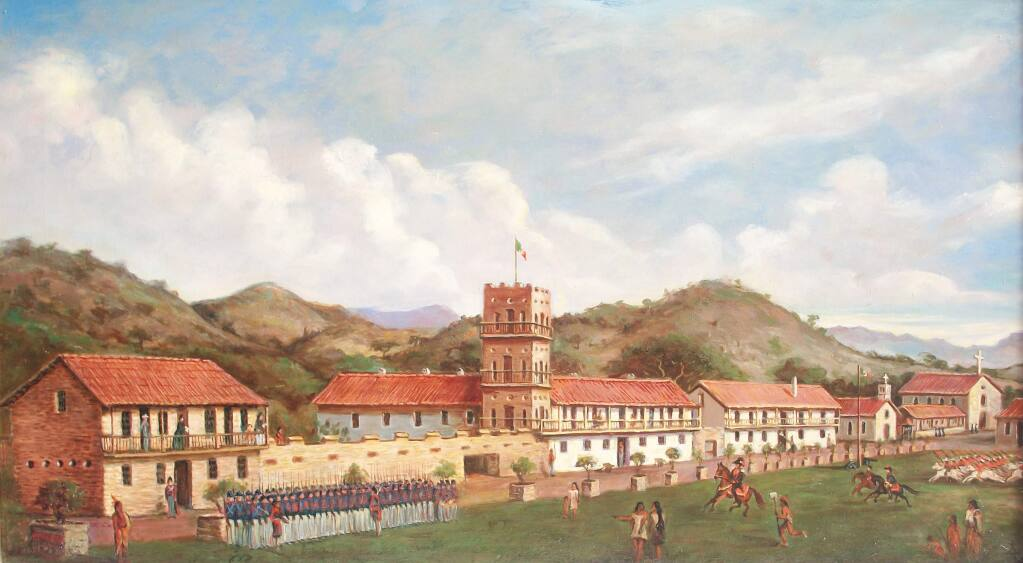
General Mariano G. Vallejo reviewing his troops in the Sonoma Plaza, 1846

One of the largest ranchers in California was John Marsh. After failing to obtain justice against squatters on his land from the Mexican courts, he determined that California should become part of the United States. Marsh conducted a letter-writing campaign espousing the California climate, the soil, and other reasons to settle there, as well as the best route to follow, which became known as "Marsh's route". His letters were read, reread, passed around, and printed in newspapers throughout the country, and started the first wagon trains rolling to California.

After ushering in the period of organized emigration to California, Marsh became involved in a military battle between the much-hated Mexican general, Manuel Micheltorena and the California governor he had replaced, Juan Bautista Alvarado. At the Battle of Providencia near Los Angeles, he convinced each side that they had no reason to be fighting each other. As a result of Marsh's actions, they abandoned the fight, Micheltorena was defeated, and California-born Pio Pico was returned to the governorship. This paved the way for California's ultimate acquisition by the U.S.

=== U.S. conquest and the California Republic ===
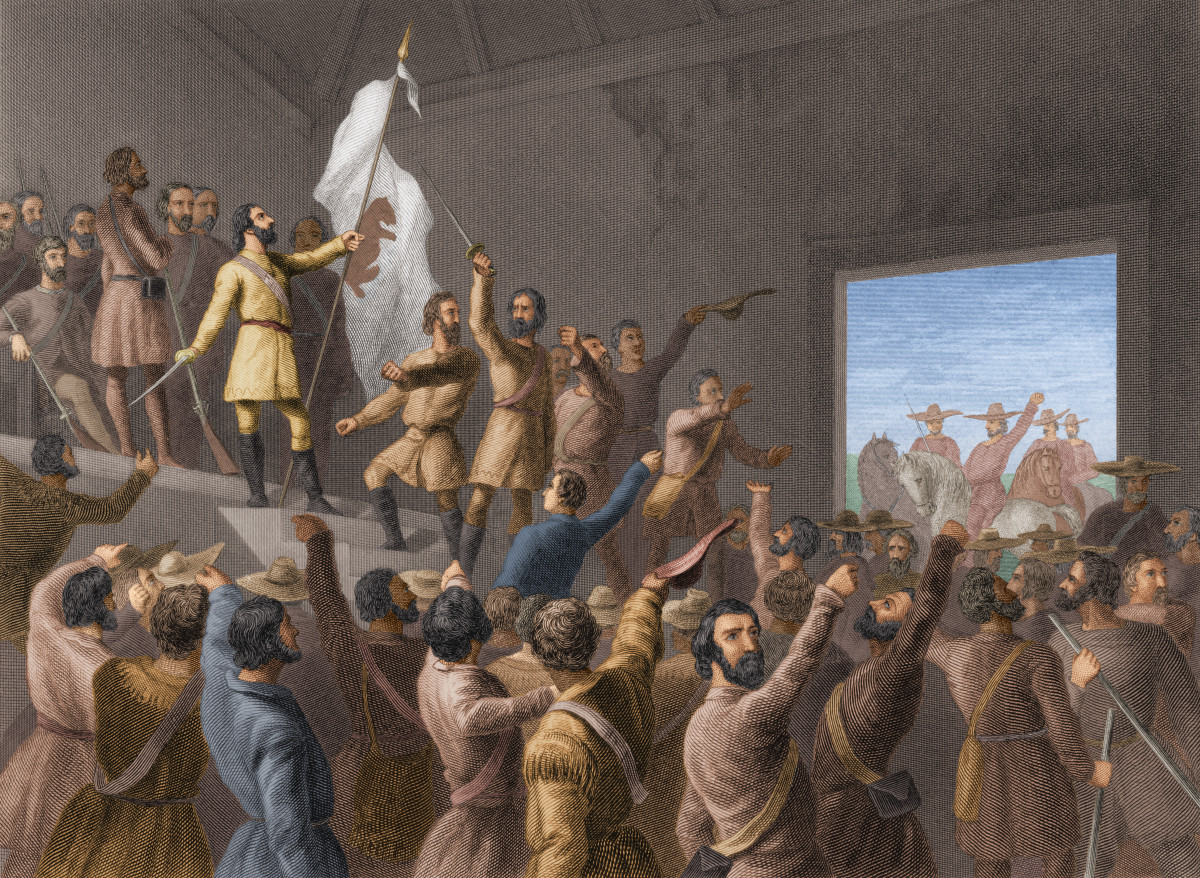
The 1846 Bear Flag Revolt declared the California Republic and prefaced the American conquest of California.

In 1846, a group of American settlers in and around Sonoma rebelled against Mexican rule during the Bear Flag Revolt. Afterward, rebels raised the Bear Flag (featuring a bear, a star, a red stripe and the words "California Republic") at Sonoma. The Republic's only president was William B. Ide, who played a pivotal role during the Bear Flag Revolt. This revolt by American settlers served as a prelude to the later American military invasion of California and was closely coordinated with nearby American military commanders.

The California Republic was short-lived; the same year marked the outbreak of the Mexican–American War (1846–1848).

Commodore John D. Sloat of the U.S. Navy sailed into Monterey Bay in 1846 and began the U.S. military invasion of California, with Northern California capitulating in less than a month to the U.S. forces. In Southern California, Californios continued to resist American forces. Notable military engagements of the conquest include the Battle of San Pasqual and the Battle of Dominguez Rancho in Southern California, as well as the Battle of Olómpali and the Battle of Santa Clara in Northern California. After a series of defensive battles in the south, the Treaty of Cahuenga was signed by the Californios on January 13, 1847, securing a censure and establishing de facto American control in California.

=== Early American period ===
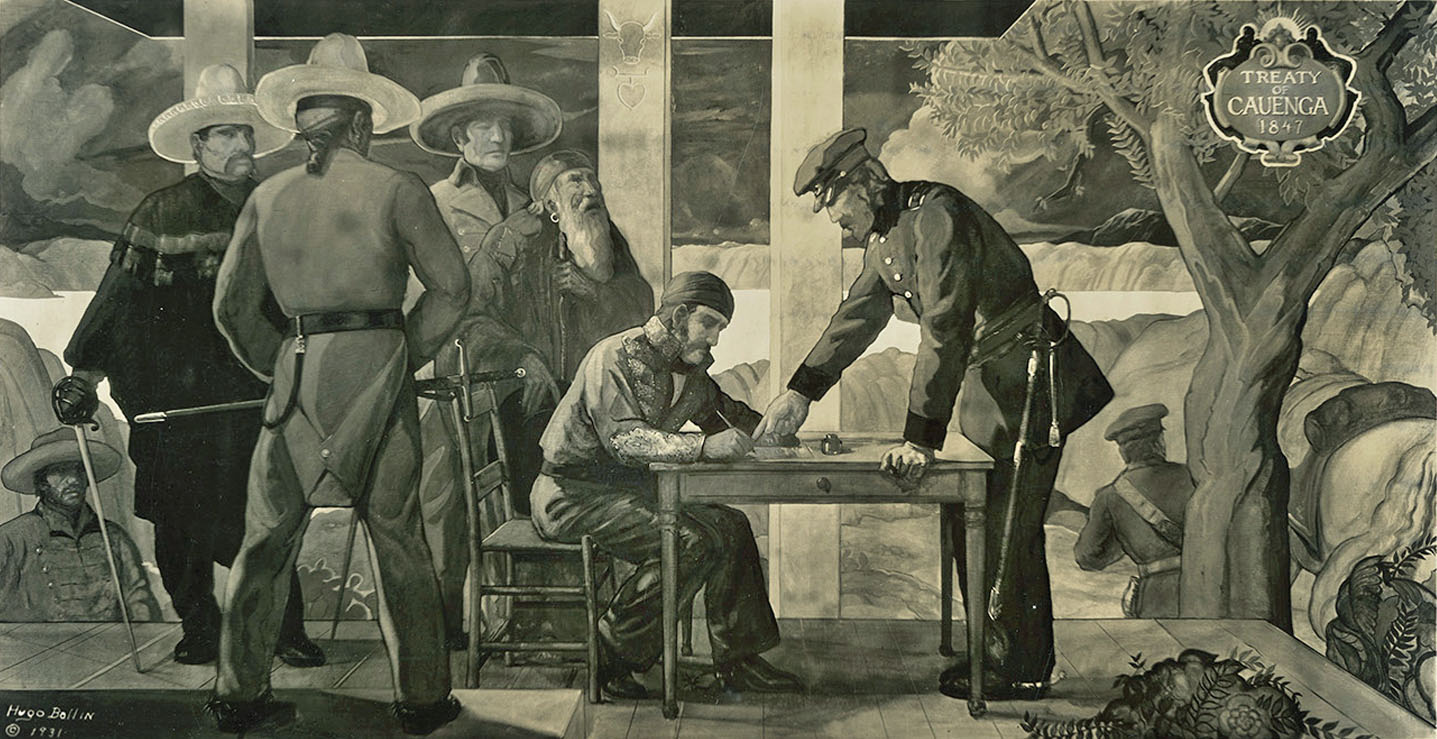
The Treaty of Cahuenga, signed in 1847 by Californio Andrés Pico and American John C. Frémont, was a ceasefire that ended the U.S. conquest of California.

Following the Treaty of Guadalupe Hidalgo (February 2, 1848) that ended the war, the westernmost portion of the annexed Mexican territory of Alta California soon became the American state of California, and the remainder of the old territory was then subdivided into the American Territories of Arizona, Nevada, Colorado and Utah. The even more lightly populated and arid lower region of old Baja California remained as a part of Mexico. In 1846, the total settler population of the western part of the old Alta California had been estimated to be no more than 8,000, plus about 100,000 Native Americans, down from about 300,000 before Hispanic settlement in 1769.

In 1848, gold was discovered at Sutter's Mill, just weeks prior to the formal transfer of California to the United States under the Treaty of Guadalupe Hidalgo. This monumental event triggered the California gold rush—one of the largest mass migrations in modern history. The ensuing population boom permanently transformed the region's economy and demographics, as hundreds of thousands of fortune-seekers from the eastern United States, Europe, Latin America, and Asia flooded the territory. By the time of California's application for statehood in 1850, the settler population of California had multiplied to 100,000. By 1854, more than 300,000 settlers had come. Between 1847 and 1870, the population of San Francisco increased from 500 to 150,000.

California Gold Rush

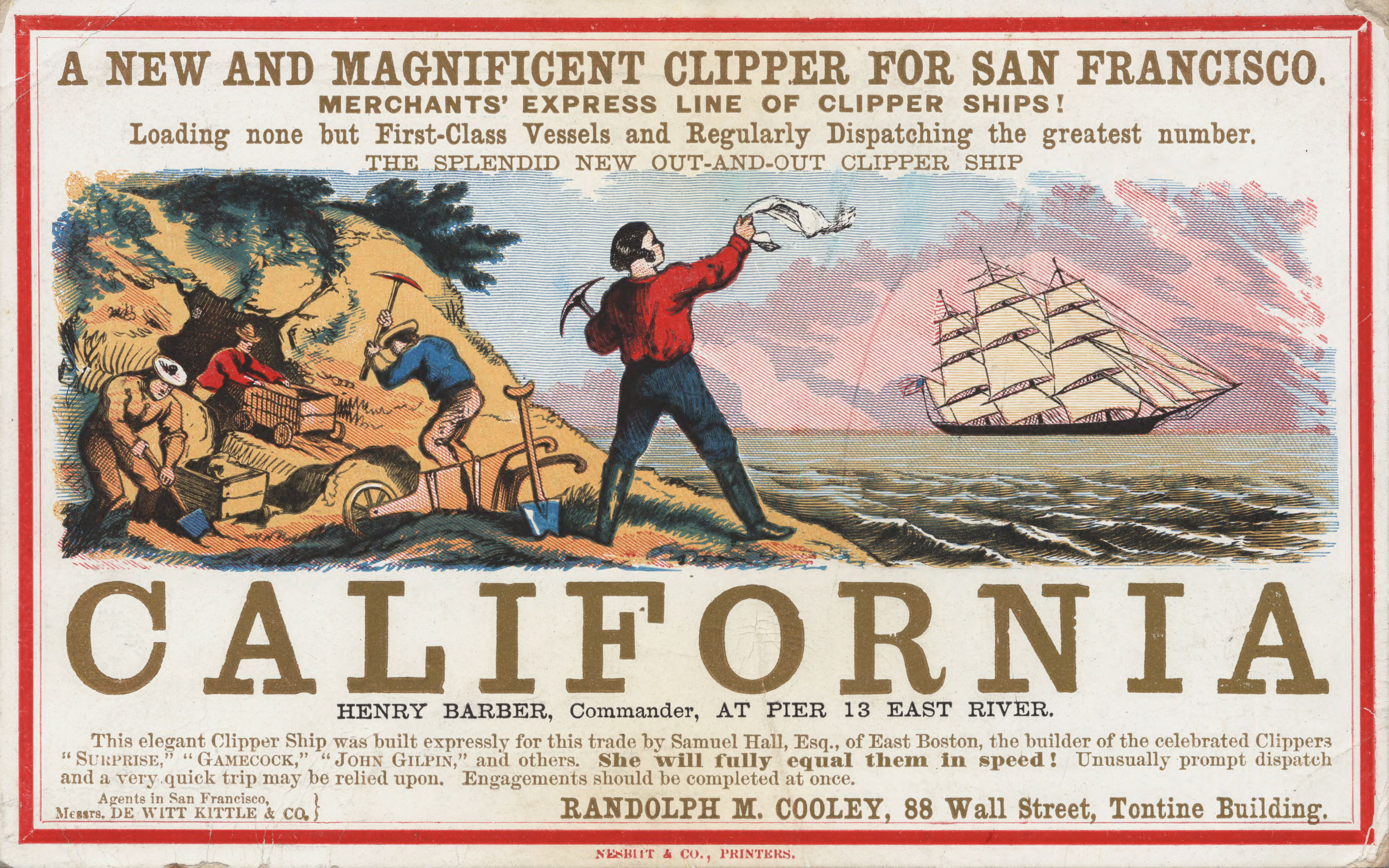
An ad to sail to California, c. 1850

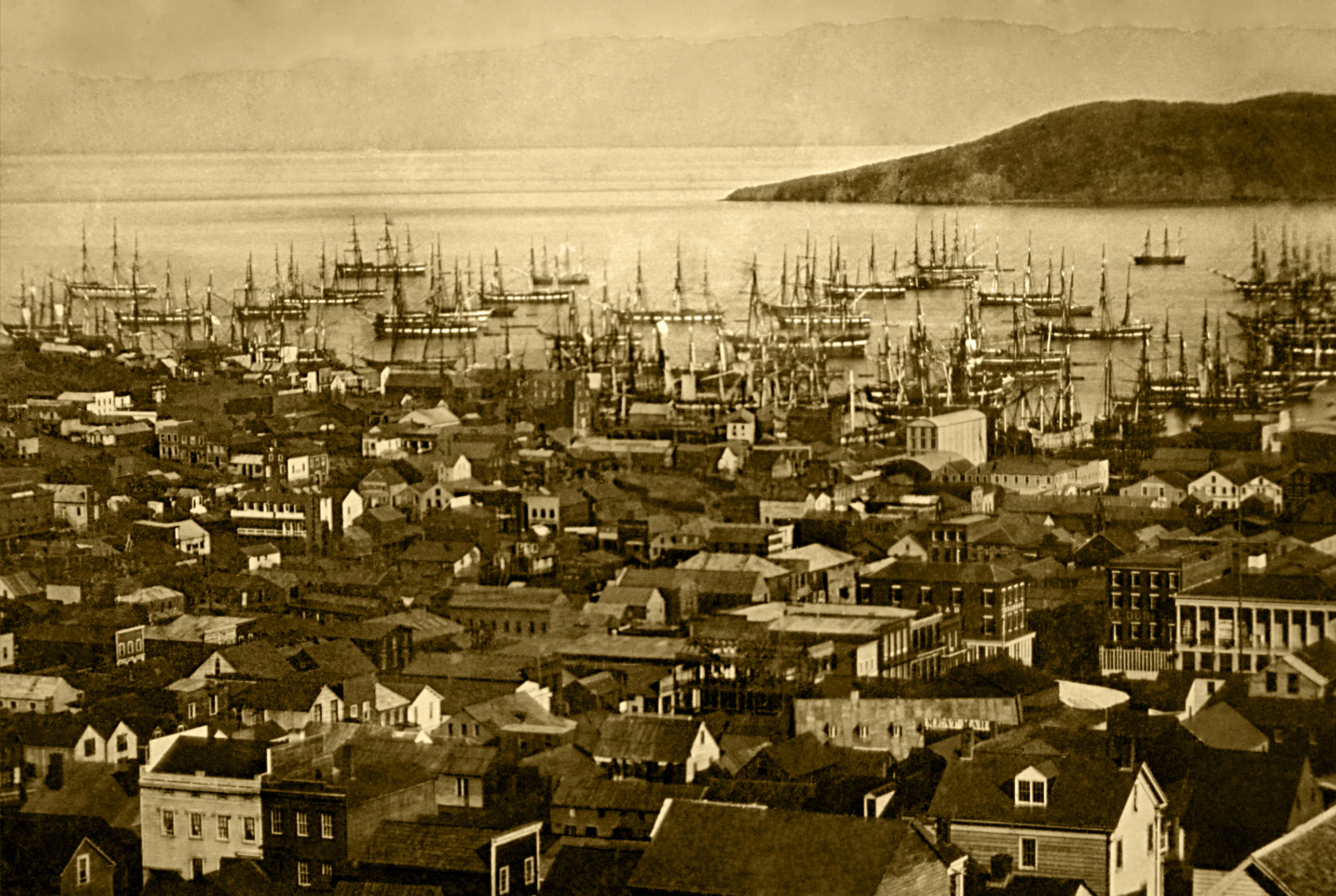
San Francisco harbor, c. 1850–51

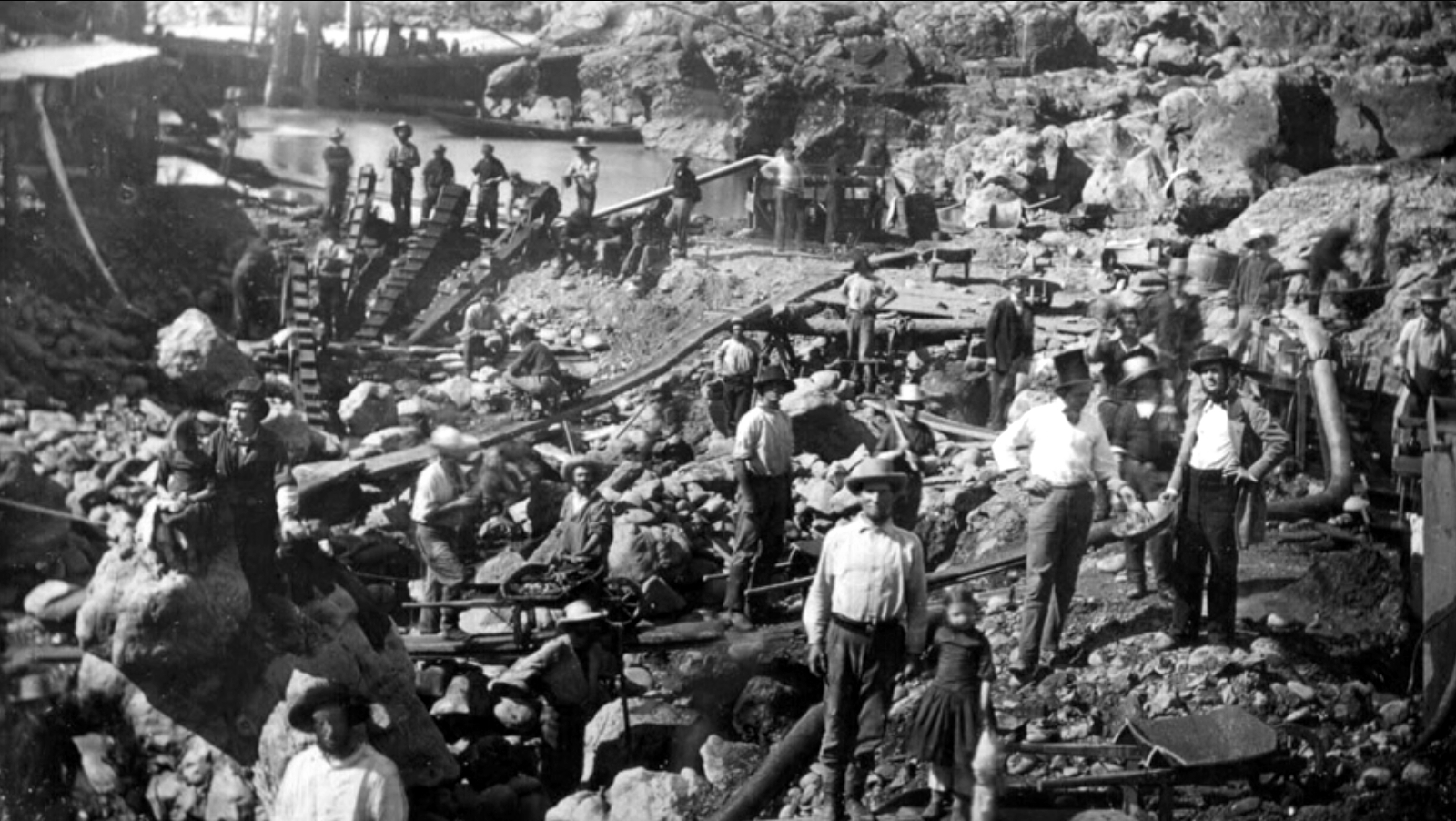
Mining near Sacramento, c. 1852

The seat of government for California under Spanish and later Mexican rule had been located in Monterey from 1777 until 1845. Pio Pico, the last Mexican governor of Alta California, had briefly moved the capital to Los Angeles in 1845. The U.S. consulate had also been located in Monterey, under consul Thomas O. Larkin.

In 1849, a state Constitutional Convention was first held in Monterey. Among the first tasks of the convention was a decision on a location for the new state capital. The first full legislative sessions were held in San Jose (1850–1851). Subsequent locations included Vallejo (1852–1853), and nearby Benicia (1853–1854); these locations eventually proved to be inadequate as well. The capital has been located in Sacramento since 1854 with only a short break in 1862 when legislative sessions were held in San Francisco due to flooding in Sacramento. Once the state's Constitutional Convention had finalized its state constitution, it applied to the U.S. Congress for admission to statehood. On September 9, 1850, as part of the Compromise of 1850, California became a free state and September 9 a state holiday.

During the American Civil War (1861–1865), California sent gold shipments eastward to Washington in support of the Union. However, due to the existence of a large contingent of pro-South sympathizers within the state, the state was not able to muster any full military regiments to send eastwards to officially serve in the Union war effort. Still, several smaller military units within the Union army, such as the "California 100 Company", were unofficially associated with the state of California due to a majority of their members being from California.

At the time of California's admission into the Union, travel between California and the rest of the continental U.S. had been a time-consuming and dangerous feat. Nineteen years later, and seven years after it was greenlighted by President Lincoln, the first transcontinental railroad was completed in 1869. California was then reachable from the eastern States in a week's time.

Much of the state was well suited to fruit cultivation and agriculture in general. Vast expanses of wheat, other cereal crops, vegetable crops, cotton, and nut and fruit trees were grown (including oranges in Southern California), and the foundation was laid for the state's prodigious agricultural production in the Central Valley and elsewhere.

In the nineteenth century, a large number of migrants from China traveled to the state as part of the gold rush or to seek work. Even though the Chinese proved indispensable in building the transcontinental railroad from California to Utah, perceived job competition with the Chinese led to anti-Chinese riots in the state, and eventually the U.S. ended migration from China partially as a response to pressure from California with the 1882 Chinese Exclusion Act.

==== California genocide ====
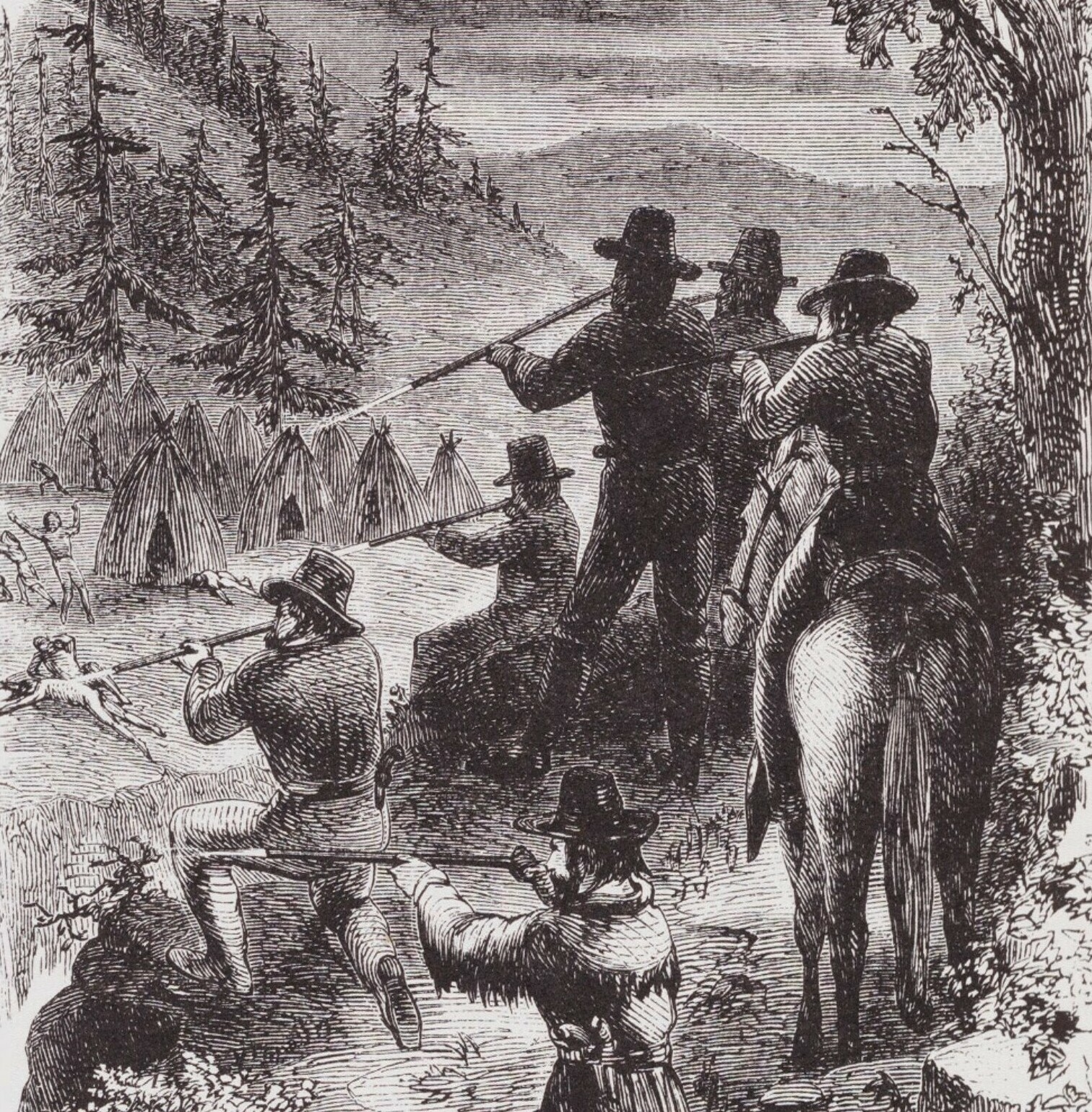
Between 1846 and 1873, U.S. government agents and private settlers perpetrated many massacres against Indigenous Californians, known as the California genocide. At least 9,456 were killed with estimates as high as 100,000 deaths.

Under earlier Spanish and Mexican rule, California's original native population had precipitously declined, above all, from Eurasian diseases to which the Indigenous people of California had not yet developed a natural immunity. Under its new American administration, California's first governor Peter Hardeman Burnett instituted policies that have been described as a state-sanctioned policy of elimination of California's Indigenous people. Burnett announced in 1851 in his Second Annual Message to the Legislature: "That a war of extermination will continue to be waged between the races until the Indian race becomes extinct must be expected. While we cannot anticipate the result with but painful regret, the inevitable destiny of the race is beyond the power and wisdom of man to avert."

As in other American states, Indigenous peoples were forcibly removed from their lands by American settlers, like miners, ranchers, and farmers. Although California had entered the American union as a free state, the "loitering or orphaned Indians", were de facto enslaved by their new Anglo-American masters under the 1850 Act for the Government and Protection of Indians. One of these de facto slave auctions was approved by the Los Angeles City Council and occurred for nearly twenty years. There were many massacres in which hundreds of Indigenous people were killed by settlers for their land.

Between 1850 and 1860, the California state government paid around 1.5 million dollars (some 250,000 of which was reimbursed by the federal government) to hire militias with the stated purpose of protecting settlers, however these militias perpetrated numerous massacres of Indigenous people. Indigenous people were also forcibly moved to reservations and rancherias, which were often small and isolated and without enough natural resources or funding from the government to adequately sustain the populations living on them. As a result, settler colonialism was a calamity for Indigenous people. Several scholars and Native American activists, including Benjamin Madley and Ed Castillo, have described the actions of the California government as a genocide, as well as the 40th governor of California Gavin Newsom. Benjamin Madley estimates that from 1846 to 1873, between 9,492 and 16,092 Indigenous people were killed, including between 1,680 and 3,741 killed by the U.S. Army.

=== 1900–present ===
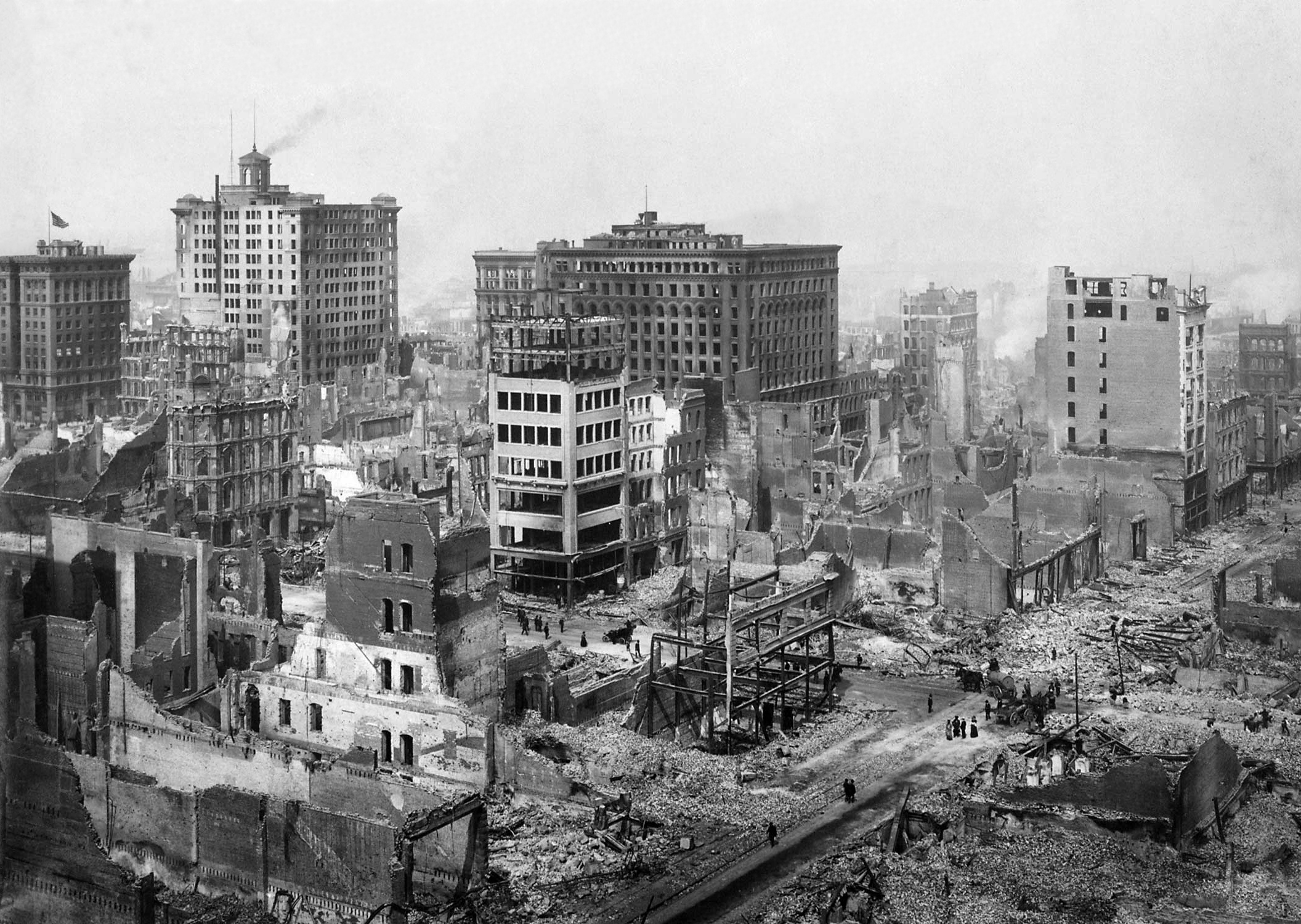
View of the destruction from the 1906 San Francisco earthquake

In the 20th century, thousands of Japanese people migrated to California. In 1913, the state passed the Alien Land Act, excluding Asian immigrants from owning land. During World War II, Japanese Americans in California were interned in concentration camps; in 2020, California apologized.

Migration to California accelerated during the early 20th century with the completion of transcontinental highways like the Route 66. From 1900 to 1965, the population grew from fewer than one million to the greatest in the Union. In 1940, the U.S. Census Bureau reported California's population as 6% Hispanic, 2.4% Asian, and 90% non-Hispanic white.

To meet the population's needs, engineering feats like the California and Los Angeles Aqueducts; the Oroville and Shasta Dams; and the Bay and Golden Gate Bridges were built. The state government adopted the California Master Plan for Higher Education in 1960 to develop an efficient system of public education.

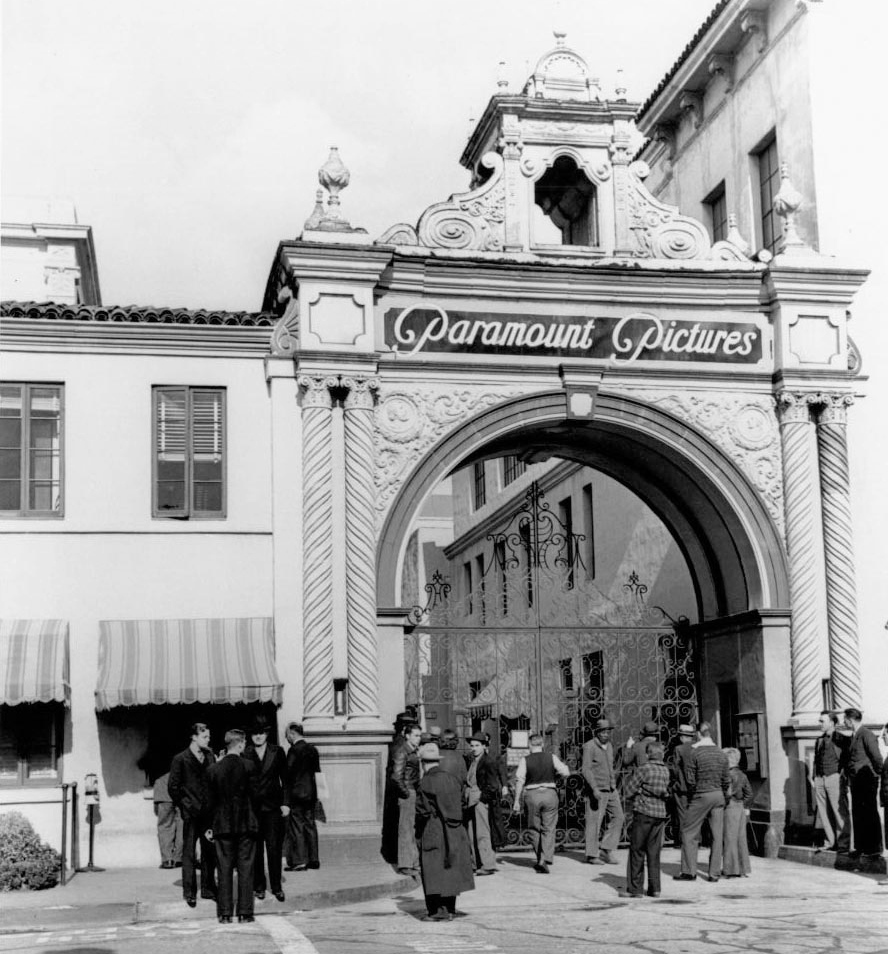
In the early 20th century, Hollywood studios, like Paramount Pictures, helped transform Hollywood into the world capital of film and helped solidify Los Angeles as a global economic hub.

Meanwhile, attracted to the mild Mediterranean climate, cheap land, and the state's variety of geography, filmmakers established the studio system in Hollywood in the 1920s. California manufactured 9% of U.S. armaments produced during World War II, ranking third behind New York and Michigan. California easily ranked first in production of military ships at drydock facilities in San Diego, Los Angeles, and the San Francisco Bay Area. Due to the hiring opportunities California offered during the conflict, the population multiplied from the immigration it received due to the work in its war factories, military bases, and training facilities.

After World War II, California's economy expanded due to strong aerospace and defense industries, whose size decreased following the end of the Cold War. Stanford University began encouraging faculty and graduates to stay instead of leaving the state, and develop a high-tech region, now known as Silicon Valley. As a result of this, California is a world center of the entertainment and music industries, of technology, engineering, and the aerospace industry, and as the U.S. center of agricultural production. Just before the Dot Com Bust, California had the fifth-largest economy in the world.

In the mid and late twentieth century, race-related incidents occurred. Tensions between police and African Americans, combined with unemployment and poverty in inner cities, led to riots, such as the 1992 Rodney King riots. California was the hub of the Black Panther Party, known for arming African Americans to defend against racial injustice. Mexican, Filipino, and other migrant farm workers rallied in the state around Cesar Chavez for better pay in the 1960s and 70s.

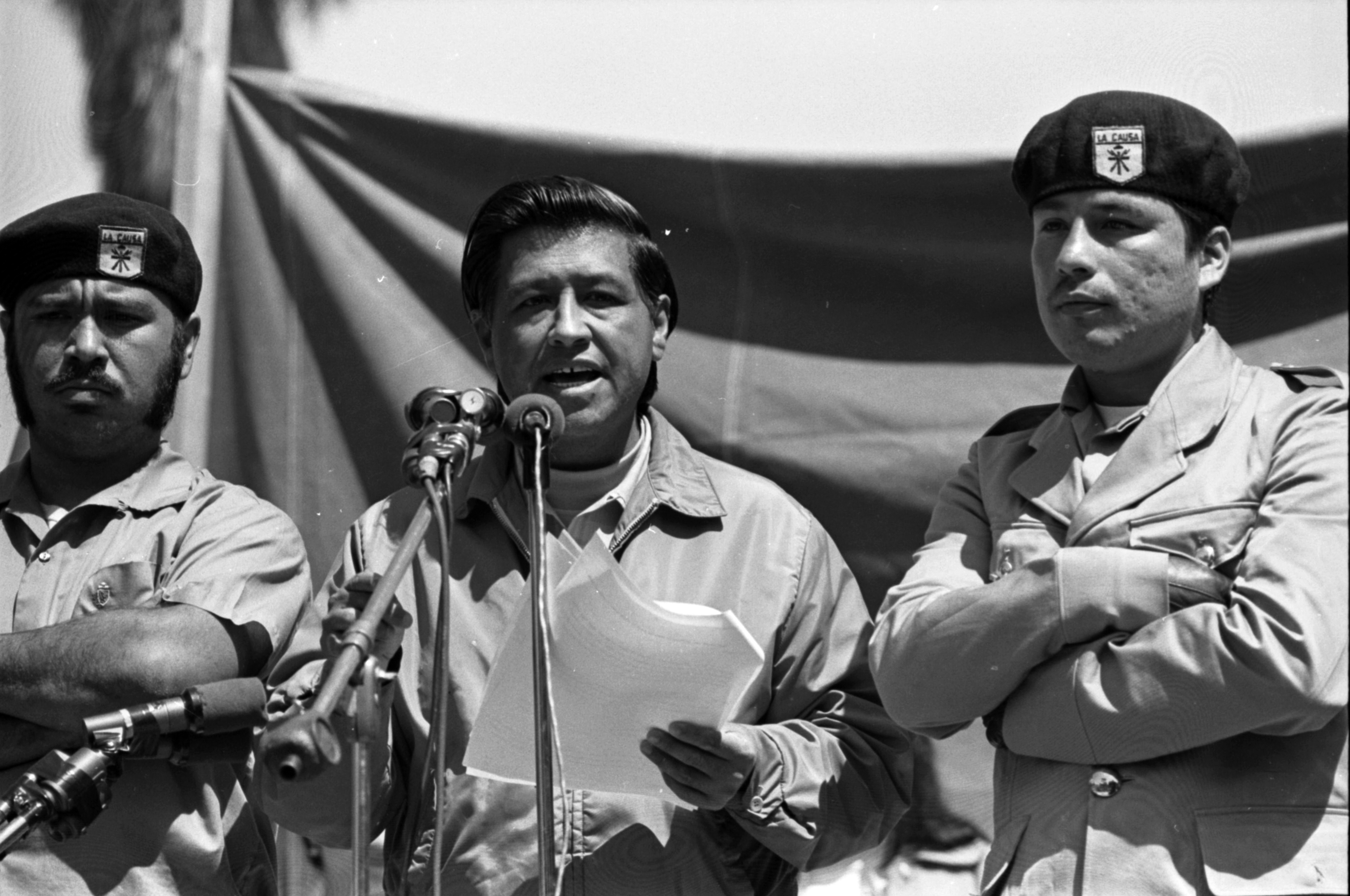
Civil rights activist Cesar Chavez, flanked by Brown Berets, at a 1971 rally during the Chicano movement

During the 20th century, two great disasters happened: the 1906 San Francisco earthquake and 1928 St. Francis Dam flood remain the deadliest in U.S. history.

Although air pollution has been reduced, health problems associated with pollution continue. Brown haze known as "smog" has been substantially abated after federal and state restrictions on automobile exhaust. An energy crisis in 2001 led to rolling blackouts, soaring power rates, and the importation of electricity from neighboring states. Southern California Edison and Pacific Gas and Electric Company came under heavy criticism.

Housing prices in urban areas continued to increase; a modest home which in the 1960s cost $25,000 would cost half a million dollars or more in urban areas by 2005. More people commuted longer hours to afford a home in more rural areas while earning larger salaries in the urban areas. Speculators bought houses, expecting to make a huge profit in months, then rolling it over by buying more properties. Mortgage companies were compliant, as people assumed prices would keep rising. The bubble burst in 2007–2008 as prices began to crash. Hundreds of billions in property values vanished and foreclosures soared, as financial institutions and investors were badly hurt.

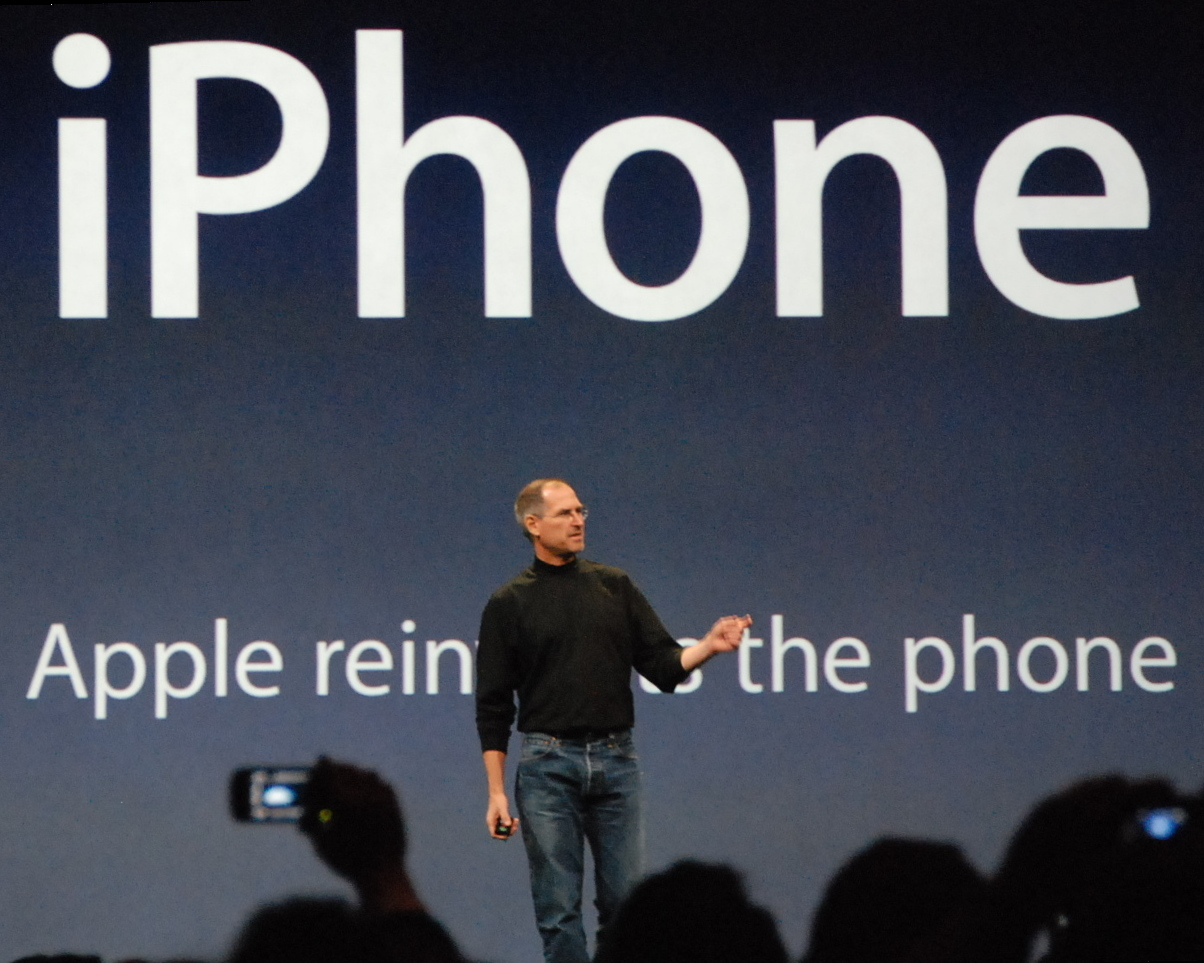
The 2007 launch of the iPhone by Apple founder Steve Jobs in Silicon Valley, the largest tech hub in the world

In the 21st century, droughts and frequent wildfires attributed to climate change have occurred. From 2011 to 2017, a persistent drought was the worst in its recorded history. The 2018 wildfire season was the state's deadliest and most destructive.

One of the first confirmed COVID-19 cases in the U.S. occurred in California on January 26, 2020. A state of emergency was declared in the state on March 4, 2020, and remained in effect until Governor Gavin Newsom ended it in February 2023. A mandatory statewide stay-at-home order was issued on March 19, 2020, and lifted in January 2021.

Cultural and language revitalization efforts among Indigenous Californians have progressed among tribes as of 2022. Some land returns to Indigenous stewardship have occurred. In 2022, the largest dam removal and river restoration project in U.S. history was announced for the Klamath River, as a win for California tribes.

== Geography ==
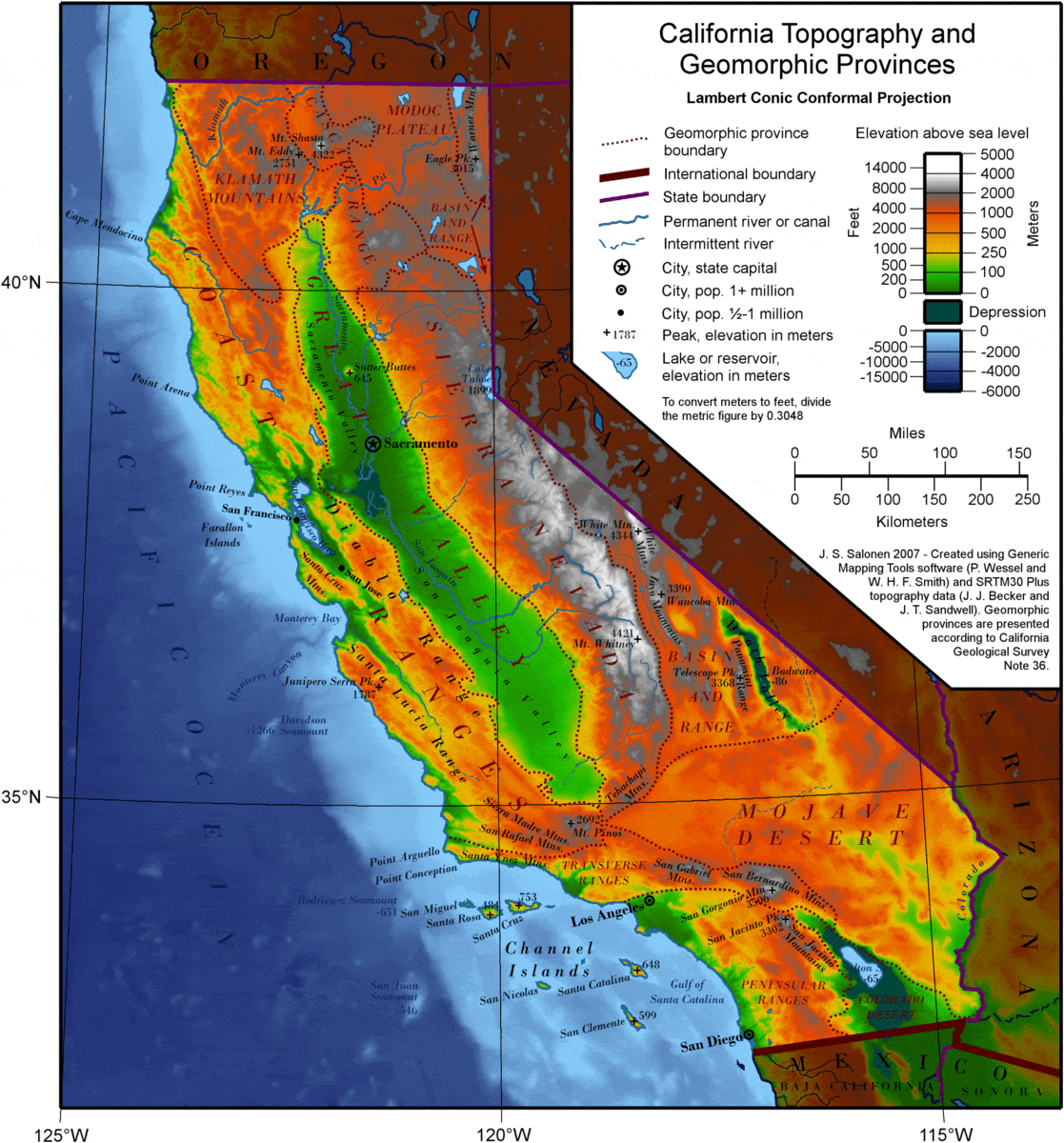
A topographic map of California

Covering an area of 163,696 sq mi (423,970 km^{2}), California is the third-largest state in the U.S. in area, after Alaska and Texas. California is one of the most geographically diverse states in the union and is often geographically bisected into two regions, Southern California, comprising the ten southernmost counties, and Northern California, comprising the 48 northernmost counties. It is bordered by Oregon to the north, Nevada to the east and northeast, Arizona to the southeast, the Pacific Ocean to the west and shares an international border with the Mexican state of Baja California to the south (with which it makes up part of The Californias region of North America, alongside Baja California Sur).

In the middle of the state lies the California Central Valley, bounded by the Sierra Nevada in the east, the coastal mountain ranges in the west, the Cascade Range to the north and by the Tehachapi Mountains in the south. The Central Valley is California's productive agricultural heartland.

Divided in two by the Sacramento-San Joaquin River Delta, the northern portion, the Sacramento Valley serves as the watershed of the Sacramento River, while the southern portion, the San Joaquin Valley is the watershed for the San Joaquin River. Both valleys derive their names from the rivers that flow through them. With dredging, the Sacramento and the San Joaquin Rivers have remained deep enough for several inland cities to be seaports.

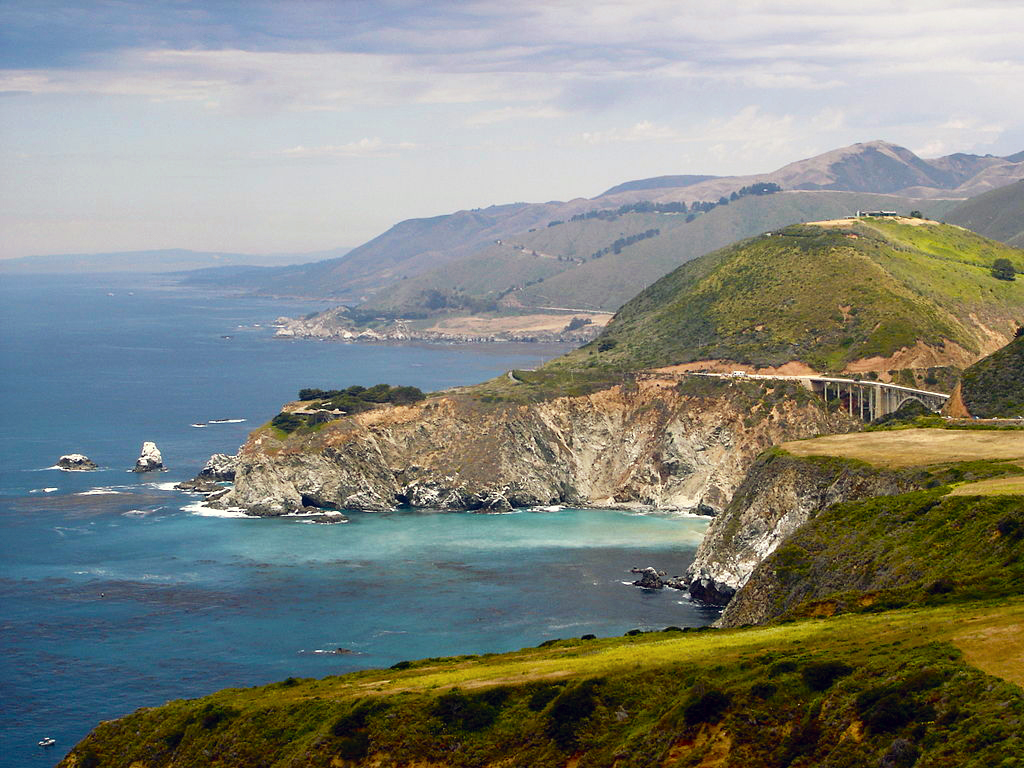
Big Sur, on the Central Coast

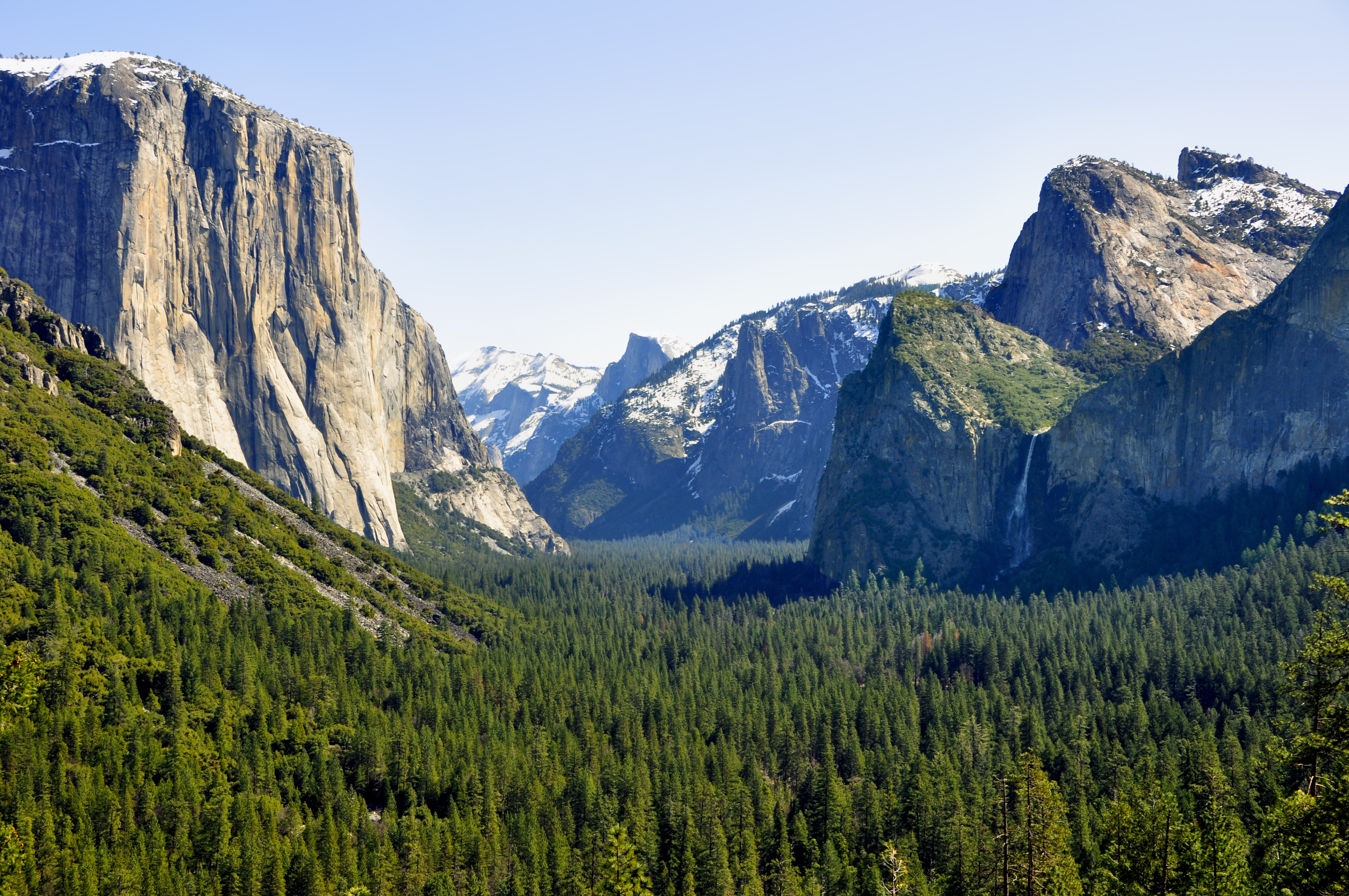
Yosemite, in the Sierra Nevada

The Sacramento-San Joaquin River Delta is a critical water supply hub for the state. Water is diverted from the delta and through an extensive network of pumps and canals that traverse nearly the length of the state, to the Central Valley and the State Water Projects and other needs. Water from the Delta provides drinking water for nearly 23 million people, almost two-thirds of the state's population as well as water for farmers on the west side of the San Joaquin Valley.

Suisun Bay lies at the confluence of the Sacramento and San Joaquin Rivers. The water is drained by the Carquinez Strait, which flows into San Pablo Bay, a northern extension of San Francisco Bay, which then connects to the Pacific Ocean via the Golden Gate strait.

The Channel Islands are located off the Southern coast, while the Farallon Islands lie west of San Francisco.

The Sierra Nevada (Spanish for "snowy range") includes the highest peak in the contiguous 48 states, Mount Whitney, at 14,505 feet (4,421 m). The range embraces Yosemite Valley, famous for its glacially carved domes, and Sequoia National Park, home to the giant sequoia trees, the largest living organisms on Earth, and the deep freshwater lake, Lake Tahoe, the largest lake in the state by volume.

To the east of the Sierra Nevada are Owens Valley and Mono Lake, an essential migratory bird habitat. In the western part of the state is Clear Lake, the largest freshwater lake by area entirely in California. Although Lake Tahoe is larger, it is divided by the California/Nevada border. The Sierra Nevada falls to Arctic temperatures in winter and has several dozen small glaciers, including Palisade Glacier, the southernmost glacier in the U.S.

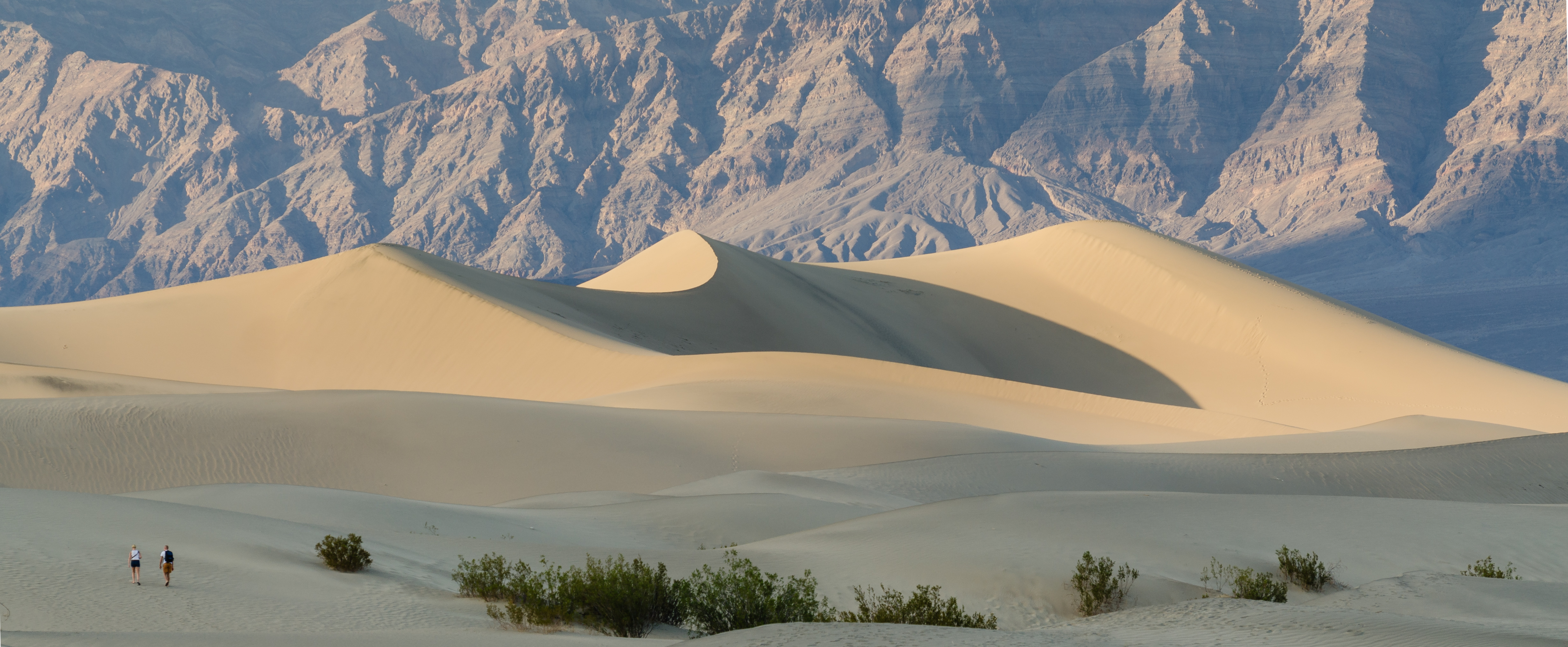
Death Valley, in the Mojave Desert

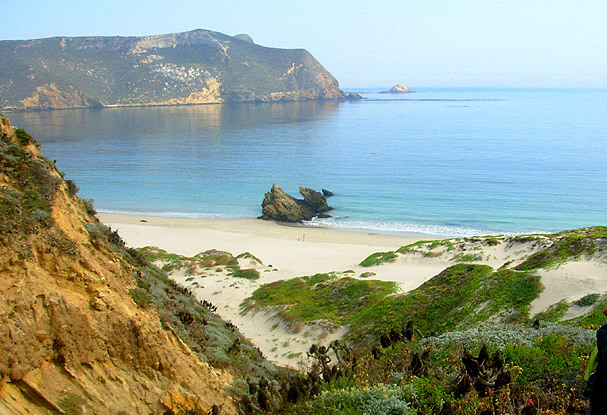
San Miguel, in the Channel Islands

The Tulare Lake was the largest freshwater lake west of the Mississippi River. A remnant of Pleistocene-era Lake Corcoran, Tulare Lake dried up by the early 20th century after its tributary rivers were diverted for agricultural irrigation and municipal water uses.

About 45% of the state's total surface area is covered by forests, and California's diversity of pine species is unmatched by any other state. California contains more forestland than any other state except Alaska. Many of the trees in the California White Mountains are the oldest in the world; an individual bristlecone pine is over 5,000 years old.

In the south is a large inland salt lake, the Salton Sea. The south-central desert is called the Mojave; to the northeast of the Mojave lies Death Valley, which contains the lowest and hottest place in North America, the Badwater Basin at −279 feet (−85 m). The horizontal distance from the bottom of Death Valley to the top of Mount Whitney is less than 90 miles (140 km). Indeed, almost all of southeastern California is arid, hot desert, with routine extreme high temperatures during the summer. The southeastern border of California with Arizona is entirely formed by the Colorado River, from which the southern part of the state gets about half of its water.

A majority of California's cities are located in either the San Francisco Bay Area or the Sacramento metropolitan area in Northern California; or the Los Angeles area, the Inland Empire, or the San Diego metropolitan area in Southern California. The Los Angeles Area, the Bay Area, and the San Diego metropolitan area are among several major metropolitan areas along the California coast.

As part of the Ring of Fire, California is subject to tsunamis, floods, droughts, Santa Ana winds, wildfires, and landslides on steep terrain; California also has several volcanoes. It has many earthquakes due to several faults running through the state, the largest being the San Andreas Fault. About 37,000 earthquakes are recorded each year; most are too small to be felt. Among Americans at risk of serious harm from a major earthquake, two-thirds of that population are residents of California.

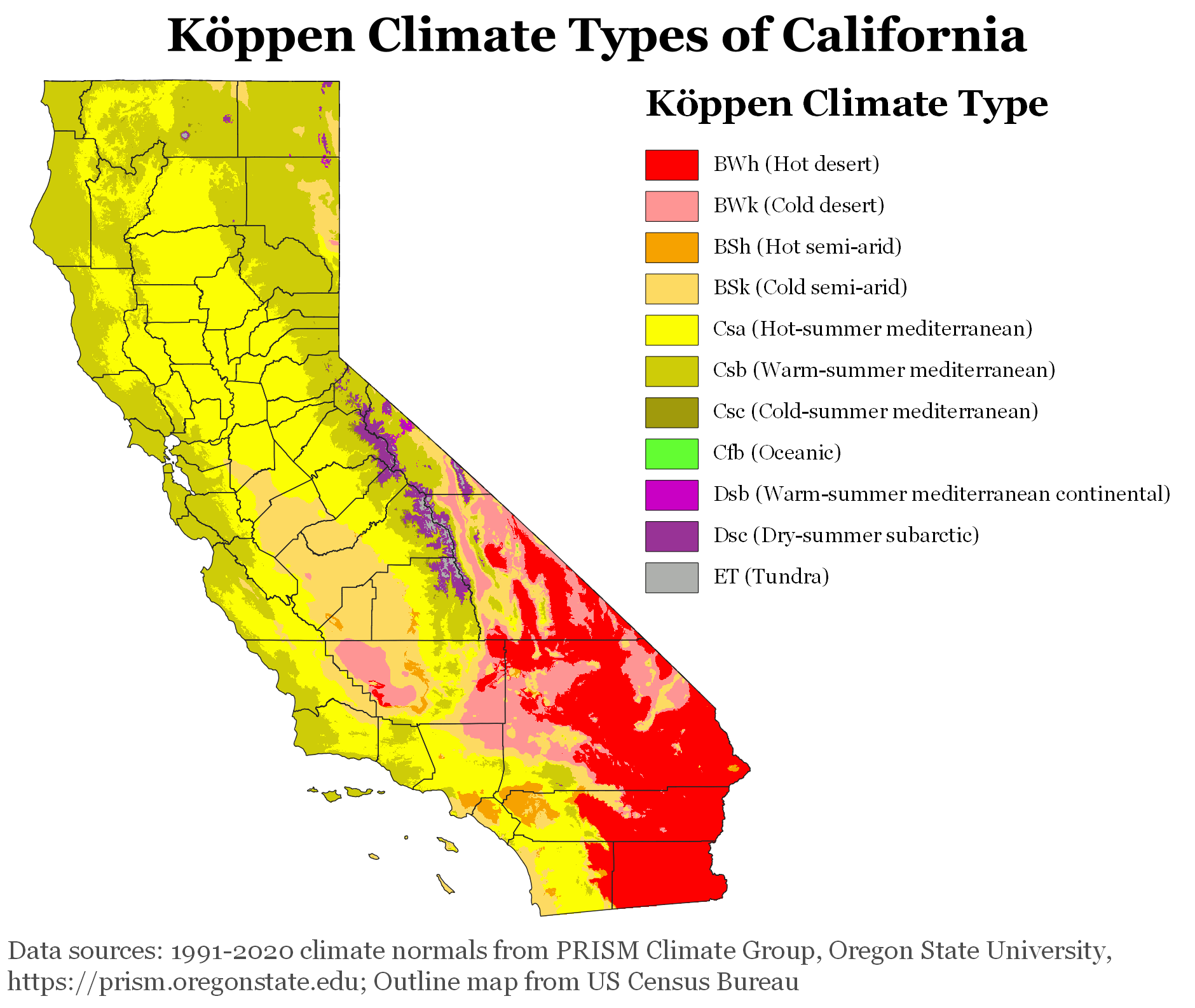
A map of California's climate types

=== Climate ===
Most of the state has a Mediterranean climate. The cool California Current offshore often creates summer fog near the coast. Farther inland, there are colder winters and hotter summers. The maritime moderation results in the shoreline summertime temperatures of Los Angeles and San Francisco being the coolest of all major metropolitan areas of the U.S. and uniquely cool compared to areas on the same latitude in the interior and on the east coast of the North American continent. Even the San Diego shoreline bordering Mexico is cooler in summer than most areas in the contiguous U.S. Just a few miles inland, summer temperature extremes are significantly higher, with downtown Los Angeles being several degrees warmer than at the coast. The same microclimate phenomenon is seen in the climate of the Bay Area, where areas sheltered from the ocean experience significantly hotter summers and colder winters in contrast with nearby areas closer to the ocean.

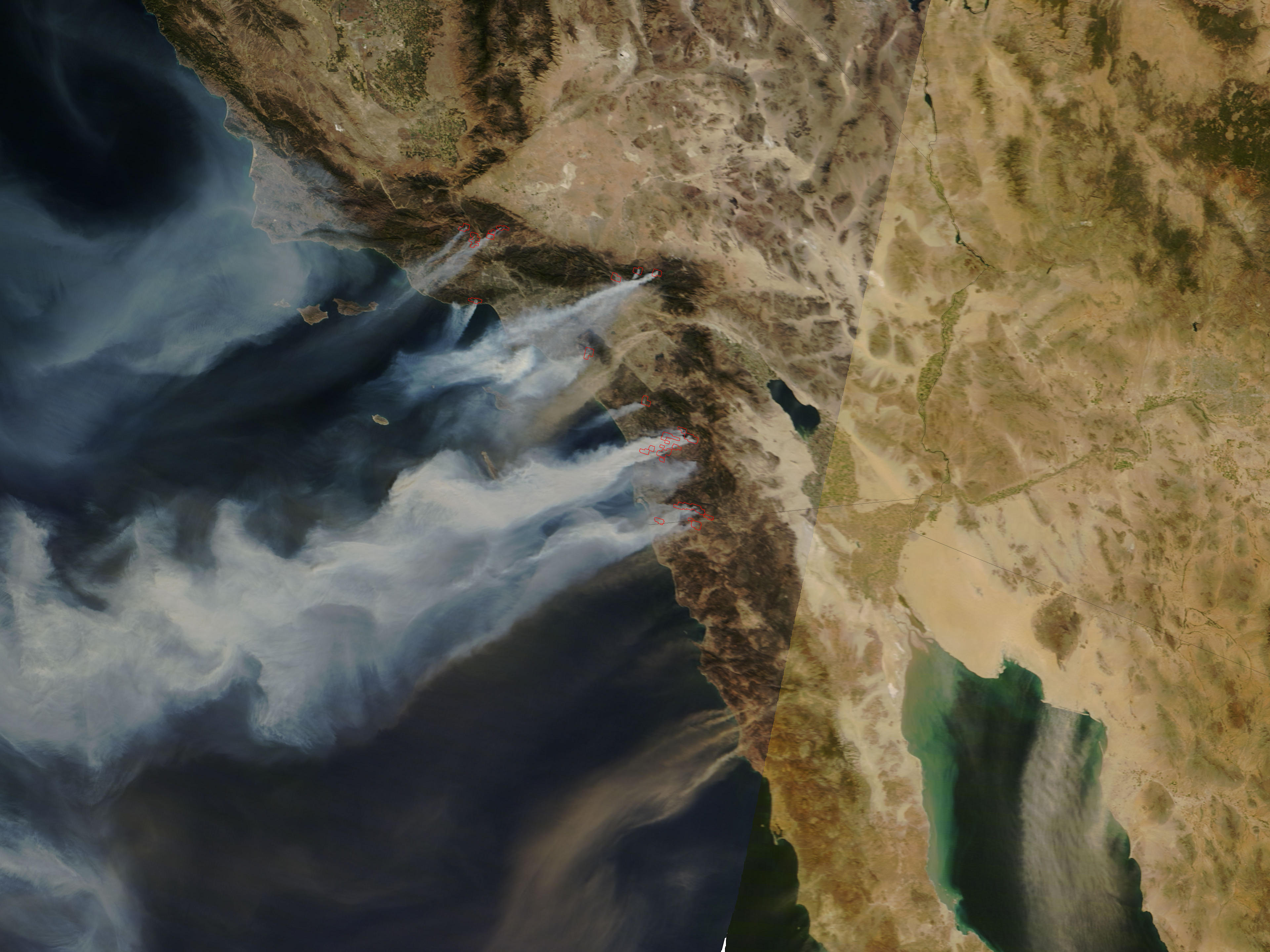
California wildfires affect the state yearly. The Santa Ana winds often expand fires and spread smoke over hundreds of miles.

Northern parts of the state have more rain than the south. California's mountain ranges also influence the climate: some of the rainiest parts of the state are west-facing mountain slopes. Coastal northwestern California has a temperate climate, and the Central Valley has a Mediterranean climate but with greater temperature extremes than the coast. The high mountains, including the Sierra Nevada, have an alpine climate with snow in winter and mild to moderate heat in summer.

California's mountains produce rain shadows on the eastern side, creating extensive deserts. The higher elevation deserts of eastern California have hot summers and cold winters, while the low deserts east of the Southern California mountains have hot summers and nearly frostless mild winters. Death Valley, a desert with large expanses below sea level, is considered the hottest location in the world; the highest temperature in the world, 134 °F (56.7 °C), was recorded there on July 10, 1913. The lowest temperature in California was −45 °F (−43 °C) on January 20, 1937, in Boca.

The table below lists average temperatures for January and August in a selection of places throughout the state, some highly populated and some not. This includes the relatively cool summers of the Humboldt Bay region around Eureka, the extreme heat of Death Valley, and the mountain climate of Mammoth in the Sierra Nevada.

Average temperatures and precipitation for selected communities in California
Location	August (°F)	August (°C)	January (°F)	January (°C)	Annual precipitation (mm/in)
Los Angeles	83/64	29/18	66/48	20/8	377/15
LAX/LA Beaches	75/64	23/18	65/49	18/9	326/13
San Diego	76/67	24/19	65/49	18/9	262/10
San Jose	82/58	27/14	58/42	14/5	401/16
San Francisco	67/54	20/12	56/46	14/8	538/21
Fresno	97/66	34/19	55/38	12/3	292/11
Sacramento	91/58	33/14	54/39	12/3	469/18
Oakland	73/58	23/14	58/44	14/7	588/23
Bakersfield	96/69	36/21	56/39	13/3	165/7
Riverside	94/60	35/18	67/39	19/4	260/10
Eureka	62/53	16/11	54/41	12/5	960/38
Death Valley	115/86	46/30	67/40	19/4	60/2
Mammoth Lakes	77/45	25/7	40/15	4/ −9	583/23

The wide range of climates leads to a high demand for water. Over time, droughts have been increasing due to climate change and overextraction, becoming less seasonal and more year-round, further straining California's electricity supply and water security and having an impact on California business, industry, and agriculture.

In 2022, a new state program was created in collaboration with Indigenous peoples of California to revive the practice of controlled burns as a way of clearing excessive forest debris and making landscapes more resilient to wildfires. Native American use of fire in ecosystem management was outlawed in 1911, yet has now been recognized.

=== Ecology ===
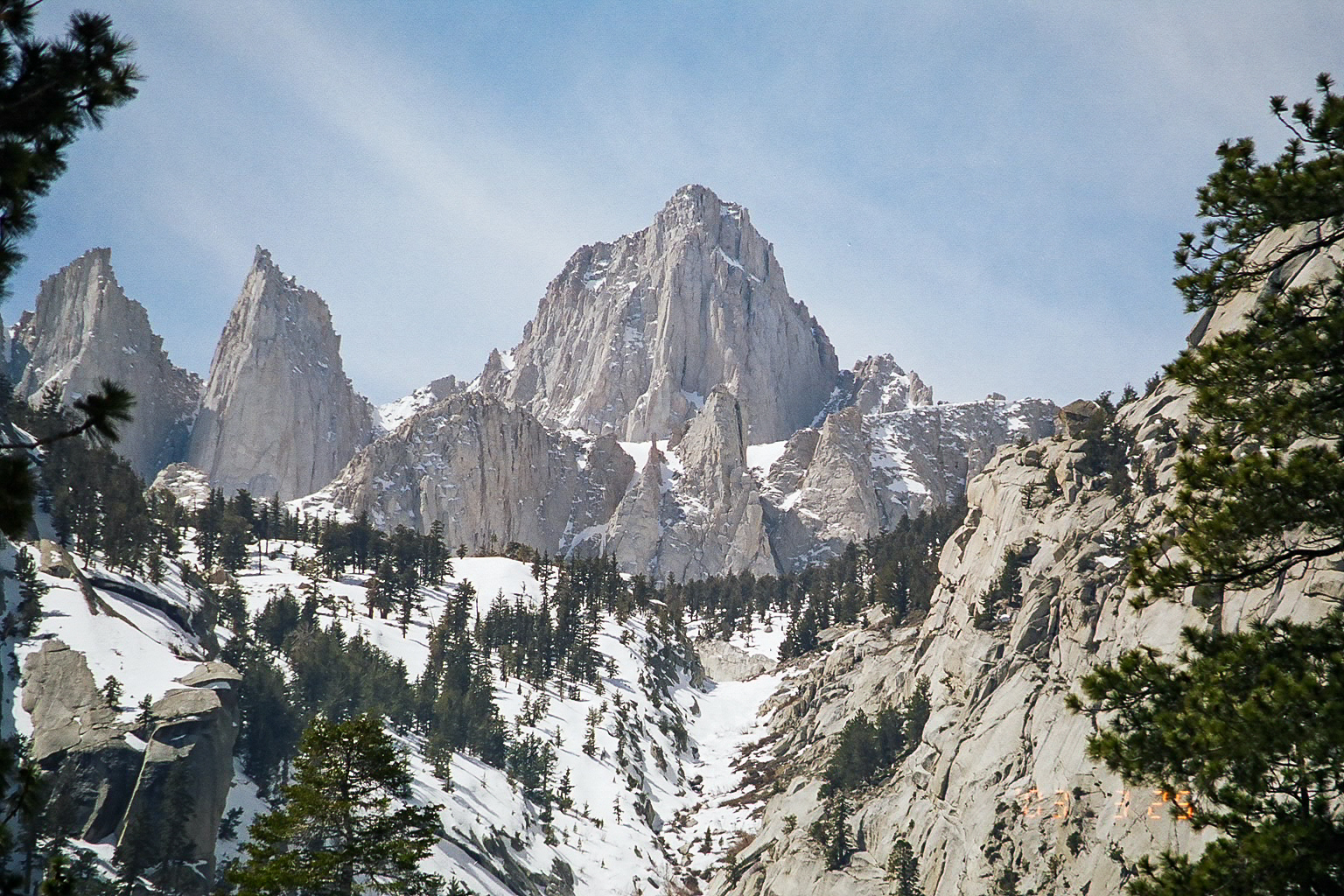
Mount Whitney, in the Sierra Nevada, is the highest mountain in the contiguous U.S.

California is one of the ecologically richest and most diverse parts of the world, and includes some of the most endangered ecological communities. California is part of the Nearctic realm and spans a number of terrestrial ecoregions.

California's large number of endemic species includes relict species, which have died out elsewhere, such as the Catalina ironwood (Lyonothamnus floribundus). Many other endemics originated through differentiation or adaptive radiation, whereby multiple species develop from a common ancestor to take advantage of diverse ecological conditions such as the California lilac (Ceanothus). Many California endemics have become endangered, as urbanization, logging, overgrazing, and the introduction of exotic species have encroached on their habitat.

=== Flora and fauna ===
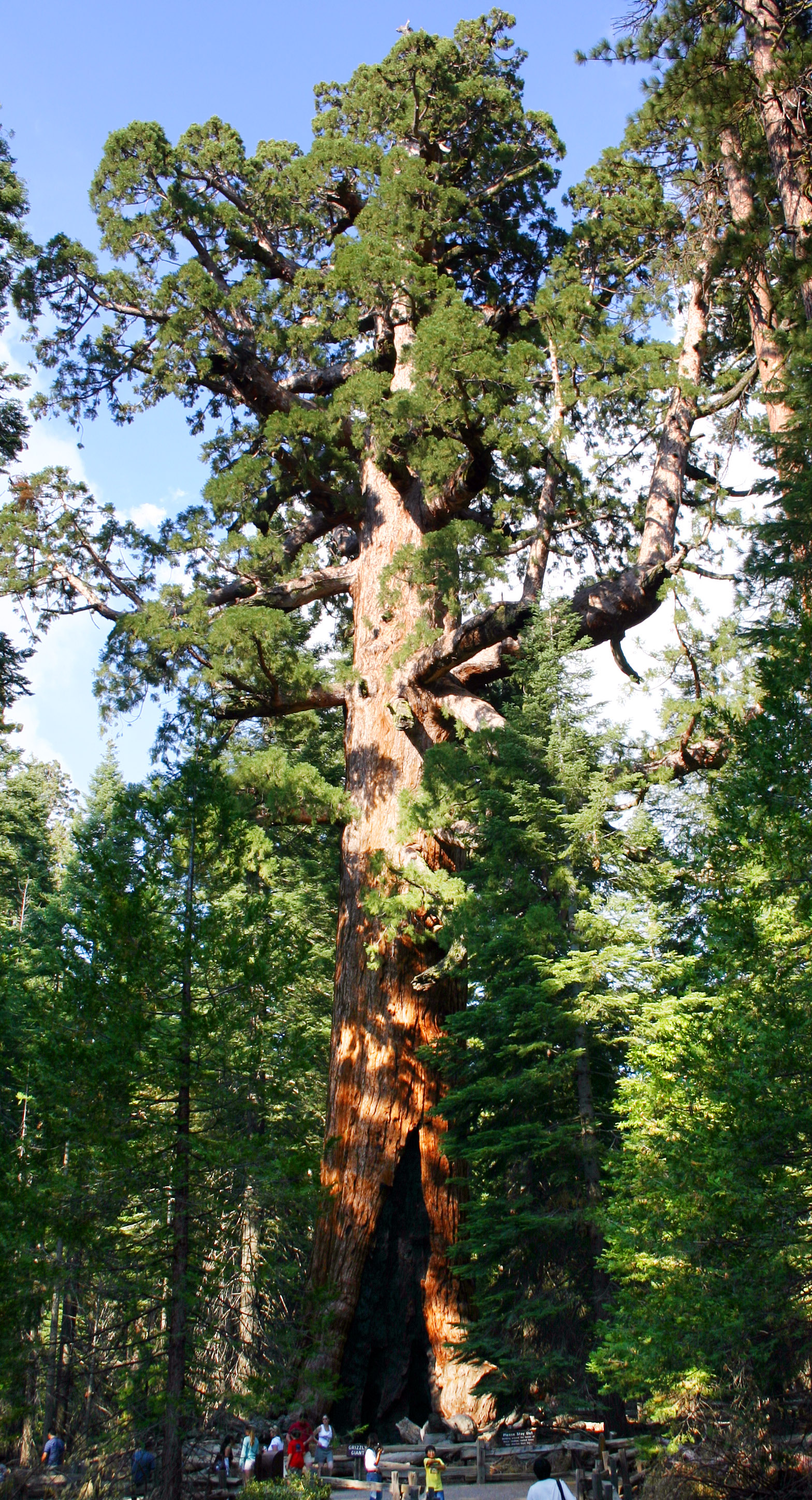
Yosemite's Grizzly Giant, a 209' tall giant sequoia, Earth's largest tree species. Listed as endangered by the IUCN, most sequoia groves have been granted protected status.

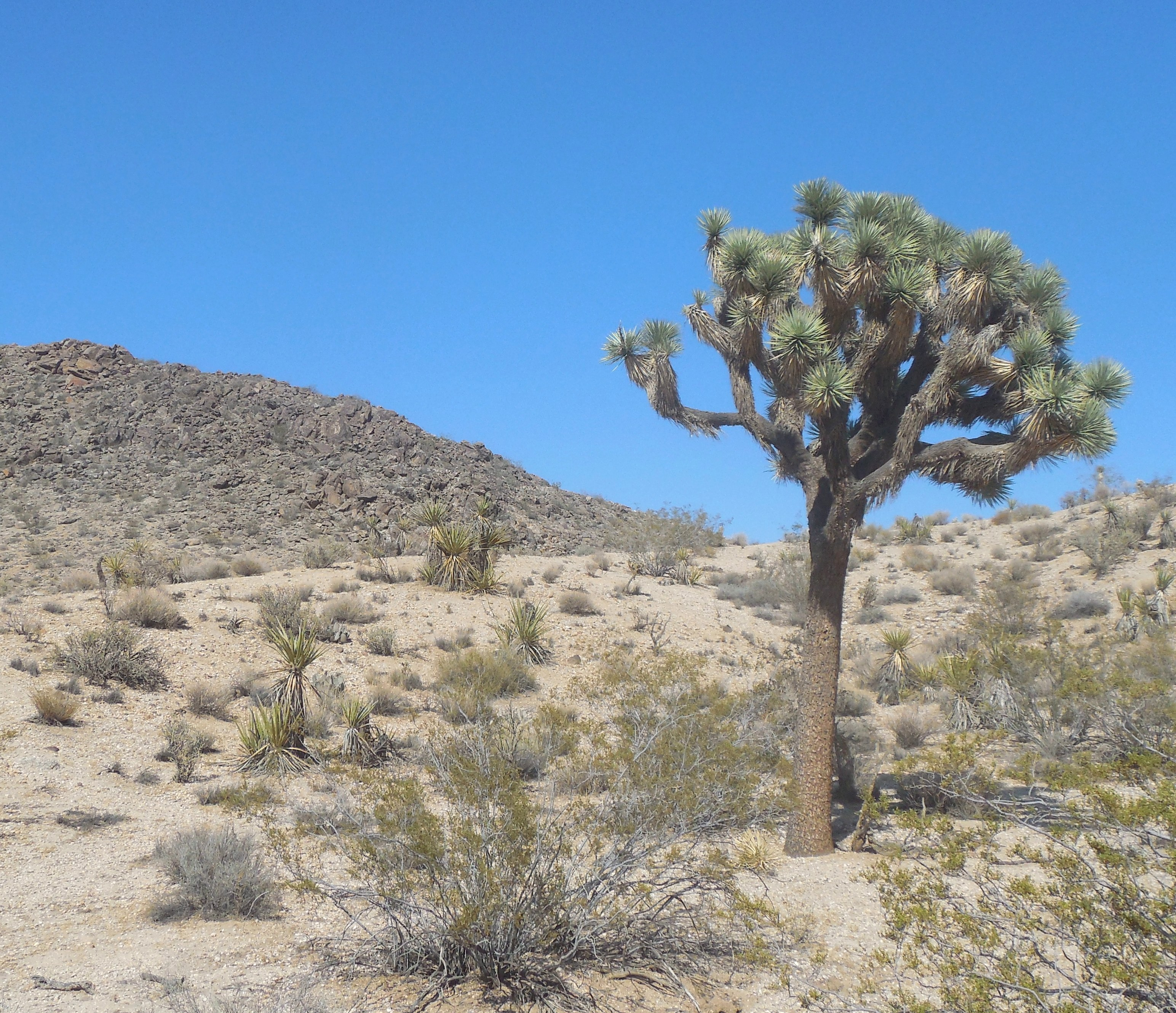
Originally utilized by Indigenous peoples as a source of food and fiber for textiles, the western Joshua Tree (Yucca brevifolia) is a recognizable native plant of Californian deserts and protected under the State's Western Joshua Tree Conservation Act of 2023.

California boasts several superlatives in its collection of flora: the largest trees, the tallest trees, and the oldest trees. California's native grasses are perennial plants, and there are close to hundred succulent species native to the state. After European contact, these were generally replaced by invasive species of European annual grasses; and, in modern times, California's hills turn a characteristic golden-brown in summer.

Because California has the greatest diversity of climate and terrain, the state has six life zones which are the lower Sonoran Desert; upper Sonoran (foothill regions and some coastal lands), transition (coastal areas and moist northeastern counties); and the Canadian, Hudsonian, and Arctic Zones, comprising the state's highest elevations.

Plant life in the dry climate of the lower Sonoran zone contains a diversity of native cactus, mesquite, and paloverde. The Joshua tree is found in the Mojave Desert. Flowering plants include the dwarf desert poppy and a variety of asters. Fremont cottonwood and valley oak thrive in the Central Valley. The upper Sonoran zone includes the chaparral belt, characterized by forests of small shrubs, stunted trees, and herbaceous plants. Nemophila, mint, Phacelia, Viola, and the California poppy (Eschscholzia californica, the state flower) also flourish in this zone, along with the lupine, more species of which occur here than anywhere else in the world.

The transition zone includes most of California's forests with the redwood (Sequoia sempervirens) and the "big tree" or giant sequoia (Sequoiadendron giganteum), among the oldest living things on earth (some are said to have lived at least 4,000 years). Tanbark oak, California laurel, sugar pine, madrona, broad-leaved maple, and Douglas-fir also grow here. Forest floors are covered with swordfern, alumroot, barrenwort, and trillium, and there are thickets of huckleberry, azalea, elder, and wild currant. Characteristic wild flowers include varieties of mariposa, tulip, and tiger and leopard lilies.

A California sea lion in La Jolla

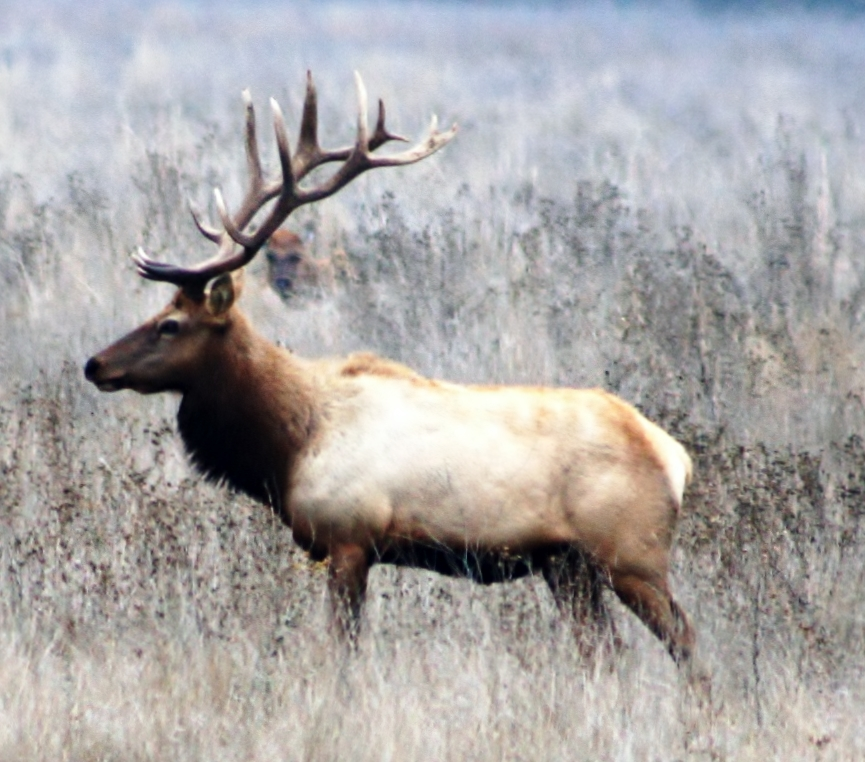
A Tule Elk in the San Joaquin Valley

The high elevations of the Canadian zone allow the Jeffrey pine, red fir, and lodgepole pine to thrive. Brushy areas are abundant with dwarf manzanita and ceanothus; the unique Sierra puffball is also found here. Right below the timberline, in the Hudsonian zone, the whitebark, foxtail, and silver pines grow. At about 10,500 feet (3,200 m), begins the Arctic zone, a treeless region whose flora include a number of wildflowers, including Sierra primrose, yellow columbine, alpine buttercup, and alpine shooting star.

Palm trees are a well-known feature of California, particularly in Southern California and Los Angeles; many species have been imported, though the Washington filifera (commonly known as the California fan palm) is native to the state, mainly growing in the Colorado Desert oases. Other common plants that have been introduced to the state include the eucalyptus, acacia, pepper tree, geranium, and Scotch broom. The species that are federally classified as endangered are the Contra Costa wallflower, Antioch Dunes evening primrose, Solano grass, San Clemente Island larkspur, salt marsh bird's beak, McDonald's rock-cress, and Santa Barbara Island liveforever. As of December 1997, 85 plant species were listed as threatened or endangered.

In the deserts of the lower Sonoran zone, the mammals include the jackrabbit, kangaroo rat, squirrel, and opossum. Common birds include the owl, Greater roadrunner, cactus wren, and various species of hawk. The area's reptilian life include the sidewinder viper, desert tortoise, and horned toad. The upper Sonoran zone boasts mammals such as the antelope, brown-footed woodrat, and ring-tailed cat. Birds unique to this zone are the California thrasher, bushtit, and California condor.

In the transition zone, there are Colombian black-tailed deer, black bears, gray foxes, cougars, bobcats, and Roosevelt elk. Reptiles such as the garter snakes and rattlesnakes inhabit the zone. In addition, amphibians such as the water puppy and redwood salamander are common too. Birds such as the Belted kingfisher, chickadee, towhee, and hummingbird thrive here as well.

The Canadian zone mammals include the Long-tailed weasel, snowshoe hare, and several species of chipmunks. Conspicuous birds include the blue-fronted jay, mountain chickadee, hermit thrush, American dipper, and Townsend's solitaire. As one ascends into the Hudsonian zone, birds become scarcer. While the gray-crowned rosy finch is the only bird native to the high Arctic region, other bird species such as Anna's hummingbird and Clark's nutcracker. Principal mammals found in this region include the American pika, white-tailed jackrabbit, and the bighorn sheep. As of April 2003, the bighorn sheep was listed as endangered by the U.S. Fish and Wildlife Service. The fauna found throughout several zones are the mule deer, coyote, mountain lion, northern flicker, and several species of hawk and sparrow.

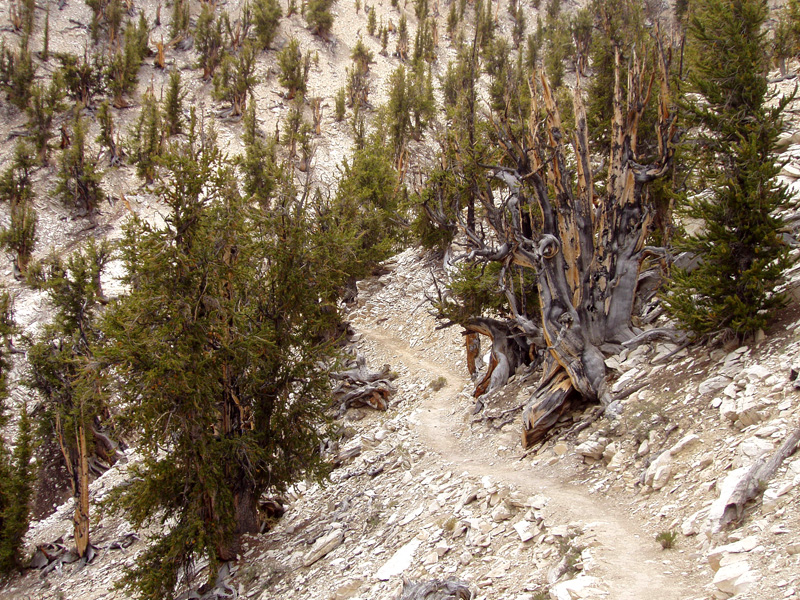
Methuselah is the oldest tree in the world, found in the Ancient Bristlecone Pine Forest of Inyo National Forest.

Aquatic life in California thrives, from the state's mountain lakes and streams to the rocky Pacific coastline. Numerous trout species are found, among them rainbow, golden, and cutthroat. Migratory species of salmon are common as well. Deep-sea life forms include sea bass, yellowfin tuna, Pacific barracuda, and several types of whale. Native to the cliffs of northern California are seals, California sea lion, and many types of shorebirds, including migratory species.

As of April 2003, 118 California animals were on the federal endangered list; 181 plants were listed as endangered or threatened. Endangered animals include the San Joaquin kitfox, Point Arena mountain beaver, Pacific pocket mouse, salt marsh harvest mouse, Morro Bay kangaroo rat (and five other species of kangaroo rat), Amargosa vole, California least tern, California condor, loggerhead shrike, San Clemente sage sparrow, San Francisco garter snake, five species of salamander, three species of chub, and two species of pupfish. Eleven butterflies are also endangered and two that are threatened are on the federal list. Among threatened animals are the coastal California gnatcatcher, Paiute cutthroat trout, southern sea otter, and northern spotted owl. California has a total of 290,821 acres (1,176.91 km^{2}) of National Wildlife Refuges. As of September 2010, 123 California animals were listed as either endangered or threatened on the federal list. Also, as of the same year, 178 species of California plants were listed either as endangered or threatened on this federal list. Multiple mammal species have been extirpated from the state in recent times including brown bear, jaguar, and American bison.

=== Rivers ===
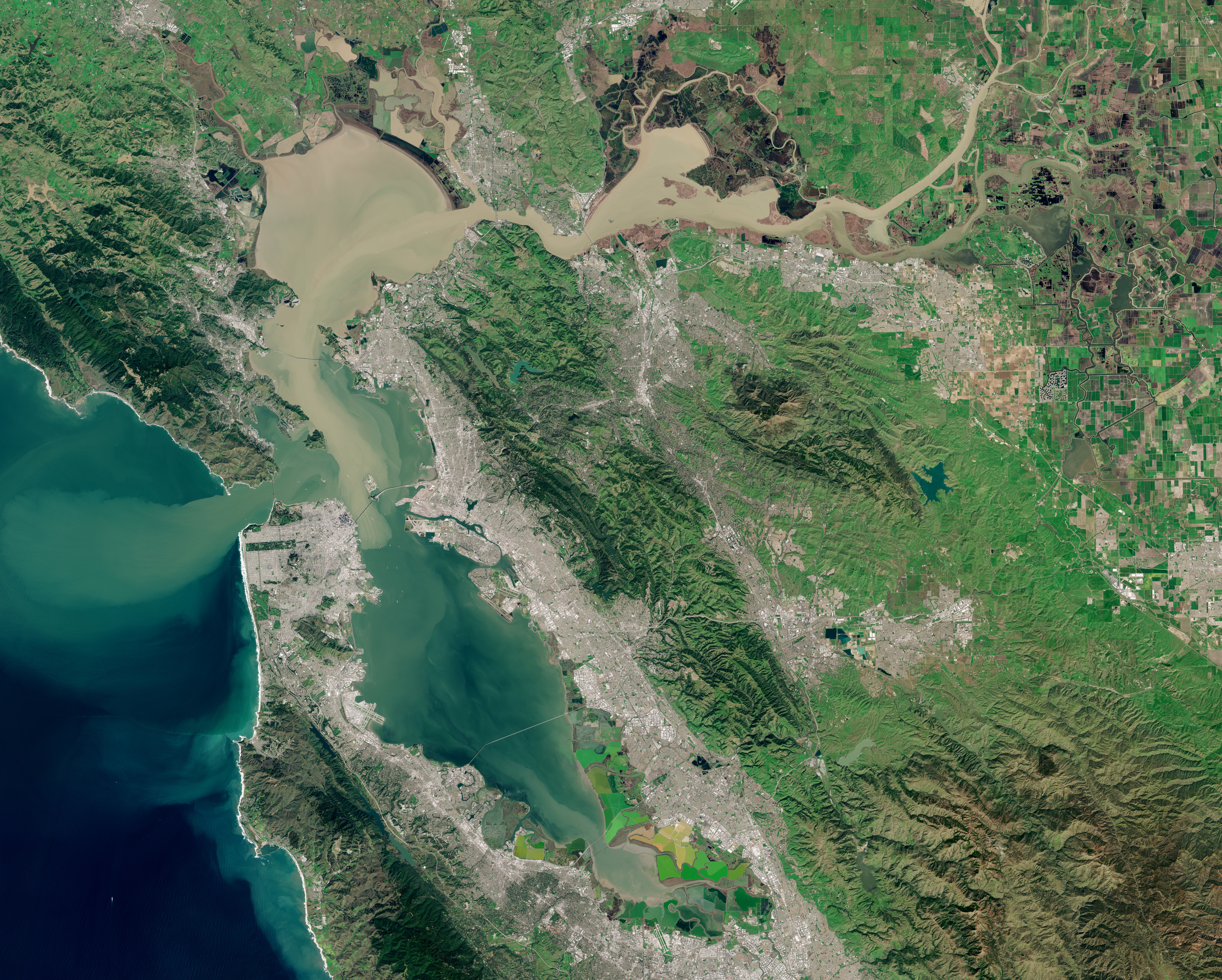
San Francisco Bay (center left) and the California Delta (top right)

The most prominent river system within California is formed by the Sacramento River and San Joaquin River, which are fed mostly by snowmelt from the west slope of the Sierra Nevada, and respectively drain the north and south halves of the Central Valley. The two rivers join in the Sacramento–San Joaquin River Delta, flowing into the Pacific Ocean through San Francisco Bay. Many major tributaries feed into the Sacramento–San Joaquin system, including the Pit River, Feather River and Tuolumne River.

The Klamath and Trinity Rivers drain a large area in far northwestern California. The Eel River and Salinas River each drain portions of the California coast, north and south of San Francisco Bay, respectively. The Mojave River is the primary watercourse in the Mojave Desert, and the Santa Ana River drains much of the Transverse Ranges as it bisects Southern California. The Colorado River forms the state's southeast border with Arizona.

Most of California's major rivers are dammed as part of two massive water projects: the Central Valley Project, providing water for agriculture in the Central Valley, and the California State Water Project diverting water from Northern to Southern California. The state's coasts, rivers, and other bodies of water are regulated by the California Coastal Commission.

=== Regions ===
A map of California's regions

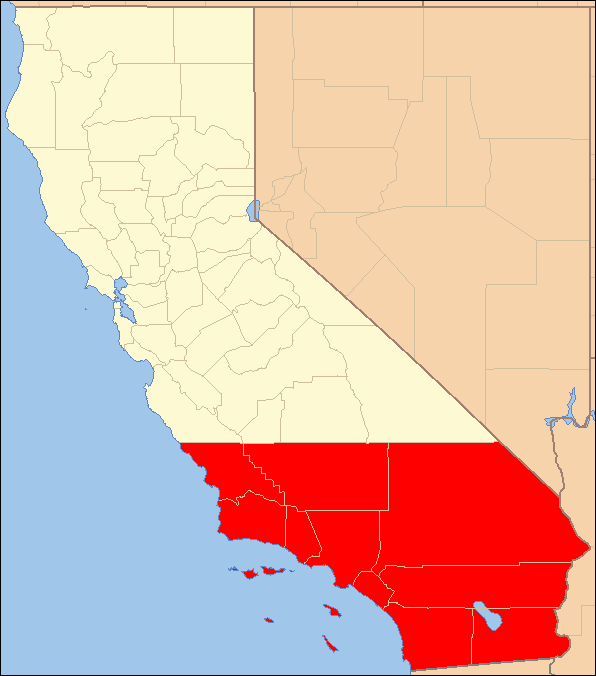
A map showing the division between Northern California (top white) and Southern California (bottom red)

California is traditionally separated into Northern California and Southern California, divided by a straight border which runs across the state, separating the northern 48 counties from the southern 10 counties. Despite the persistence of the northern-southern divide, California is more precisely divided into many regions, multiple of which stretch across the northern-southern divide.

Major divisions

- Northern California
- Southern California

Regions

- Shasta Cascade
  - Klamath Basin
  - Modoc Plateau
- North Coast
  - Lost Coast
- Bay Area
  - North Bay
  - San Francisco Peninsula
  - South Bay (Santa Clara Valley)
  - East Bay
- Central Valley
  - Sacramento Valley
    - Greater Sacramento
  - San Joaquin Valley
    - Metropolitan Fresno
  - California Delta
- Sierra Nevada
  - Gold Country
  - Eastern Sierra
- Central Coast
  - Monterey Bay Area
  - Big Sur
  - Gaviota Coast
- Southern California
  - Greater Los Angeles
    - Antelope Valley
    - Los Angeles Basin
    - San Fernando Valley
    - San Gabriel Valley
    - Santa Clarita Valley
  - Channel Islands
  - Orange Coast
  - Inland Empire
  - San Diego–Tijuana
- California Deserts
  - Mojave Desert
  - Great Basin Desert
  - Colorado Desert (Sonoran Desert)
    - Calexico–Mexicali

=== Cities and towns ===
California has 483 incorporated cities and towns, of which 461 are cities and 22 are towns. Under California law, the terms "city" and "town" are explicitly interchangeable. The name of an incorporated municipality in California can either be "City of (Name)" or "Town of (Name)".

Sacramento became California's first incorporated city on February 27, 1850. San Jose, San Diego, and Benicia tied for California's second incorporated city, each receiving incorporation on March 27, 1850. Mountain House became the state's most recent and 483rd incorporated municipality on July 1, 2024. The majority of these cities and towns are within one of five metropolitan areas: the Los Angeles Metropolitan Area, the San Francisco Bay Area, the Riverside-San Bernardino Area, the San Diego metropolitan area, or the Sacramento metropolitan area.

Largest cities or towns in California Source:
Rank	Name	County	Pop.	Rank	Name	County	Pop.
1	Los Angeles	Los Angeles	3,898,747	11	Stockton	San Joaquin	320,804
2	San Diego	San Diego	1,386,932	12	Riverside	Riverside	314,998
3	San Jose	Santa Clara	1,013,240	13	Santa Ana	Orange	310,227
4	San Francisco	San Francisco	873,965	14	Irvine	Orange	307,670
5	Fresno	Fresno	542,107	15	Chula Vista	San Diego	275,487
6	Sacramento	Sacramento	524,943	16	Fremont	Alameda	230,504
7	Long Beach	Los Angeles	466,742	17	Santa Clarita	Los Angeles	228,673
8	Oakland	Alameda	440,646	18	San Bernardino	San Bernardino	222,101
9	Bakersfield	Kern	403,455	19	Modesto	Stanislaus	218,464
10	Anaheim	Orange	346,824	20	Moreno Valley	Riverside	208,634

Largest metropolitan statistical areas in California
CA rank	U.S. rank	Metropolitan statistical area	2020 census	2010 census	Change	Counties
1	2	Los Angeles-Long Beach-Anaheim, CA MSA	13,200,998	12,828,837	+2.90%	Los Angeles, Orange
2	12	San Francisco-Oakland-Hayward, CA MSA	4,749,008	4,335,391	+9.54%	Alameda, Contra Costa, Marin, San Francisco, San Mateo
3	13	Riverside-San Bernardino-Ontario, CA MSA	4,599,839	4,224,851	+8.88%	Riverside, San Bernardino
4	17	San Diego-Carlsbad, CA MSA	3,298,634	3,095,313	+6.57%	San Diego
5	26	Sacramento–Roseville–Arden-Arcade, CA MSA	2,397,382	2,149,127	+11.55%	El Dorado, Placer, Sacramento, Yolo
6	35	San Jose-Sunnyvale-Santa Clara, CA MSA	2,000,468	1,836,911	+8.90%	San Benito, Santa Clara
7	56	Fresno, CA MSA	1,008,654	930,450	+8.40%	Fresno
8	62	Bakersfield, CA MSA	909,235	839,631	+8.29%	Kern
9	70	Oxnard-Thousand Oaks-Ventura, CA MSA	843,843	823,318	+2.49%	Ventura
10	75	Stockton-Lodi, CA MSA	779,233	685,306	+13.71%	San Joaquin

Largest combined statistical areas in California
CA rank	U.S. rank	Combined statistical area	2020 census	2010 census	Change	Counties
1	2	Los Angeles-Long Beach, CA Combined Statistical Area	18,644,680	17,877,006	+4.29%	Los Angeles, Orange, Riverside, San Bernardino, Ventura
2	4	San Jose-San Francisco-Oakland, CA Combined Statistical Area	9,714,023	8,923,942	+8.85%	Alameda, Contra Costa, Marin, Merced, Napa, San Benito, San Francisco, San Joaquin, San Mateo, Santa Clara, Santa Cruz, Solano, Sonoma, Stanislaus
3	23	Sacramento-Roseville, CA Combined Statistical Area	2,680,831	2,414,783	+11.02%	El Dorado, Nevada, Placer, Sacramento, Sutter, Yolo, Yuba
4	45	Fresno-Madera, CA Combined Statistical Area	1,317,395	1,234,297	+6.73%	Fresno, Kings, Madera
5	125	Redding-Red Bluff, CA Combined Statistical Area	247,984	240,686	+3.03%	Shasta, Tehama

== Demographics ==
=== Population ===
Historical population
Census	Pop.	Note	%±
1850	92,597		—
1860	379,994		310.4%
1870	560,247		47.4%
1880	864,694		54.3%
1890	1,213,398		40.3%
1900	1,485,053		22.4%
1910	2,377,549		60.1%
1920	3,426,861		44.1%
1930	5,677,251		65.7%
1940	6,907,387		21.7%
1950	10,586,223		53.3%
1960	15,717,204		48.5%
1970	19,953,134		27.0%
1980	23,667,902		18.6%
1990	29,760,021		25.7%
2000	33,871,648		13.8%
2010	37,253,956		10.0%
2020	39,538,223		6.1%
2025 (est.)	39,355,309		−0.5%
Sources: 1790–1990, 2000, 2010, 2020, 2024; Chart does not include Indigenous population figures. Studies indicate that the Native American population in California in 1850 was close to 150,000 before declining to 15,000 by 1900.

Presently, close to one out of every nine U.S. residents live in California. According to the 2020 U.S. census, the population of California was 39.54 million on April 1, 2020, a 6.13% increase since 2010. During that decade, the state's population grew more slowly than the rest of the nation, resulting in the loss of one seat on the U.S. House of Representatives, the first loss in its entire history. The estimated state population in 2023 was 38.94 million. For well over a century (1900–2020), California experienced steady population growth. Even while the rate of growth began to slow by the 1990s, some growth progressed into the first two decades of the 21st century; California added an average of around 400,000 people per year to its population during the period 1940–2020. Then in 2020, the state began to experience population declines continuing every year, attributable mostly to moves out of state but also due to declining birth rates, COVID-19 pandemic deaths, and less internal migration from other states to California. According to the U.S. Census Bureau, between 2021 and 2022, 818,000 California residents moved out of state with emigrants listing high cost of living, California housing shortage rise of remote work, high taxes, and a difficult business environment as the motivation. The net loss of population in California between July 2020 and July 2023 was 433,000. As of the 2020 Census, California had a population density of 250/mi^{2} and a population-weighted density of 7954/mi^{2}. (Note: Mean of density in 1mi radii circles around each person)

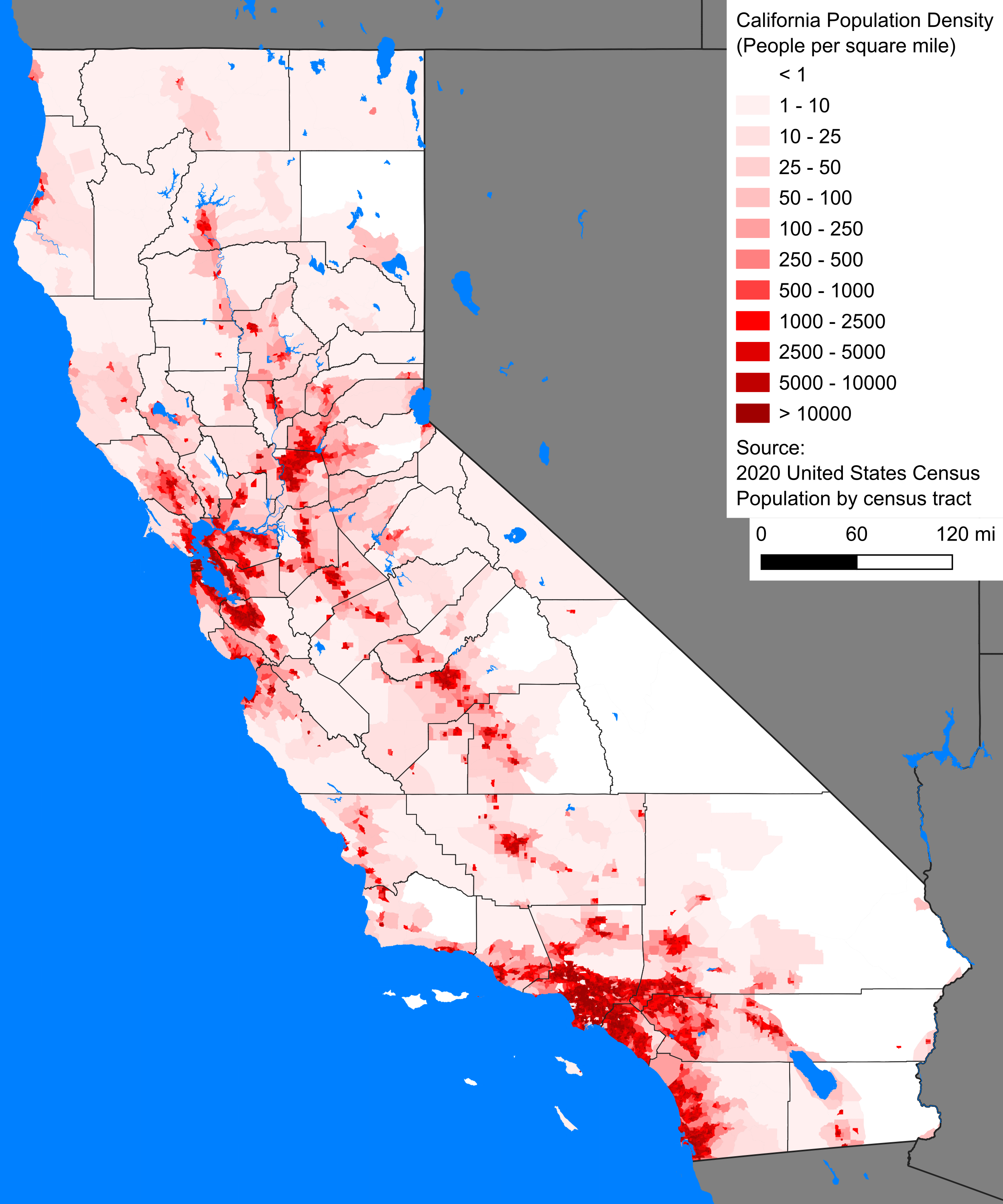
California's population density, 2020

The Greater Los Angeles Area is the second-largest metropolitan area in the U.S., while Los Angeles is the second-largest city in the U.S. Los Angeles County has held the title of most populous U.S. county for decades and it alone is more populous than 42 U.S. states. San Francisco is the most densely populated city in California and one of the most densely populated cities in the U.S.. Four of the top 20 most populous cities in the U.S. are in California: Los Angeles (2nd), San Diego (8th), San Jose (13th), and San Francisco (17th). The center of population of California is located four miles west-southwest of the city of Shafter, Kern County. (Note: The coordinates of the center of population are at 35.491035°N 119.347852°W.)

As of 2020, California ranked fourth among states by life expectancy, with a life expectancy of 79.0 years.

Starting in 2010, for the first time since the California Gold Rush, California-born residents made up the majority of the state's population. Along with the rest of the U.S., California's immigration pattern has also shifted over the course of the late 2000s to early 2010s. Immigration from Latin American countries has dropped significantly with most immigrants now coming from Asia. In total for 2011, there were 277,304 immigrants; 57% came from Asian countries versus 22% from Latin American countries. Net immigration from Mexico, previously the most common country of origin for new immigrants, has dropped to zero / less than zero since more Mexican nationals are departing for their home country than immigrating.

The state's population of undocumented immigrants has been shrinking in recent years, due to increased enforcement and decreased job opportunities for lower-skilled workers. The number of migrants arrested attempting to cross the Mexican border in the Southwest decreased from a high of 1.1 million in 2005 to 367,000 in 2011. Despite these recent trends, undocumented immigrants constituted an estimated 7.3% of the state's population, the third highest percentage of any state in the country, (Note: Behind Nevada and Arizona) totaling nearly 2.6 million. In particular, illegal immigrants tended to be concentrated in Los Angeles, Monterey, San Benito, Imperial, and Napa Counties—the latter four of which have significant agricultural industries that depend on manual labor. More than half of illegal immigrants originate from Mexico. The state of California and some California cities, including Los Angeles, Oakland, and San Francisco, have adopted sanctuary policies.

According to HUD's 2022 Annual Homeless Assessment Report, there were an estimated 171,521 homeless people in California.

=== Race and ethnicity ===
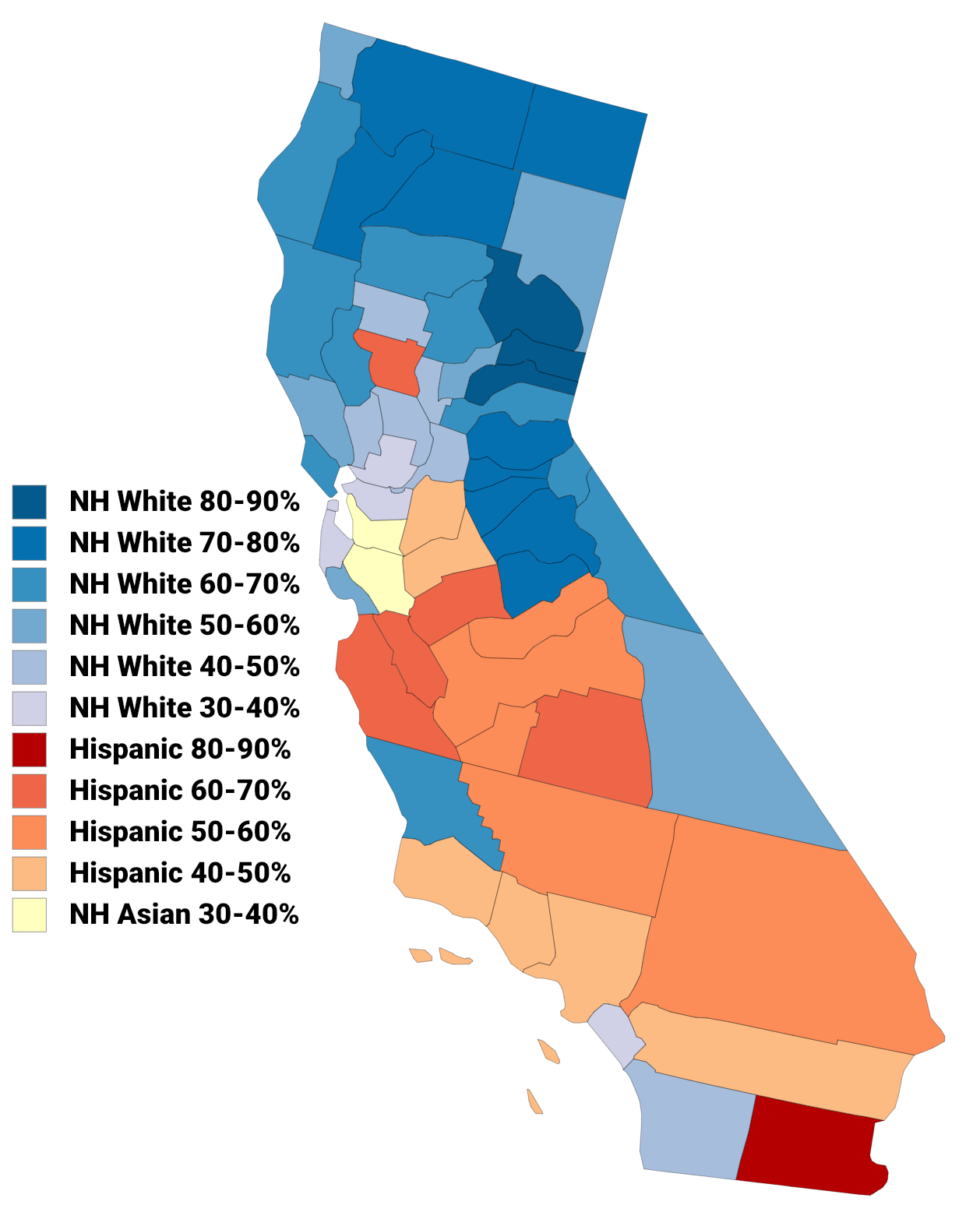
Map of counties in California by racial and ethnic plurality, per the 2020 U.S. census

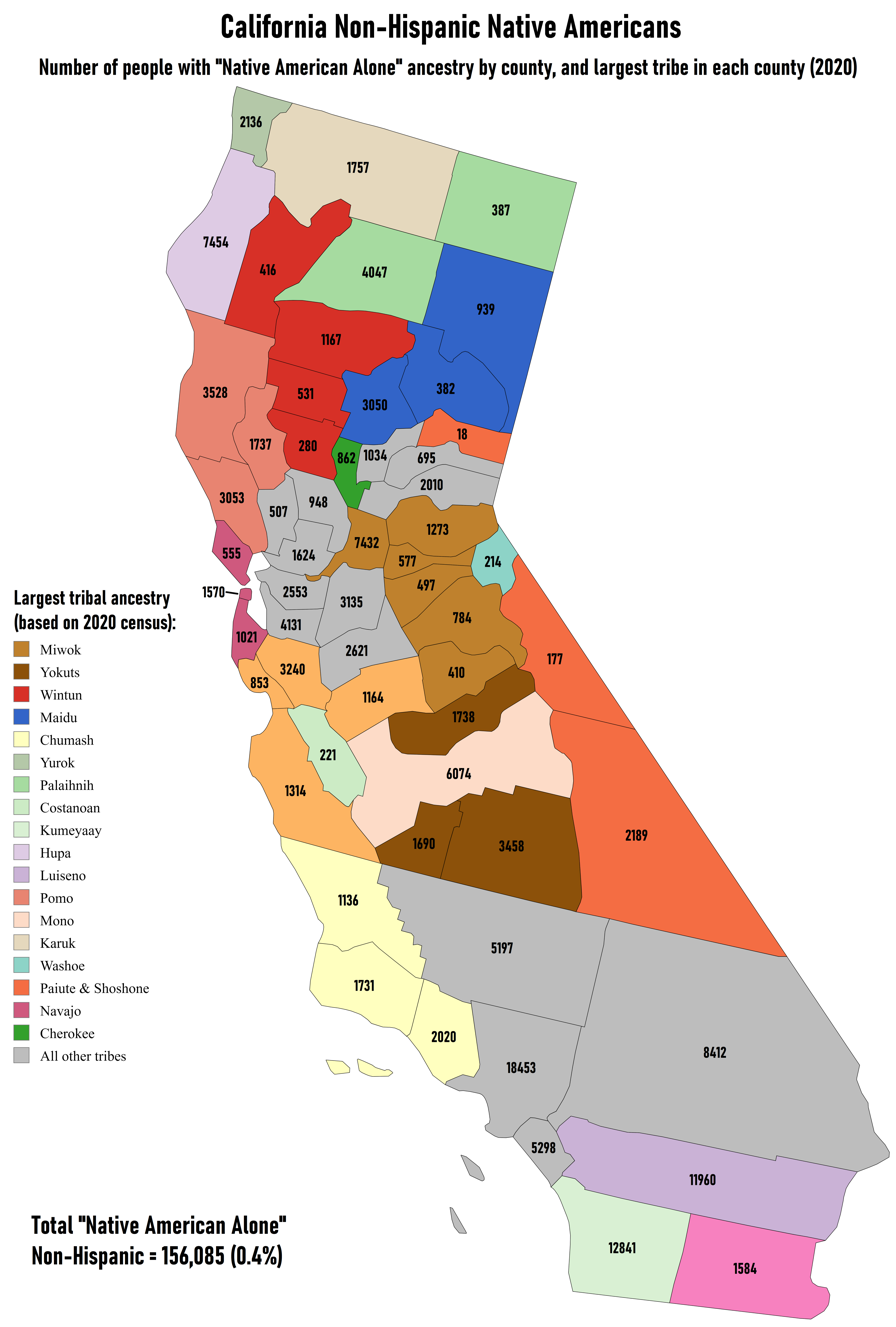

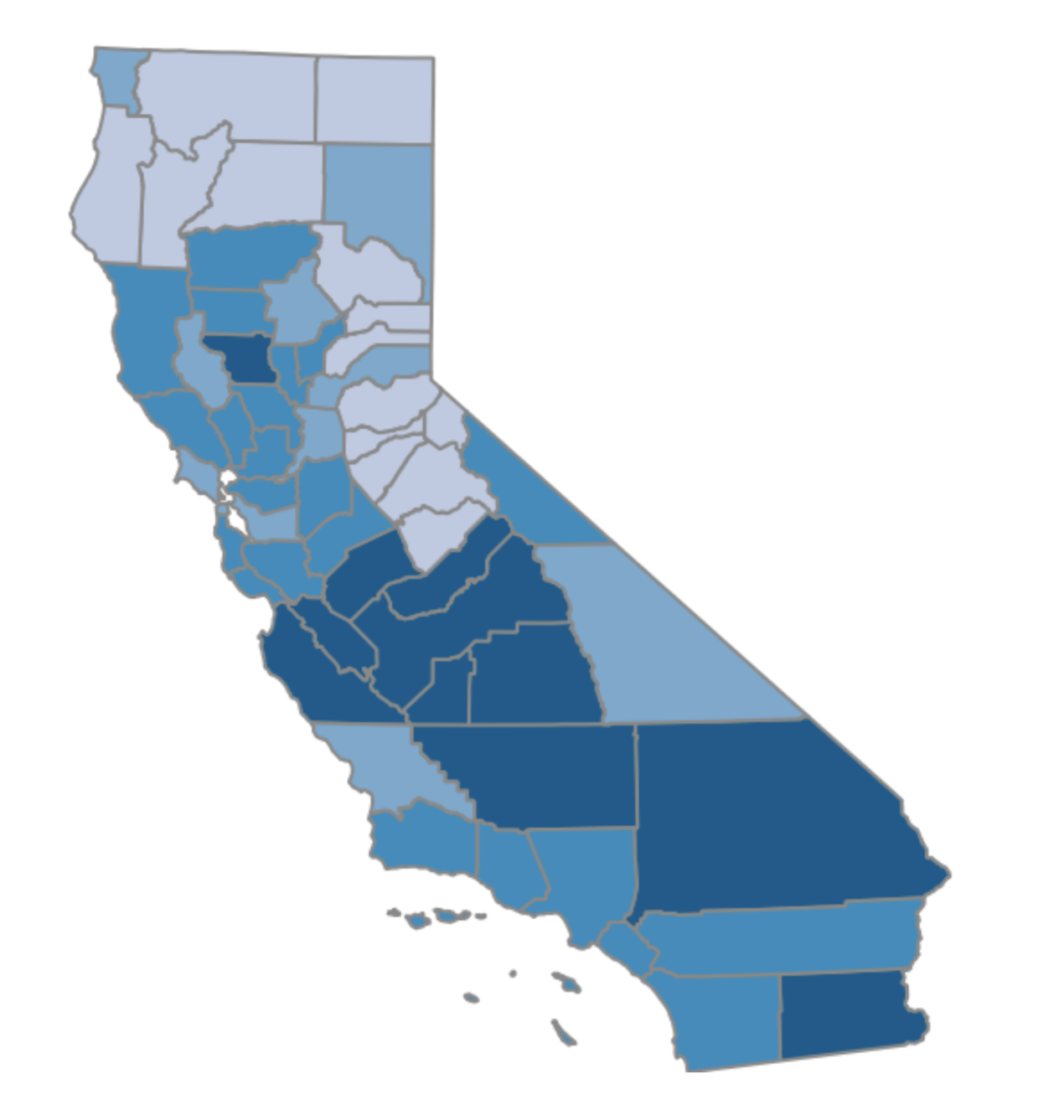
Hispanic and Latino Californians make up the state's largest ethnic group. The map displays California's counties by percentage of Hispanics and Latinos in the 2020 census: 50% or more 25–49% 15–24% 5–15%

Racial and ethnic composition as of the 2020 census
Race and ethnicity	Alone	Total
Hispanic or Latino (Note: Persons of Hispanic or Latino origin are not distinguished between total and partial ancestry.)	—	39.4%
White (non-Hispanic)	34.7%	38.3%
Asian (non-Hispanic)	15.1%	17.0%
African American (non-Hispanic)	5.4%	6.4%
Native American (non-Hispanic)	0.4%	1.3%
Pacific Islander (non-Hispanic)	0.3%	0.7%
Other (non-Hispanic)	0.6%	1.3%

California Racial Breakdown of Population
Racial composition	1950	1960	1970	1980	1990	2000	2010	2020
White	93.7%	92%	89%	76.2%	69%	59.6%	57.6%	41.2%
Black	4.4%	5.6%	7%	7.7%	7.4%	6.7%	6.2%	5.6%
Asian	1.7%	2%	2.8%	5.3%	9.6%	10.9%	13%	15.4%
Native American	0.2%	0.2%	0.5%	0.9%	0.8%	1%	1%	1.6%
Pacific Islander	—	—	—	—	—	0.4%	0.4%	0.4%
'Some other race'	—	0.1%	0.7%	10%	13.2%	16.8%	17%	21.2%
Two or more races	—	—	—	—	—	4.8%	4.9%	14.6%
Hispanic or Latino (Any race)	7.2%	9.1%	13.7%	19.2%	25.8%	32.4%	37.6%	39.4%
Non-Hispanic White	86.5%	82.9%	76.3%	66.6%	57.2%	46.7%	40.2%	34.7%
Non-Hispanic Black	—	—	—	7.5%	7.0%	6.4%	5.8%	5.4%
Non-Hispanic Asian	—	—	—	5.3%	9.1%	10.8%	12.8%	15.1%
Non-Hispanic Native American	—	—	—	0.9%	0.6%	0.5%	0.4%	0.4%
Non-Hispanic Pacific Islander	—	—	—	—	—	0.3%	0.3%	0.3%
Non-Hispanic 'some other race'	—	—	—	0.5%	0.2%	0.2%	0.2%	0.6%
Non-Hispanic two or more races	—	—	—	—	—	2.7%	2.4%	4.1%

According to the U.S. Census Bureau, in 2022 the population self-identified as (alone or in combination): 56.5% White (including Hispanic Whites), 33.7% non-Hispanic white, 18.1% Asian, 7.3% Black or African American, 3.2% Native American and Alaska Native, 0.9% Native Hawaiian or Pacific Islander, and 34.3% some other race. These numbers add up to more than 100% because respondents can select multiple racial identities. 19% of Californians identified as two or more races in 2022, although excluding respondents who selected "some other race", only 5% identified as two or more races.

By ethnicity, in 2018 the population was 60.7% non-Hispanic (of any race) and 39.3% Hispanic or Latino (of any race). Hispanics are the largest single ethnic group in California. Non-Hispanic whites constituted 36.8% of the state's population. Californios are the Hispanic residents native to California, who make up the Spanish-speaking community that has existed in California since 1542, of varying Mexican American/Chicano, Criollo Spaniard, and Mestizo origin. However, they make up only a small part of California's Hispanic population today, estimated at 500,000. California has the largest Mexican, Salvadoran, and Guatemalan populations in the U.S., together making up over 90% of the state's Latino population.

According to 2022 estimates from the American Community Survey, 32.4% of the population had Mexican ancestry, 6.6% had German ancestry, 6.1% had English ancestry, 5.6% had Irish ancestry, 4.9% had Chinese ancestry, 4.3% had Filipino ancestry, 4% had Central American ancestry (Mostly Salvadoran and Guatemalan), 3.4% had Italian ancestry, 2.8% listed themselves as American, and 2.5% had Indian ancestry.

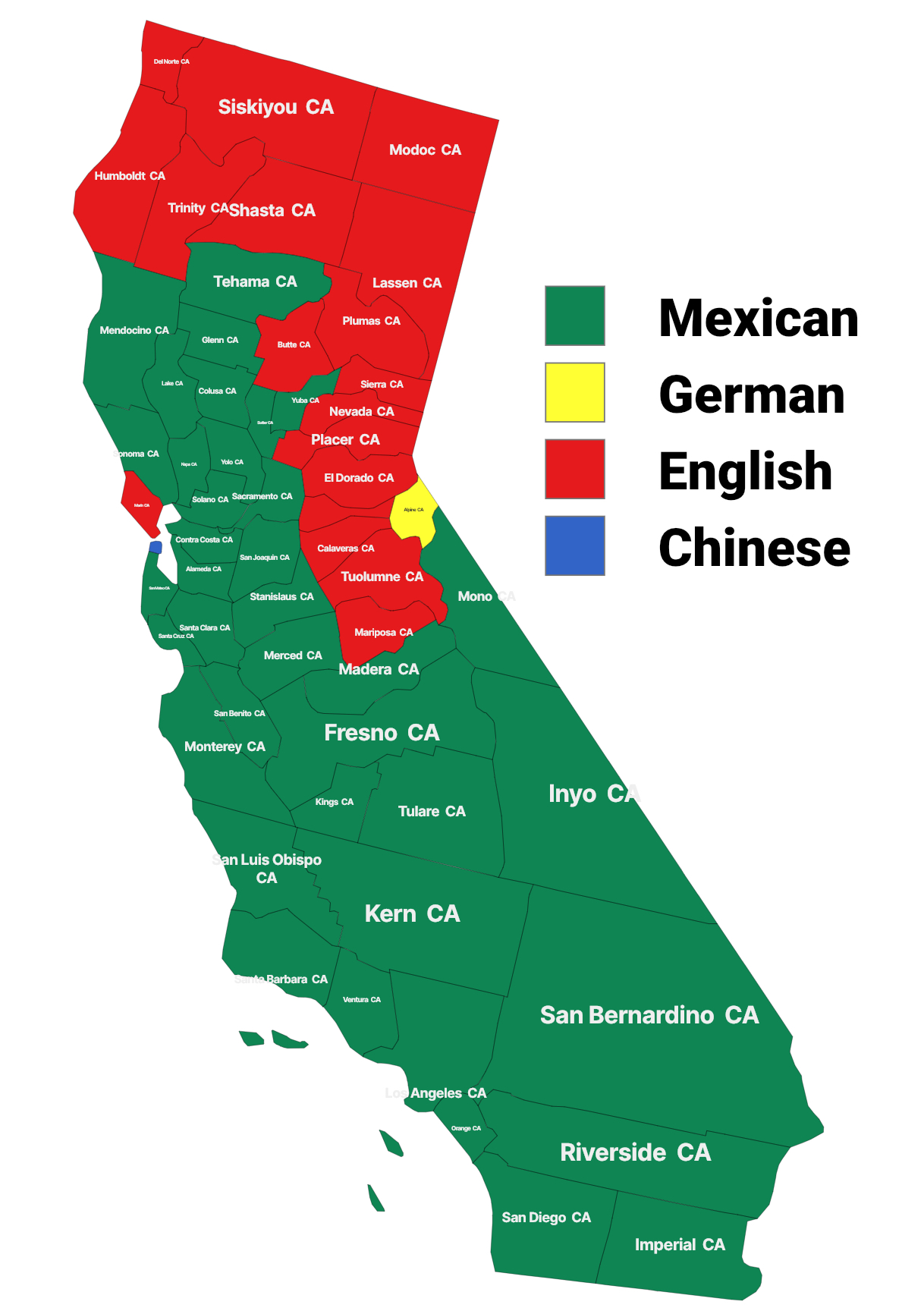
Largest alone or in any combination ethnic origin by county in California, per the 2020 census

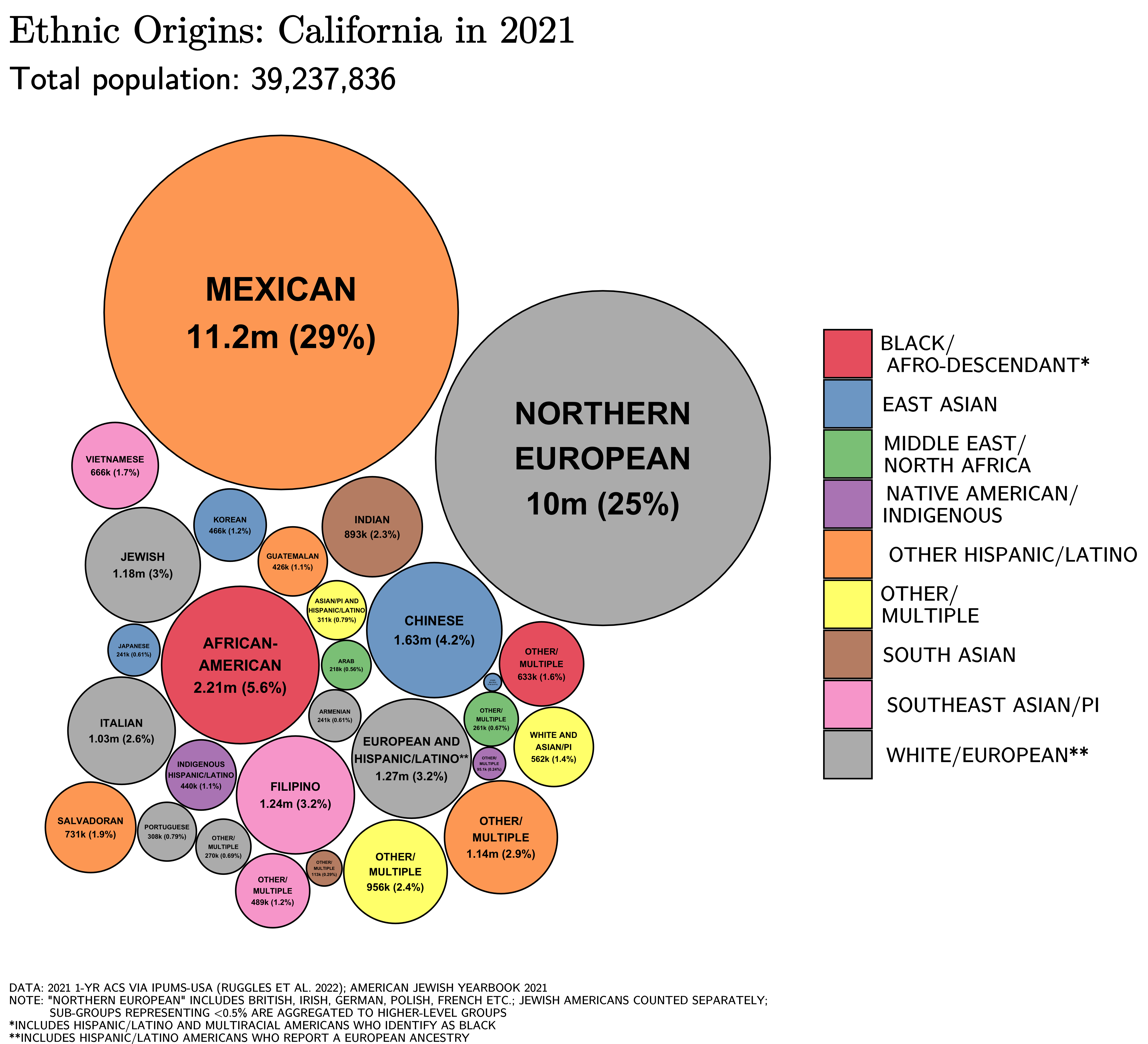
Ethnic origins in California

As of 2011, 75.1% of California's population younger than age 1 were minorities, meaning they had at least one parent who was not non-Hispanic white (white Hispanics are counted as minorities).

In terms of total numbers, California has the largest population of White Americans in the U.S., an estimated 22,200,000 residents including people identifying as white in combination with any other race. The state has the 5th largest population of African Americans in the U.S., an estimated 2,250,000 residents. California's Asian American population is estimated at 7.1 million, constituting a third of the nation's total. California's Native American population of 504,000 is the most of any state, with 103,030 identifying as Non-Hispanic and belonging mostly to the Indigenous peoples of California. Most of the state's Native American population identifies as Hispanic and belongs to Indigenous Mexican or Central American ethnic groups, including 185,200 identifying as Mexican American Indian and 67,904 identifying as Central American Indian.

According to estimates from 2011, California has the largest minority population in the U.S. by numbers, making up 60% of the state population. Over the past 25 years, the population of non-Hispanic whites has declined, while Hispanic and Asian populations have grown. Between 1970 and 2011, non-Hispanic whites declined from 80% of the state's population to 40%, while Hispanics grew from 32% in 2000 to 38% in 2011. It is currently projected that Hispanics will rise to 49% of the population by 2060, primarily due to domestic births rather than immigration. With the decline of immigration from Latin America, Asian Americans now constitute the fastest growing racial/ethnic group in California; this growth is primarily driven by immigration from China, India, and the Philippines, respectively.

The majority of California's immigrants were born in Latin America (49%) or Asia (41%). Most of California's immigrant population were born in Mexico (3.8 million), the Philippines (821,136), China (795,450), India (574,498), and Vietnam (525,455) and more than half (55%) of California's immigrants were naturalized US citizens in 2023 which has increased consistently since 1990, when only 31% of immigrants were naturalized.

=== Languages ===
Languages spoken in California by more than 100,000 persons
Language	Population (as of 2021)	%
English	20,763,638	56.08%
Spanish	10,434,308	28.18%
Chinese	1,244,445	3.36%
Tagalog	757,488	2.05%
Vietnamese	544,046	1.47%
Korean	356,901	0.96%
Arabic	231,612	0.63%
Persian	221,650	0.6%
Armenian	211,614	0.57%
Hindi	208,148	0.56%
Russian	178,176	0.48%
Punjabi	156,763	0.42%
Japanese	135,992	0.37%
French	126,371	0.34%

English serves as California's de jure and de facto official language. According to the 2021 American Community Survey conducted by the U.S. Census Bureau, 56.08% (20,763,638) of California residents age 5 and older spoke only English at home, while 43.92% spoke another language at home. Some 60.35% of California residents who speak a language other than English at home are able to speak English "well" or "very well", with this figure varying significantly across the different linguistic groups. Like most U.S. states (32 out of 50), California law enshrines English as its official language, and has done so since the passage of Proposition 63 by California voters in 1986. Various government agencies do, and are often required to, furnish documents in the various languages needed to reach their intended audiences.

Spanish is the most commonly spoken language in California behind English, spoken by 28.18% (10,434,308) of the state's population in 2021. The Spanish language has been spoken in California since 1542 and is deeply intertwined with California's cultural landscape and history. Spanish was the official administrative language of California through the Spanish and Mexican eras, until 1848. Following the U.S. Conquest of California and the Treaty of Guadalupe-Hidalgo, the U.S. federal government guaranteed the rights of Spanish-speaking Californians. The first Constitution of California was written in both languages at the Monterey Constitutional Convention of 1849 and protected the rights of Spanish speakers to use their language in government proceedings and mandating that all government documents be published in both English and Spanish.

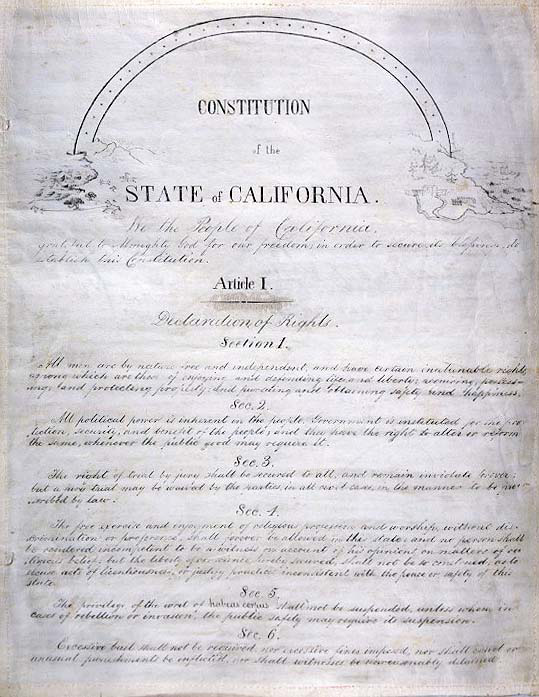
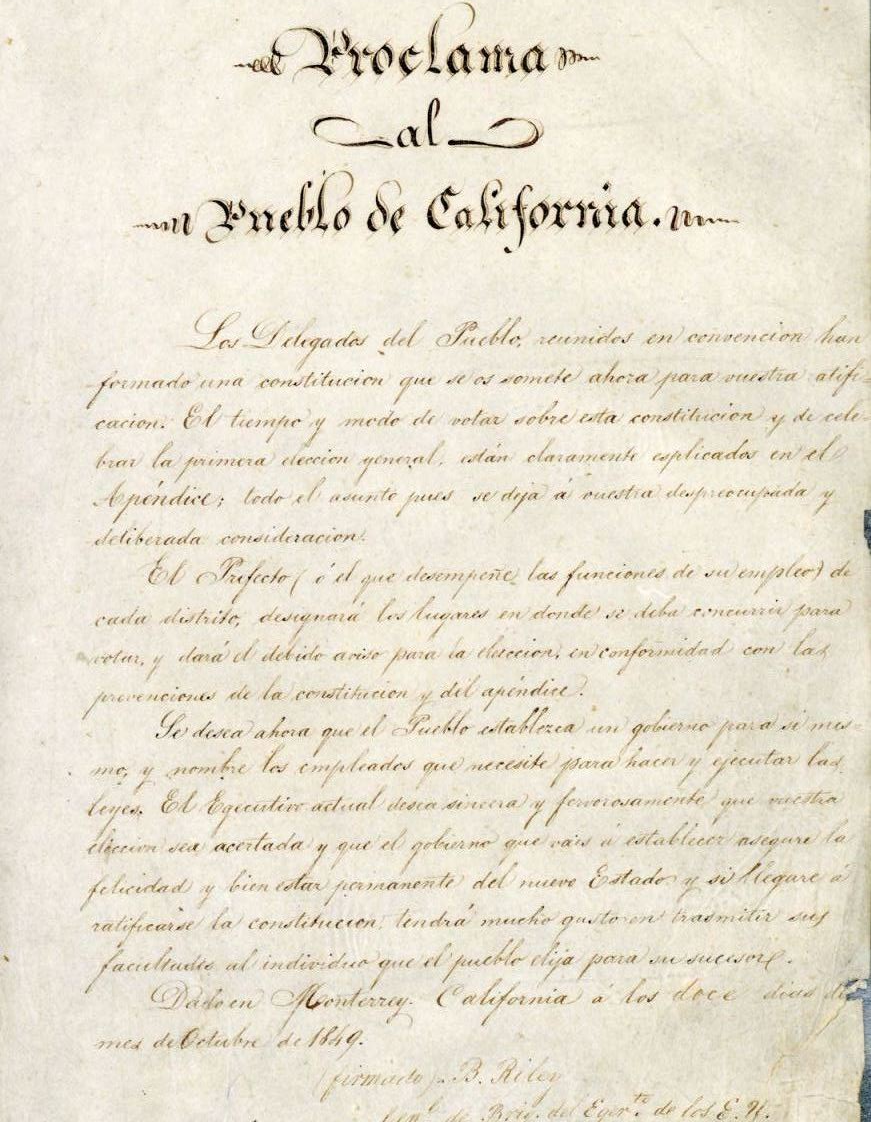
The Constitution of California was written in both English (left) and Spanish (right) by both American and Californio delegates.

Despite the initial recognition of Spanish by early American governments in California, the revised 1879 state constitution stripped the rights of Spanish speakers and the official status of Spanish. The growth of the English-only movement by the mid-20th century led to the passage of 1986 California Proposition 63, which enshrined English as the only official language in California and ended Spanish as a language of instruction in public schools. 2016 California Proposition 58 reversed the prohibition on bilingual education, though there are still many barriers to the proliferation of Spanish bilingual education, including a shortage of teachers and lack of funding. The government of California has since made efforts to promote Spanish language access and bilingual education, as have private educational institutions in California. Many businesses in California promote Spanish language skills for their employees, to better serve both California's Hispanic population and the larger Spanish-speaking world.

California has historically been one of the most linguistically diverse areas in the world, with more than 70 Indigenous languages derived from 64 root languages in six language families. A survey conducted between 2007 and 2009 identified 23 different Indigenous languages among California farmworkers. All of California's Indigenous languages are endangered, although there are now efforts toward language revitalization. (Note: The following are a list of the Indigenous languages: Root languages of California: Athabaskan Family: Hupa, Mattole, Lassik, Wailaki, Sinkyone, Cahto, Tolowa, Nongatl, Wiyot, Chilula; Hokan Family: Pomo, Shasta, Karok, Chimiriko; Algonquian Family: Whilkut, Yurok; Yukian Family: Wappo; Penutian Family: Modok, Wintu, Nomlaki, Konkow, Maidu, Patwin, Nisenan, Miwok, Coast Miwok, Lake Miwok, Ohlone, Northern Valley Yokuts, Southern Valley Yokuts, Foothill Yokuts; Hokan Family: Esselen, Salinan, Chumash, Ipai, Tipai, Yuma, Halchichoma, Mohave; Uto-Aztecan Family: Mono Paiute, Monache, Owens Valley Paiute, Tubatulabal, Panamint Shoshone, Kawaisu, Kitanemuk, Tataviam, Gabrielino, Juaneno, Luiseno, Cuipeno, Cahuilla, Serrano, Chemehuevi) California has the highest concentration nationwide of Chinese, Vietnamese and Punjabi speakers.

As a result of the state's increasing diversity and migration from other areas across the country and around the globe, linguists began noticing a noteworthy set of emerging characteristics of spoken American English in California since the late 20th century. This variety, known as California English, has a vowel shift and several other phonological processes that are different from varieties of American English used in other regions of the U.S.

=== Religion ===
Religious self-identification, per Public Religion Research Institute's 2021 American Values Survey
1. Catholicism (34.0%)
2. Protestantism (27.0%)
3. Jehovah's Witness (1.00%)
4. Mormonism (1.00%)
5. Unaffiliated (28.0%)
6. Buddhism (2.00%)
7. Judaism (1.00%)
8. Hinduism (1.00%)
9. Other (5.00%)

The largest religious denominations by number of adherents as a percentage of California's population in 2014 were the Catholic Church with 28%, Evangelical Protestants with 20%, and Mainline Protestants with 10%. Together, all kinds of Protestants accounted for 32%. Those unaffiliated with any religion represented 27% of the population. The breakdown of other religions is 1% Muslim, 2% Hindu and 2% Buddhist. This is a change from 2008, when the population identified their religion with the Catholic Church with 31%; Evangelical Protestants with 18%; and Mainline Protestants with 14%. In 2008, those unaffiliated with any religion represented 21% of the population. The breakdown of other religions in 2008 was 0.5% Muslim, 1% Hindu and 2% Buddhist. The American Jewish Year Book placed the total Jewish population of California at about 1,194,190 in 2006. According to the Association of Religion Data Archives (ARDA) the largest denominations by adherents in 2010 were the Catholic Church with 10,233,334; The Church of Jesus Christ of Latter-day Saints with 763,818; and the Southern Baptist Convention with 489,953.

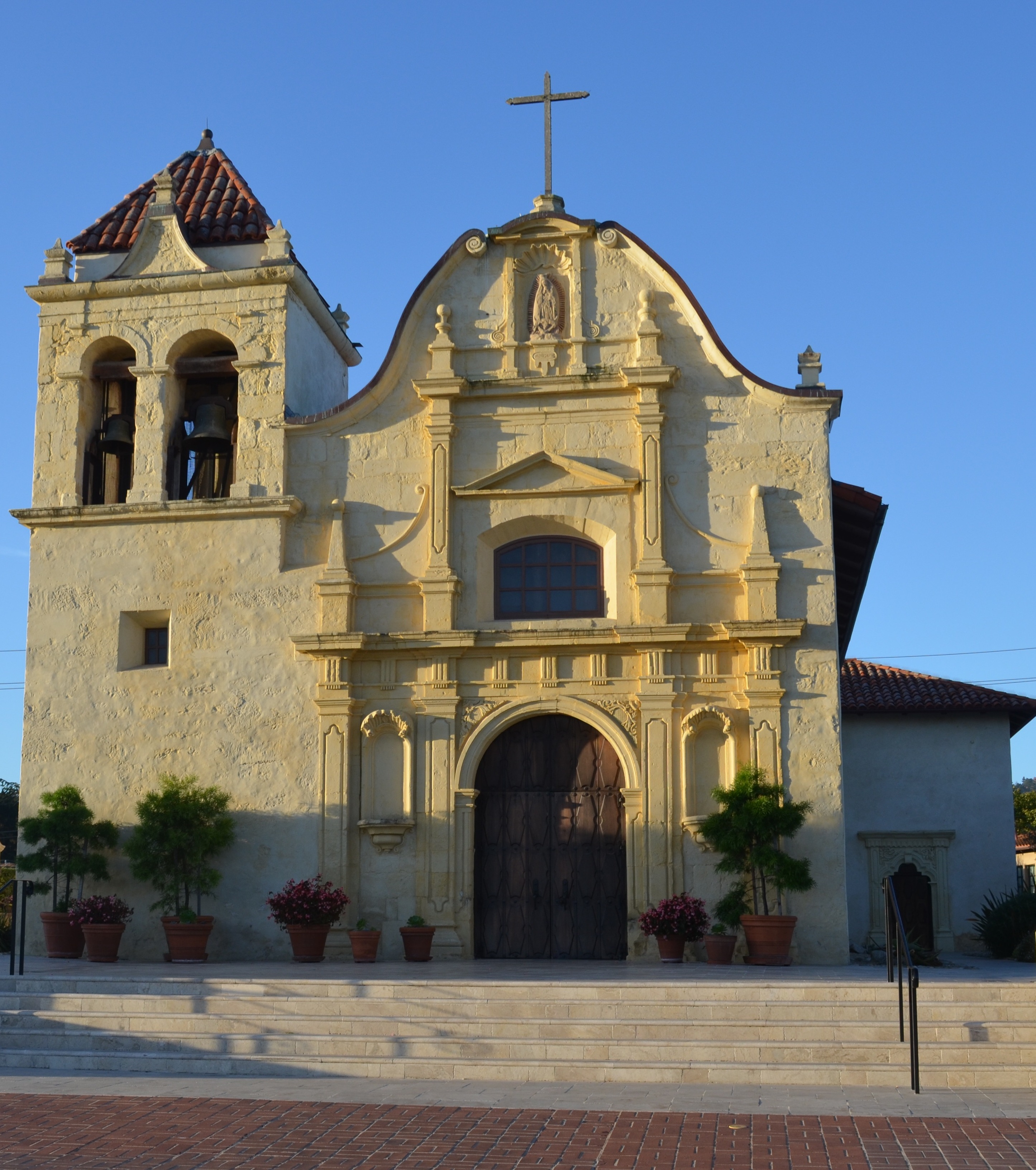
The Cathedral of San Carlos Borromeo in Monterey, built 1791–94, is the oldest parish in California.

California has a large Catholic population due to the large numbers of Mexicans and Central Americans living within its borders. California has twelve dioceses and two archdioceses, the Archdiocese of Los Angeles and the Archdiocese of San Francisco, the former being the largest archdiocese in the U.S.

A Pew Research Center survey revealed that California is somewhat less religious than the rest of the states: 62% of Californians say they are "absolutely certain" of their belief in God, while in the nation 71% say so. The survey also revealed 48% of Californians say religion is "very important", compared to 56% nationally.

== Culture ==
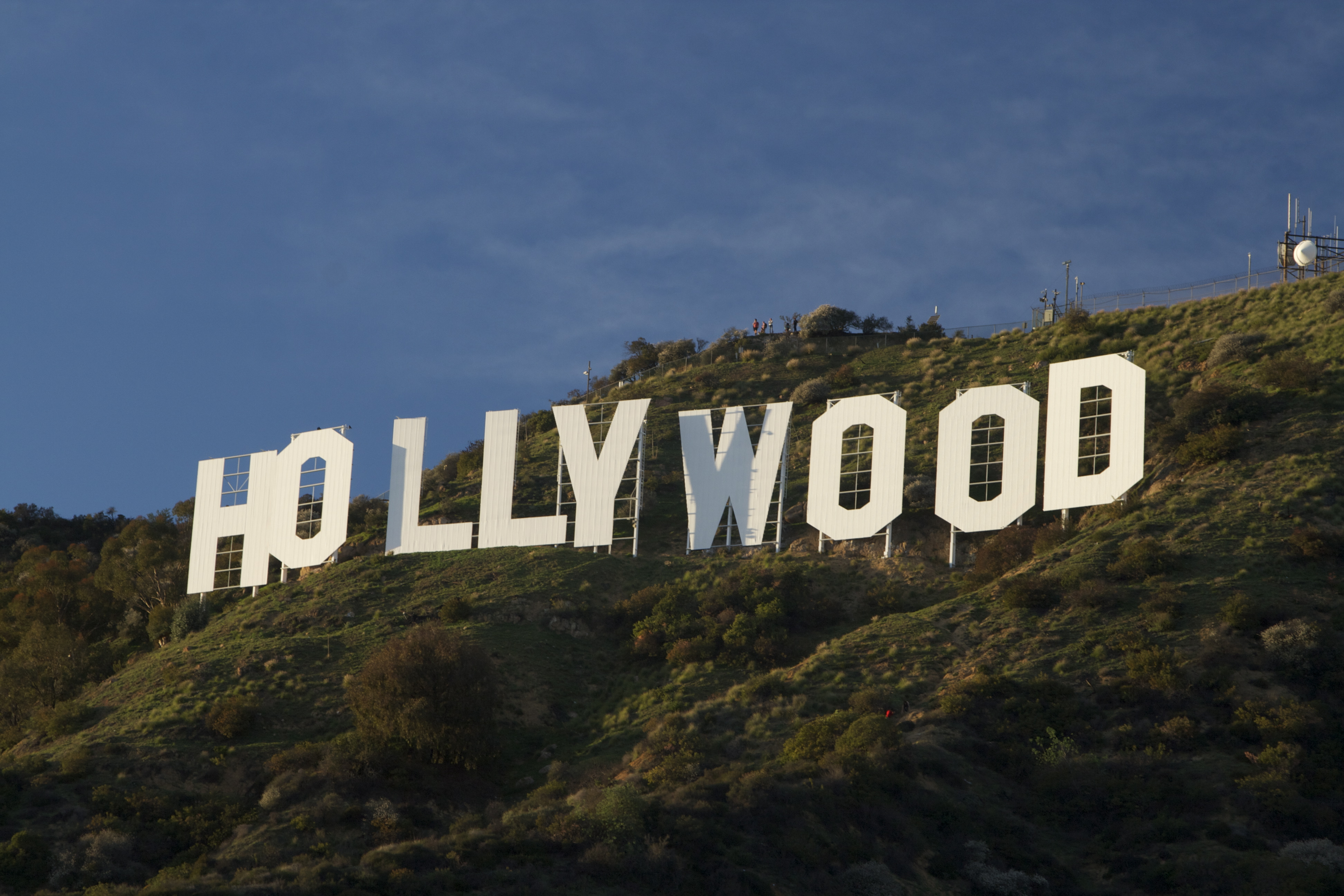
The Hollywood Sign in Los Angeles

The culture of California is a Western culture and has its modern roots in U.S. culture, but also, historically, many Hispanic Californio and Mexican influences. As a border and coastal state, California culture has been greatly influenced by several large immigrant populations, especially those from Latin America and Asia.

California has long been a subject of interest in the public mind and has often been promoted by its boosters as a kind of paradise. In the early 20th century, fueled by the efforts of state, the building projects during the Great Depression and local boosters, many Americans saw the Golden State as an ideal resort destination, sunny and dry all year round with easy access to the ocean and mountains. In the 1960s, popular music groups such as the Beach Boys promoted the image of Californians as laid-back, tanned beach-goers.

=== Motion picture entertainment ===
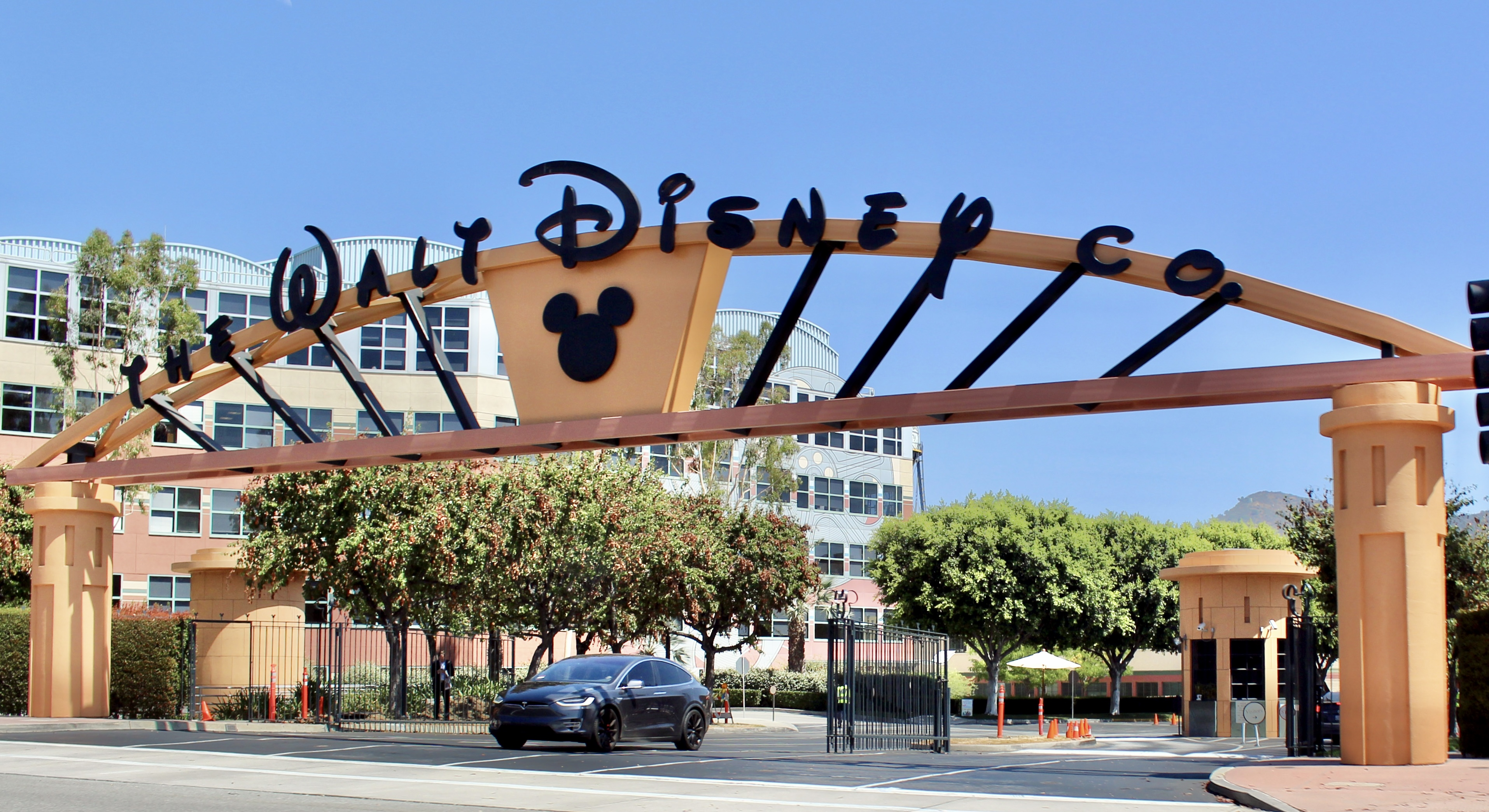
Disney, headquartered in Burbank, is one of the world's largest media and entertainment companies.

Hollywood and the rest of the Los Angeles area is a major global center for motion picture entertainment, with the U.S. film industry's "Big Five" major film studios (Columbia, Disney, Paramount, Universal, and Warner Bros.) as well as many minor film studios being based in or around the area. Many animation studios are also headquartered in the state. The four major American television commercial broadcast networks (ABC, CBS, NBC, and Fox) as well as other networks all have production facilities and offices in the state. All the four major commercial broadcast networks, plus the two major Spanish-language networks (Telemundo and Univision) each have at least three owned-and-operated TV stations in California, including at least one in Los Angeles and at least one in San Francisco. (Note: ABC has the least amount of owned-and-operated TV stations with three: KABC-TV in Los Angeles, KGO-TV in San Francisco, and KFSN-TV in Fresno.)

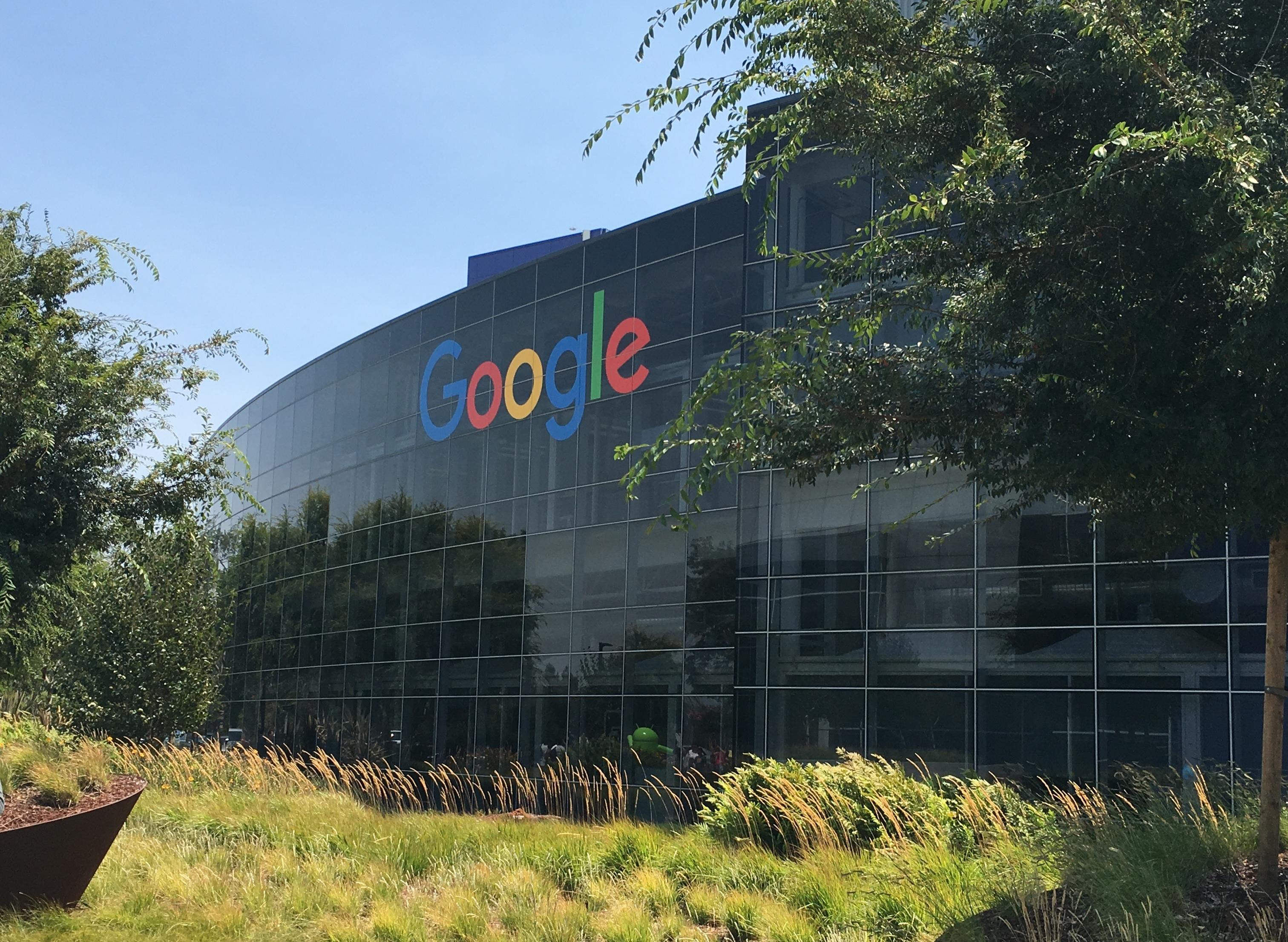
Google, headquartered in Mountain View, is one of the largest technology companies in the world.

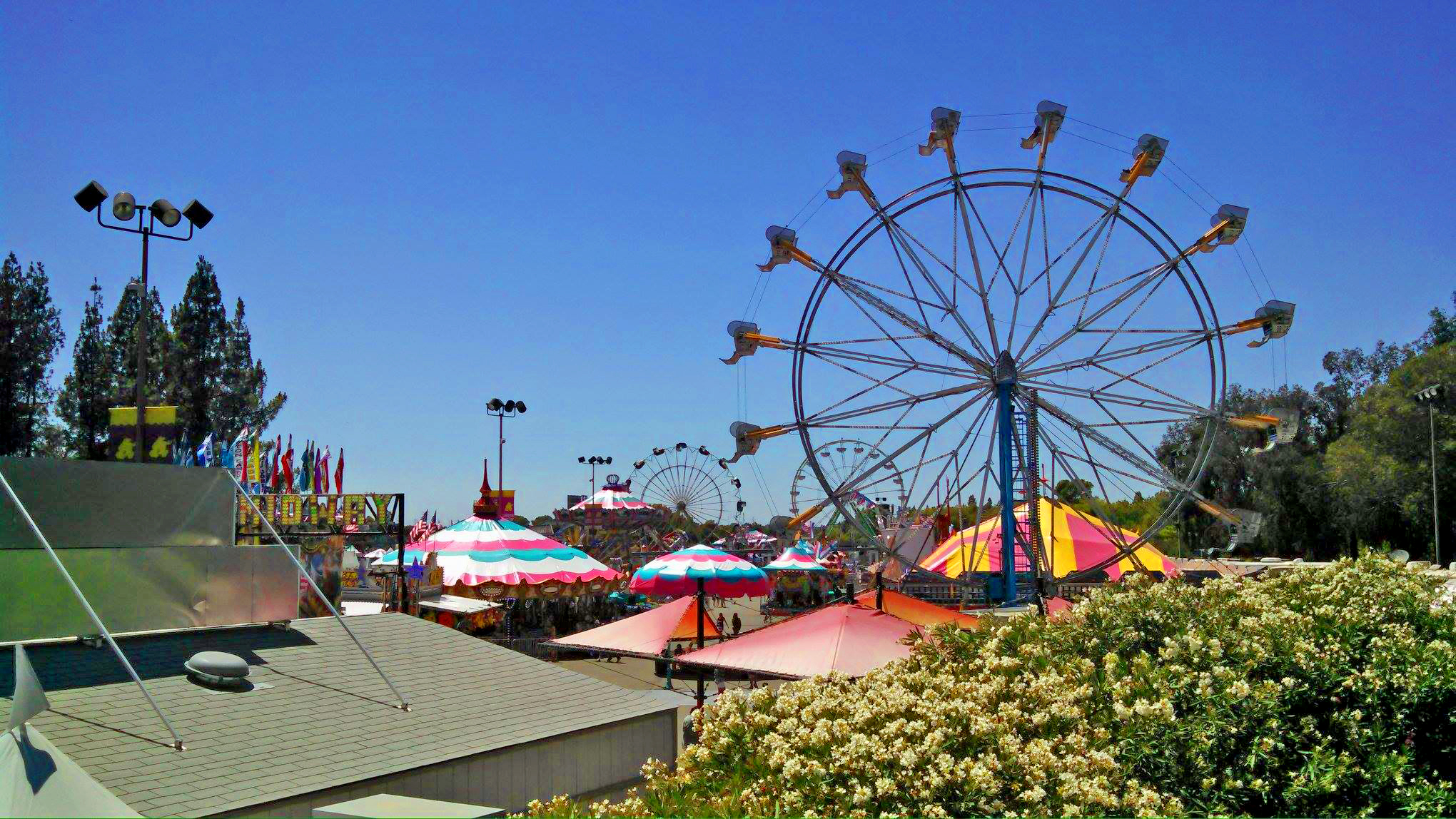
The California State Fair is held annually during the summer at Cal Expo in northeastern Sacramento.

One of the oldest radio stations in the U.S. still in existence, KCBS (AM) in the San Francisco Bay Area, was founded in 1909. Universal Music Group, one of the "Big Four" record labels, is based in Santa Monica, while Warner Records is based in Los Angeles. Many independent record labels, such as Mind of a Genius Records, are also headquartered in the state. California is also the birthplace of several international music genres, including the Bakersfield sound, Bay Area thrash metal, alternative rock, g-funk, nu metal, glam metal, thrash metal, psychedelic rock, stoner rock, punk rock, hardcore punk, metalcore, pop-punk, surf music, third wave ska, west coast hip-hop, west coast jazz, jazz rap, and many other genres. Other genres such as pop rock, indie rock, hard rock, hip-hop, pop, rock, rockabilly, country, heavy metal, grunge, new wave and disco were popularized in the state. In addition, many British bands, such as Led Zeppelin, Deep Purple, Black Sabbath, and the Rolling Stones settled in the state after becoming internationally famous.

As the home of Silicon Valley, the Bay Area is the headquarters of several prominent internet media, social media, and other technology companies. Three of the "Big Five" technology companies (Apple, Meta, and Google) are based in the area as well as other services such as Netflix, Pandora Radio, Twitter, Yahoo!, and YouTube. Other prominent companies that are headquartered here include HP inc. and Intel. Microsoft and Amazon also have offices in the area.

=== Car culture ===
Car culture in California, particularly Southern California, is considered the birthplace of modern car culture.

=== Food ===
Several fast food, fast casual, and casual dining chains were also founded California, including some that have since expanded internationally like California Pizza Kitchen, Denny's, IHOP, McDonald's, Panda Express, and Taco Bell.

=== Sports ===
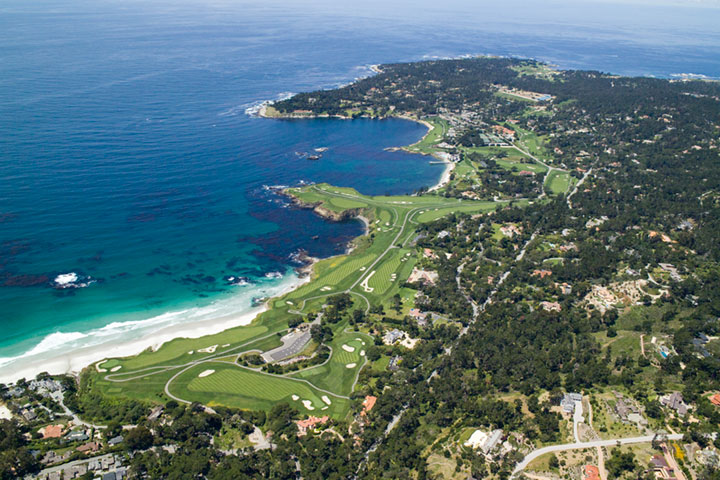
Pebble Beach Golf Links, one of the best ranked golf courses in the world

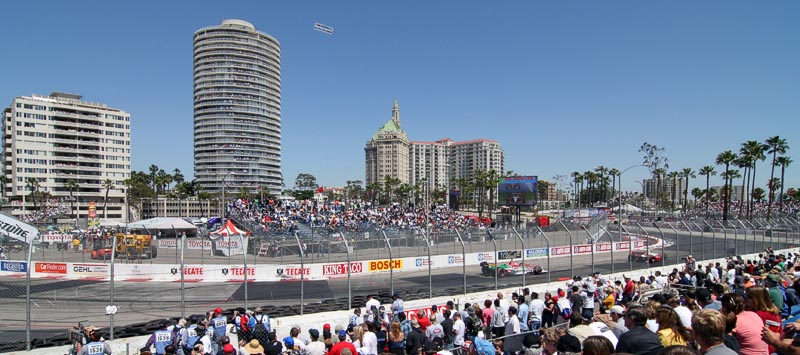
The Grand Prix of Long Beach is the longest running major street race in North America.

California has 19 major professional sports league franchises, far more than any other state. The San Francisco Bay Area has five major league teams, while the Greater Los Angeles Area is home to ten. San Diego has two major league teams and Sacramento has two. The NFL Super Bowl has been hosted in California 12 times at five different stadiums: Los Angeles Memorial Coliseum, the Rose Bowl, Stanford Stadium, Levi's Stadium, and San Diego Stadium. A thirteenth, Super Bowl LVI, was held at SoFi Stadium in Inglewood on February 13, 2022.

California has long had many respected collegiate sports programs. California is home to the oldest college bowl game, the annual Rose Bowl, among others.

The NFL has three teams in the state: the Los Angeles Rams, Los Angeles Chargers, and San Francisco 49ers.

MLB has five teams in the state: the San Francisco Giants, Los Angeles Dodgers, Los Angeles Angels, San Diego Padres, and the Athletics, which plan to move to Las Vegas by 2028.

The NBA has four teams in the state: the Golden State Warriors, Los Angeles Clippers, Los Angeles Lakers, and Sacramento Kings. Additionally, the WNBA also has two teams in the state: the Los Angeles Sparks and Golden State Valkyries.

The NHL has three teams in the state: the Anaheim Ducks, Los Angeles Kings, and San Jose Sharks.

MLS has four teams in the state: the Los Angeles Galaxy, San Jose Earthquakes, Los Angeles FC, and San Diego FC, while NWSL has three teams in California: Angel City FC, Bay FC, and San Diego Wave FC.

MLR has one team in the state: the San Diego Legion.

California is the only U.S. state to have hosted both the Summer and Winter Olympics. The 1932 and 1984 summer games were held in Los Angeles. Squaw Valley Ski Resort (now Palisades Tahoe) in the Lake Tahoe region hosted the 1960 Winter Olympics. Los Angeles will host the 2028 Summer Olympics, marking the fourth time that California will have hosted the Olympic Games.

Multiple games during the 1994 FIFA World Cup took place in California, with the Rose Bowl hosting eight matches (including the final), while Stanford Stadium hosted six matches.

SoFi Stadium in Los Angeles hosted eight matches during the 2026 World Cup, including five group stage fixtures, two Round of 32 clashes, and a Quarter-Final. Levi's Stadium in Santa Clara hosted six matches, including five group stage matches, and the Round of 32 match between the USMNT and Bosnia and Herzegovina.

In addition to the Olympic games, California also hosts the California State Games.

Many sports, such as surfing, snowboarding, and skateboarding, were invented in California, while others like volleyball, beach soccer, and skiing were popularized in the state.

Other sports that are big in the state include golf, rodeo, tennis, mountain climbing, marathon running, horse racing, bowling, mixed martial arts, boxing, and motorsports, especially NASCAR and Formula One.

Los Angeles Memorial Coliseum hosted the Summer Olympics in 1932 and 1984, and will also host in 2028.

Team	Sport	League
Los Angeles Rams	American football	National Football League (NFL)
Los Angeles Chargers	American football	National Football League
San Francisco 49ers	American football	National Football League
Los Angeles Dodgers	Baseball	Major League Baseball (MLB)
Los Angeles Angels	Baseball	Major League Baseball
San Diego Padres	Baseball	Major League Baseball
San Francisco Giants	Baseball	Major League Baseball
Golden State Warriors	Basketball	National Basketball Association (NBA)
Los Angeles Clippers	Basketball	National Basketball Association
Los Angeles Lakers	Basketball	National Basketball Association
Sacramento Kings	Basketball	National Basketball Association
Golden State Valkyries	Basketball	Women's National Basketball Association (WNBA)
Los Angeles Sparks	Basketball	Women's National Basketball Association
Anaheim Ducks	Ice hockey	National Hockey League (NHL)
Los Angeles Kings	Ice hockey	National Hockey League
San Jose Sharks	Ice hockey	National Hockey League
Los Angeles Galaxy	Soccer	Major League Soccer (MLS)
San Jose Earthquakes	Soccer	Major League Soccer
Los Angeles FC	Soccer	Major League Soccer
San Diego FC	Soccer	Major League Soccer
Angel City FC	Soccer	National Women's Soccer League (NWSL)
San Diego Wave FC	Soccer	National Women's Soccer League
San Diego Legion	Rugby union	Major League Rugby

== Education ==
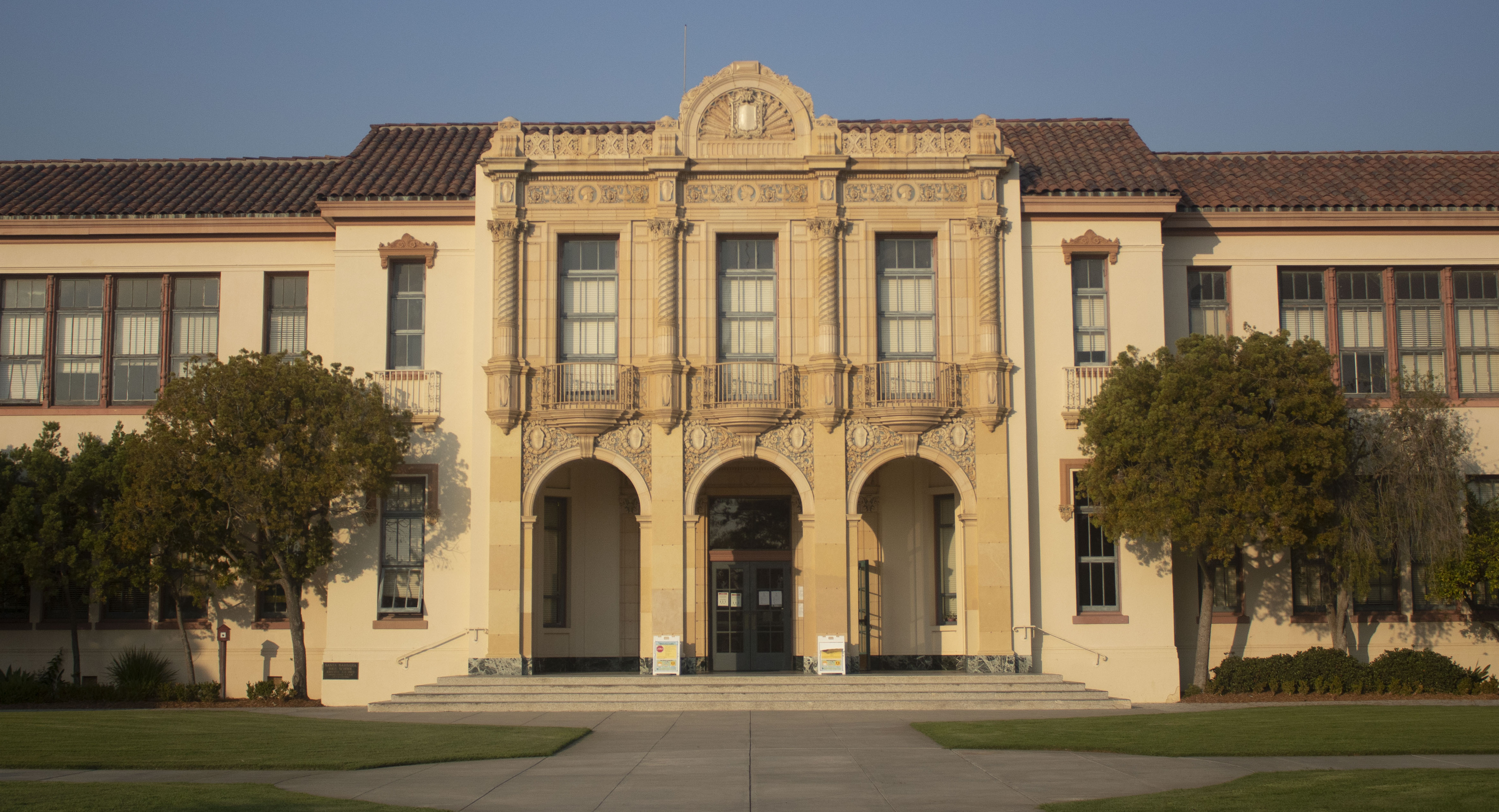
Santa Barbara High School, one of the oldest high schools in continuous use in Southern California

California has the most school students in the country, with over 6.2 million in the 2005–06 school year, giving California more students in school than 36 states have in total population and one of the highest projected enrollments in the country. Public secondary education consists of high schools that teach elective courses in trades, languages, and liberal arts with tracks for gifted, college-bound and industrial arts students. California's public educational system is supported by a unique constitutional amendment that requires a minimum annual funding level for grades K–12 and community colleges that grows with the economy and student enrollment figures.

In 2016, California's K–12 public school per-pupil spending was ranked 22nd in the nation ($11,500 per student vs. $11,800 for the U.S. average).

For 2012, California's K–12 public schools ranked 48th in the number of employees per student, at 0.102 (the U.S. average was 0.137), while paying the 7th most per employee, $49,000 (the U.S. average was $39,000).

=== Higher education ===
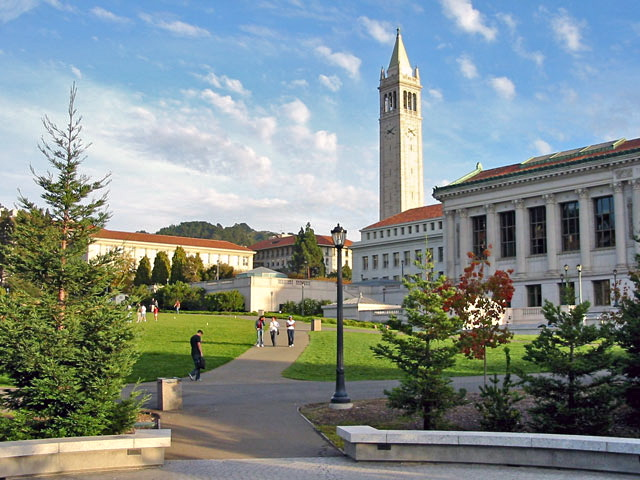
UC Berkeley is the oldest campus of the University of California, and the state's flagship public university.

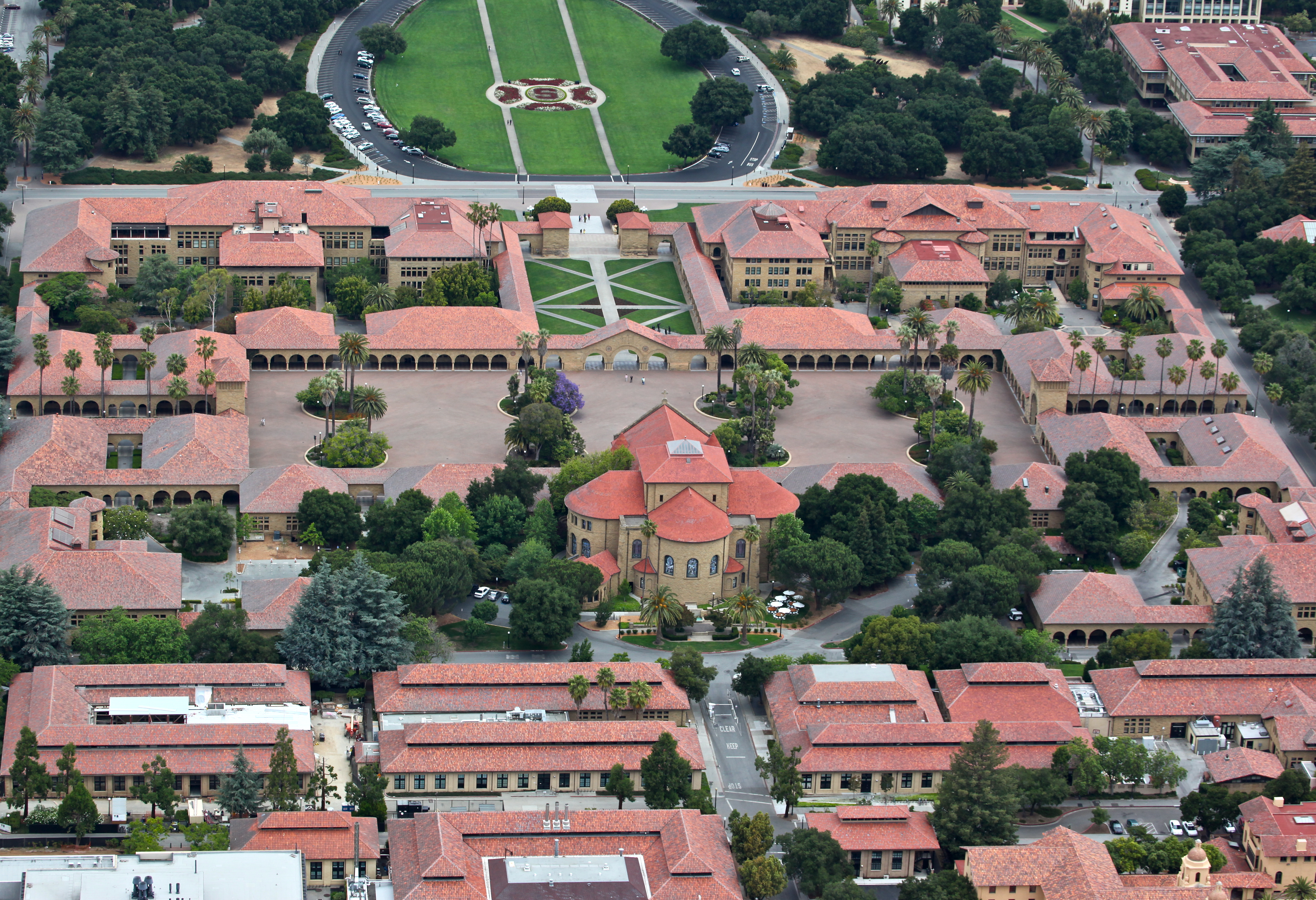
Stanford University is a private university that is one of the top-ranked universities in the world.

California public postsecondary education is organized into three separate systems:

- The state's public research university system is the University of California (UC). As of fall 2011, the University of California had a combined student body of 234,464 students. There are ten UC campuses; nine are general campuses offering both undergraduate and graduate programs which culminate in the award of bachelor's degrees, master's degrees, and doctorates; there is one specialized campus, UC San Francisco, which is entirely dedicated to graduate education in health care, and is home to the UCSF Medical Center, the highest-ranked hospital in California. The system was originally intended to accept the top one-eighth of California high school students, but several of the campuses have become even more selective. The UC system historically held exclusive authority to award the doctorate, but this has since changed and CSU now has limited statutory authorization to award a handful of types of doctoral degrees independently of UC.
- The California State University (CSU) system has almost 430,000 students. The CSU (which takes the definite article in its abbreviated form, while UC does not) was originally intended to accept the top one-third of California high school students, but several of the campuses have become much more selective. The CSU was originally authorized to award only bachelor's and master's degrees, and could award the doctorate only as part of joint programs with UC or private universities. Since then, CSU has been granted the authority to independently award several doctoral degrees (in specific academic fields that do not intrude upon UC's traditional jurisdiction).
- The California Community Colleges system provides lower-division coursework culminating in the associate degree, as well as basic skills and workforce training culminating in various kinds of certificates. (Fifteen California community colleges now award four-year bachelor's degrees in disciplines which are in high demand in their geographical area.) It is the largest network of higher education in the U.S., composed of 112 colleges serving a student population of over 2.6 million.

California is also home to notable private universities such as Stanford University, the California Institute of Technology (Caltech), the University of Southern California, the Claremont Colleges, Santa Clara University, Loyola Marymount University, the University of San Diego, the University of San Francisco, Chapman University, Pepperdine University, Occidental College, and University of the Pacific, among numerous other private colleges and universities, including many religious and special-purpose institutions. California has a particularly high density of arts colleges, including the California College of the Arts, California Institute of the Arts, San Francisco Art Institute, Art Center College of Design, and Academy of Art University, among others.

== Economy ==
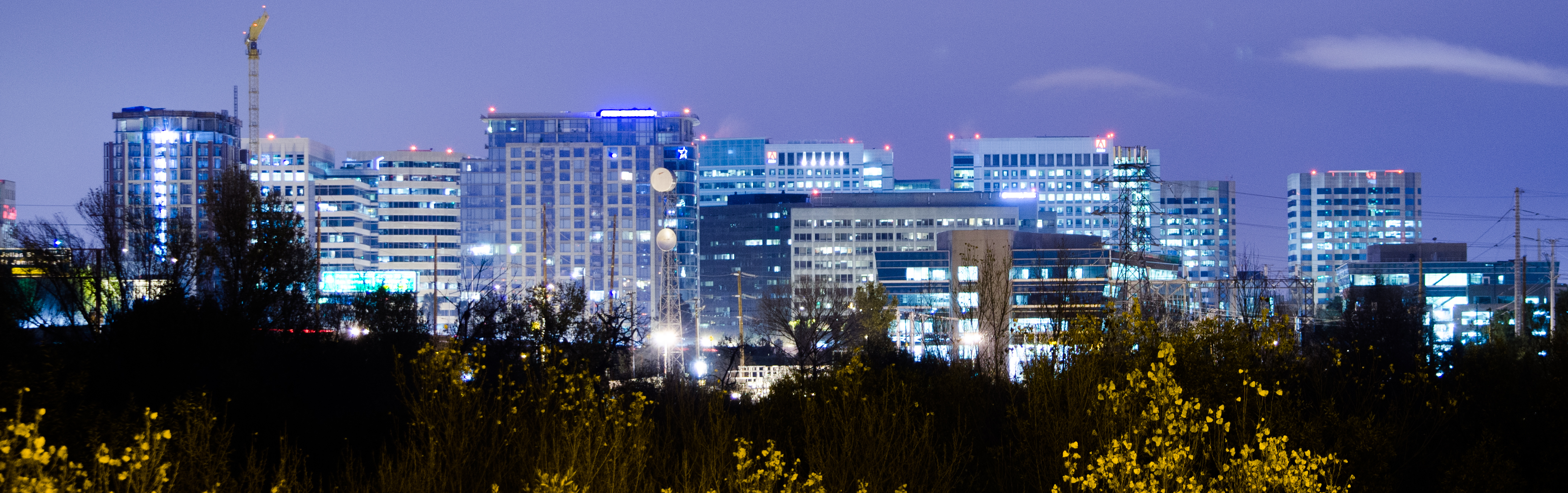
Silicon Valley is the largest tech hub in the world and home to Big Tech companies like Apple, Alphabet, Meta, Nvidia, Intel, HP, Netflix, Inc., Uber, and many more.

According to the U.S. Bureau of Economic Analysis, in 2025, California's gross state product (GSP) was $4.250 trillion, the largest of any U.S. state and the state's per capita personal income was $91,116. California is responsible for one seventh of the nation's gross domestic product (GDP). As of 2025, California's nominal GDP is larger than all but four countries. In terms of purchasing power parity (PPP), it is larger than all but eight countries. California's economy is larger than Africa's and Australia's and is almost as large as South America's. The state recorded total, non-farm employment of 16,677,800 as of September 2021 among 966,224 employer establishments. As of 2024, California is home to 57 of the Fortune 500 companies, the highest number of any U.S. state. In 2025, 465,101 businesses formed in California, the second highest in the country behind Florida. As of 2025, 4.3 million small businesses were in the state, making up 99.8% of businesses, and employing 47.4% of the state's work force.

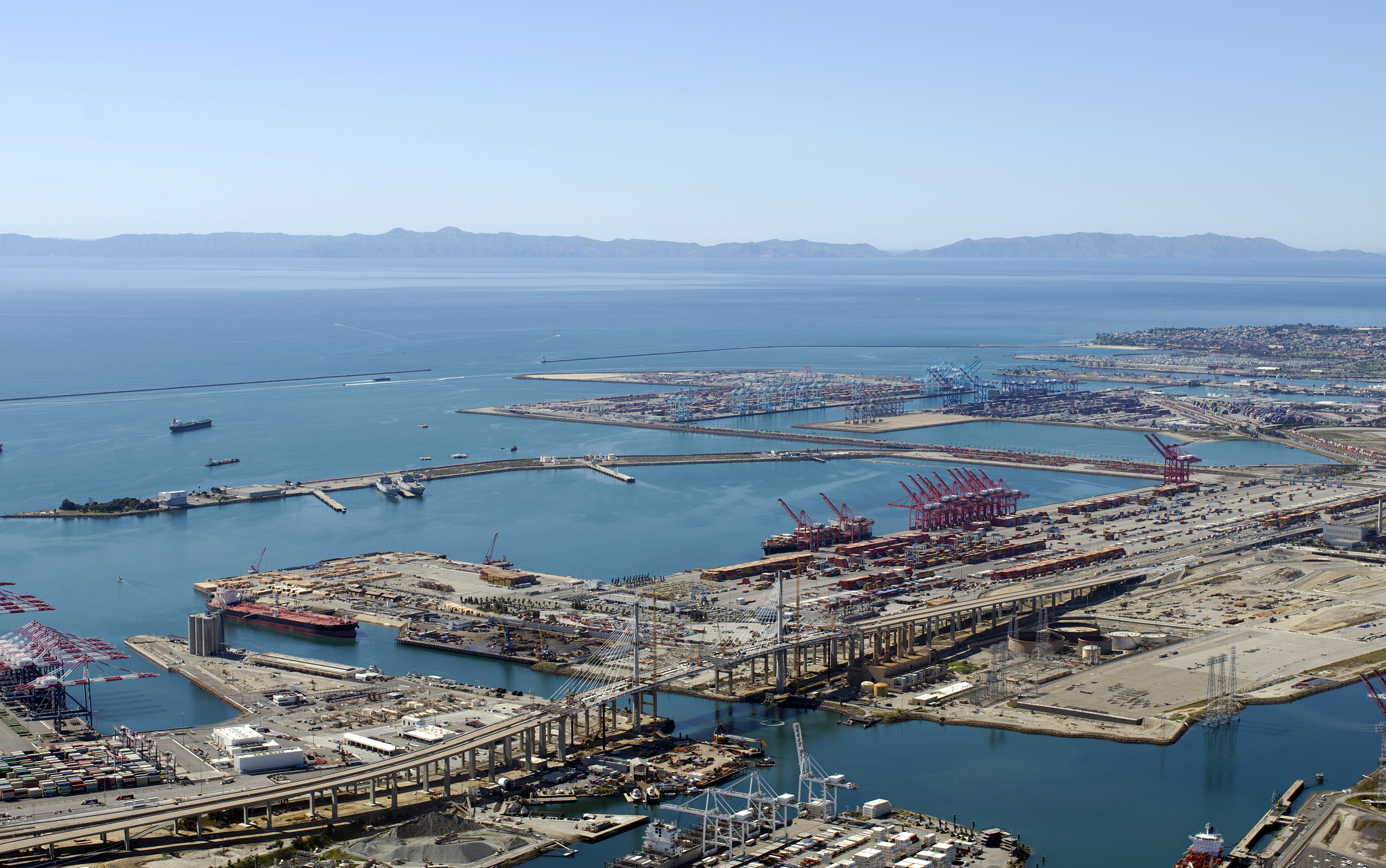
The combined Port of Los Angeles-Port of Long Beach is the largest port in the U.S. by import volume and one of the busiest ports in the world.

As the largest and second-largest U.S. ports respectively, the Port of Los Angeles and the Port of Long Beach in Southern California collectively play a pivotal role in the global supply chain, together hauling in about 40% of all imports to the U.S. by TEU volume. The Port of Oakland and Port of Hueneme are the 10th and 26th largest seaports in the U.S., respectively, by number of TEUs handled.

The five largest sectors of employment in California are trade, transportation, and utilities; government; professional and business services; education and health services; and leisure and hospitality. In output, the five largest sectors are financial services, followed by trade, transportation, and utilities; education and health services; government; and manufacturing. California has an unemployment rate of 5.3% as of May 2025.

California's economy is dependent on trade and international related commerce accounts for about one-quarter of the state's economy, and representing 7% of their GDP; California's biggest trade partner is Mexico. In 2008, California exported $144 billion worth of goods, up from $134 billion in 2007 and $127 billion in 2006. Vehicles, computers and electronic products are California's top exports, accounting for 42% of all the state's exports in 2008; over 50 car companies operate in California, such as Tesla and Mazda.

=== Agriculture ===
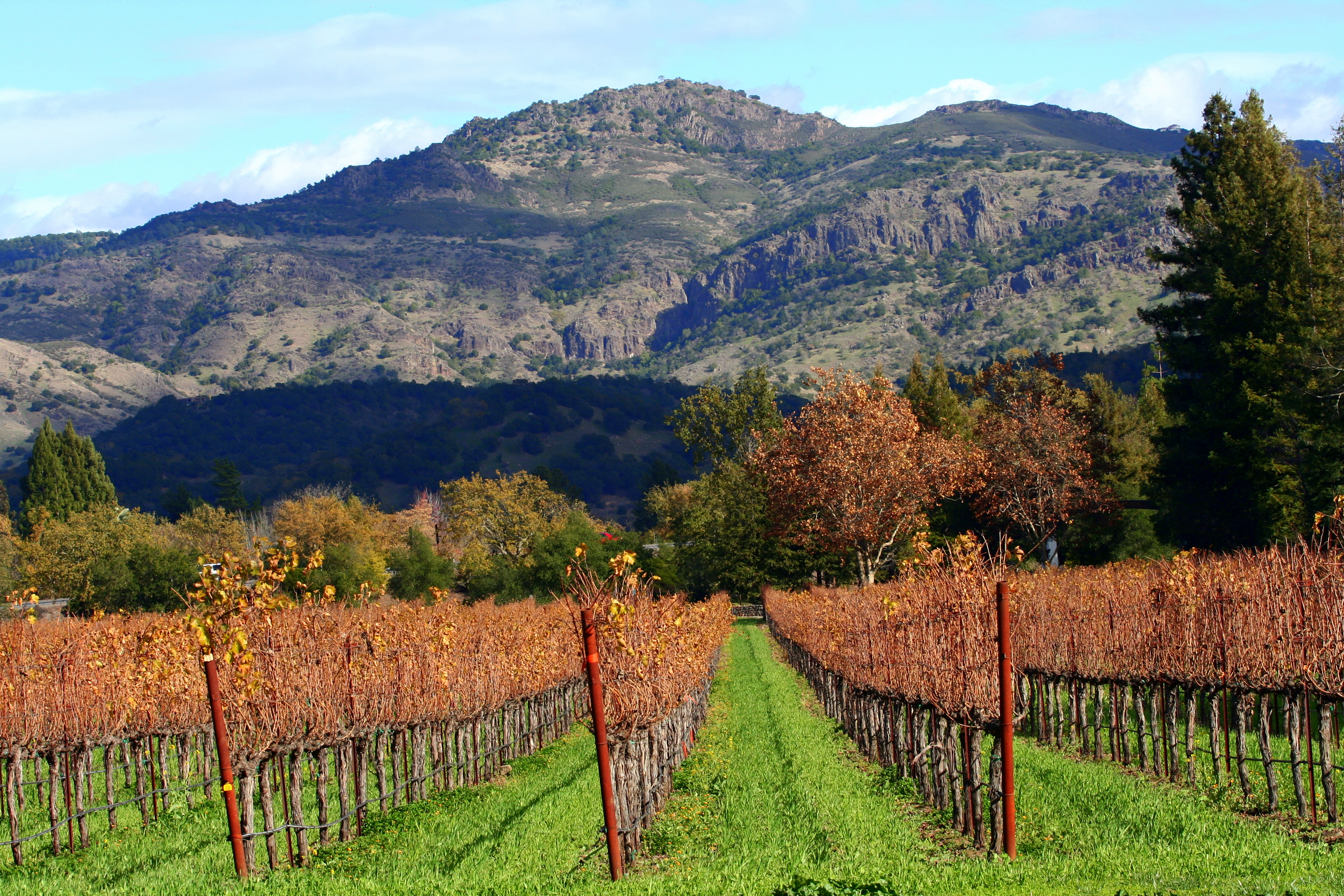
California vineyards in Wine Country. The agricultural industry in California is the largest in the U.S.

Agriculture is an important sector in California's economy. According to the U.S. Department of Agriculture, in 2011, the three largest California agricultural products by value were milk and cream, shelled almonds, and grapes. Farming-related sales more than quadrupled over the past three decades, from $7.3 billion in 1974 to nearly $31 billion in 2004. This increase has occurred despite a 15% decline in acreage devoted to farming during the period, and water supply suffering from chronic instability. Factors contributing to the growth in sales-per-acre include more intensive use of active farmlands and technological improvements in crop production. In 2008, California's 81,500 farms and ranches generated $36.2 billion products revenue. In 2011, that number grew to $43.5 billion products revenue. The agriculture sector accounts for 2% of the state's GDP and employs around 3% of its total workforce.

=== Income ===
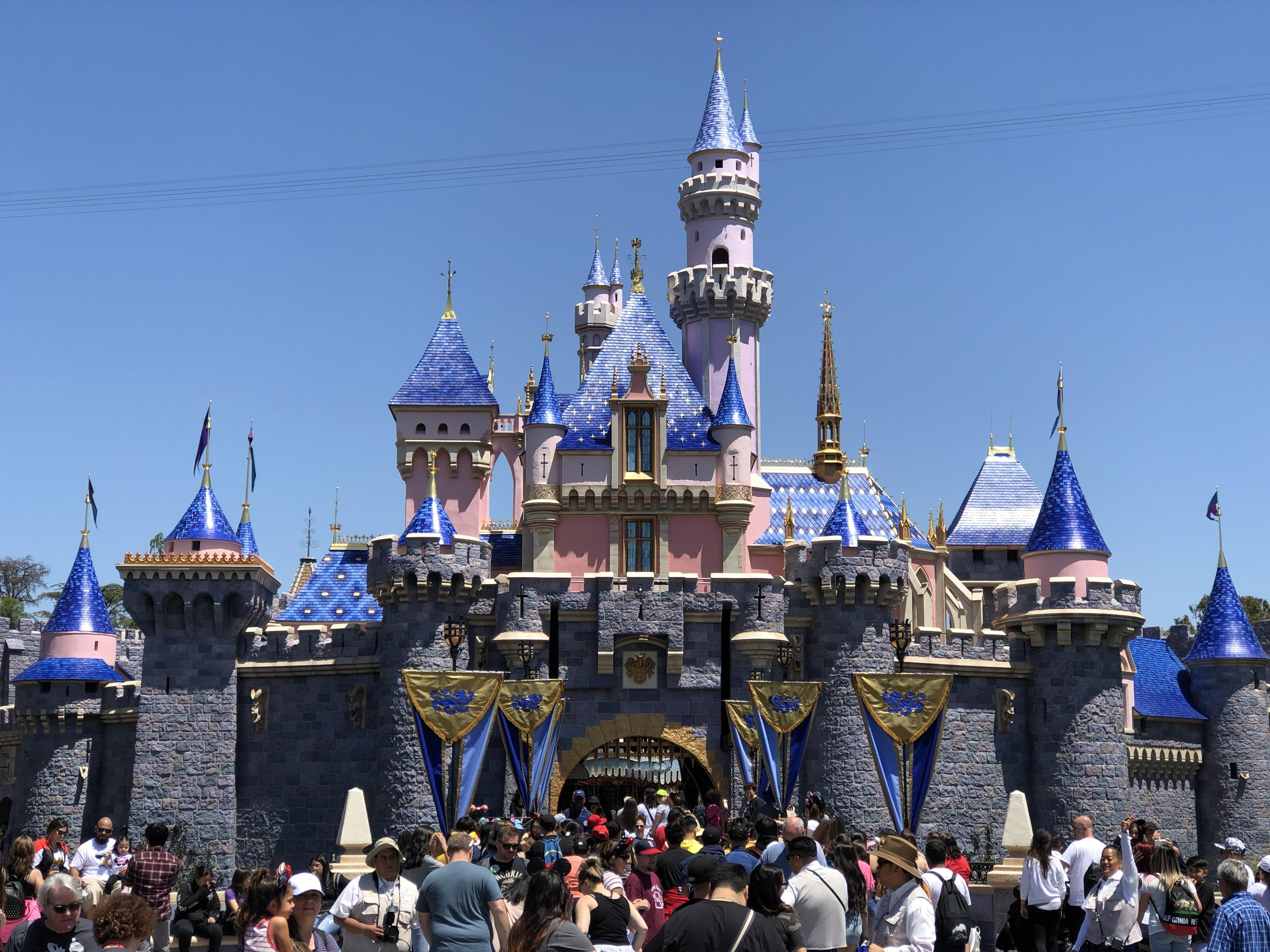
California is the most visited state in the country. Disneyland in Anaheim is a major tourist destination, with 16.9 million annual visits in 2022.

Per capita GDP in 2021 was $85,546, ranking fourth in the nation. Per capita income varies widely by geographic region and profession. The Central Valley is the most impoverished, with migrant farm workers making less than minimum wage. According to a 2005 report by the Congressional Research Service, the San Joaquin Valley was characterized as one of the most economically depressed regions in the U.S., on par with the region of Appalachia.

Using the supplemental poverty measure, California has a poverty rate of 23.5%, the highest of any state in the country. However, using the official measure the poverty rate was only 13.3% as of 2017. Many coastal cities include some of the wealthiest per-capita areas in the U.S. The high-technology sectors in Northern California, specifically Silicon Valley, in Santa Clara and San Mateo counties, have emerged from the economic downturn caused by the dot-com bust.

In 2019, there were 1,042,027 millionaire households in the state, more than any other state in the nation. In 2010, California residents were ranked first among the states with the best average credit score of 754.

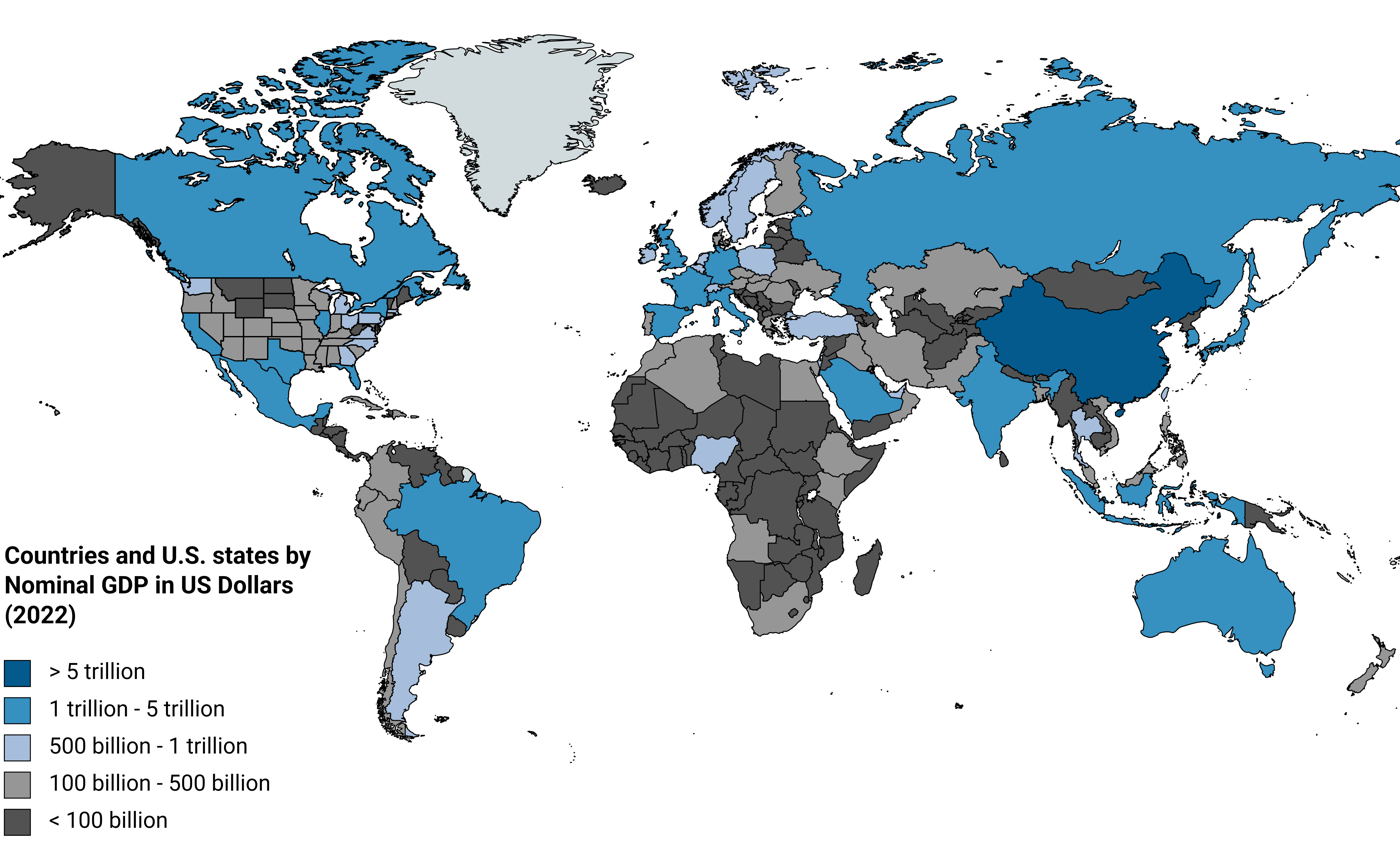
If California was an independent country, its gross domestic product (nominal) would rank fifth in the world (2022).

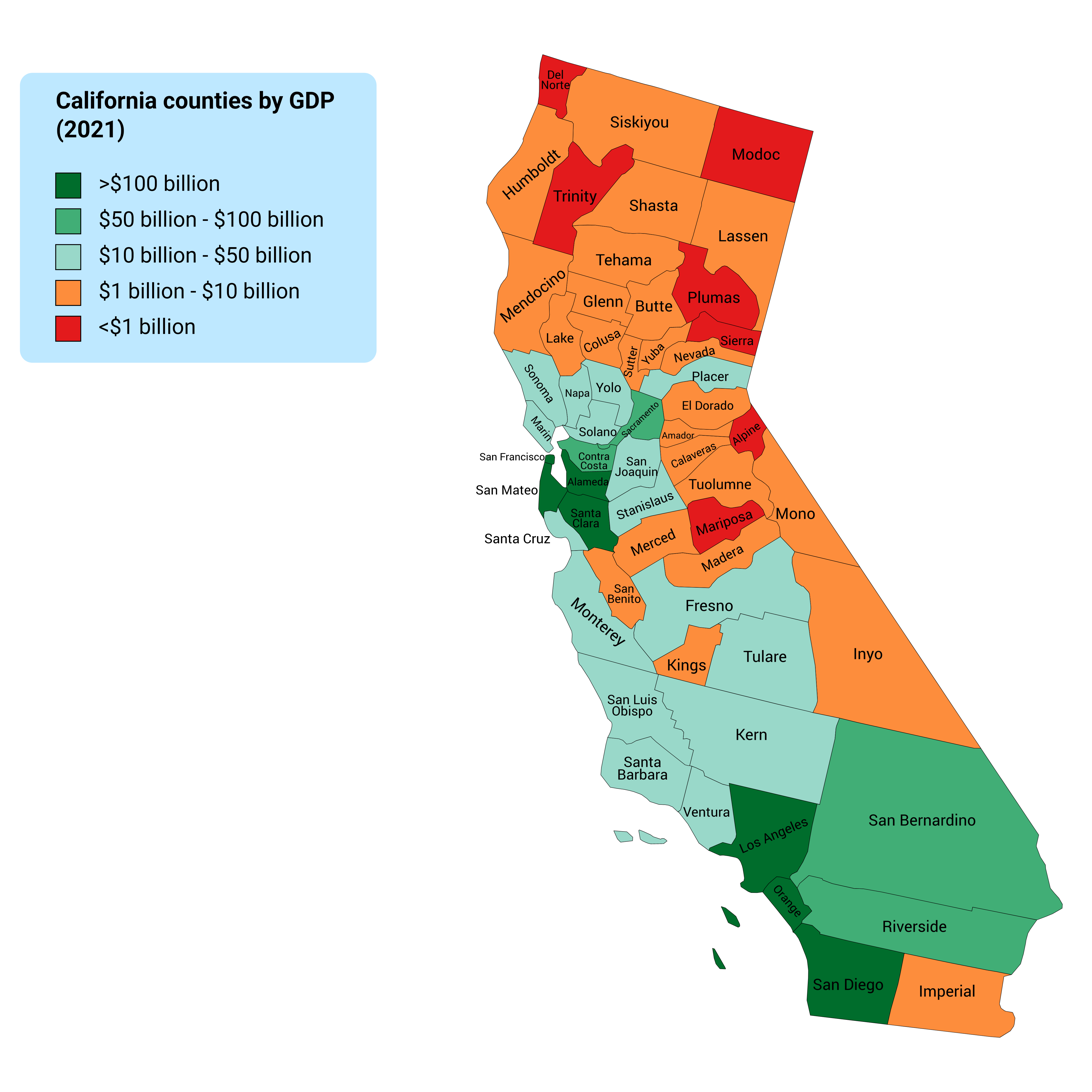
California counties by GDP (2021)

=== State finances ===
California economic regions

State spending increased from $56 billion in 1998 to $127 billion in 2011. California has the third highest per capita spending on welfare among the states, as well as the highest spending on welfare at $6.67 billion. In January 2011, California's total debt was at least $265 billion. On June 27, 2013, Governor Jerry Brown signed a balanced budget (no deficit) for the state, its first in decades; however, the state's debt remains at $132 billion.

With the passage of Proposition 30 in 2012 and Proposition 55 in 2016, California now levies a 13.3% maximum marginal income tax rate with ten tax brackets, ranging from 1% at the bottom tax bracket of $0 annual individual income to 13.3% for annual individual income over $1,000,000 (though the top brackets are only temporary until Proposition 55 expires at the end of 2030). While Proposition 30 also enacted a minimum state sales tax of 7.5%, this sales tax increase was not extended by Proposition 55 and reverted to a previous minimum state sales tax rate of 7.25% in 2017. Local governments can and do levy additional sales taxes in addition to this minimum rate.

All real property is taxable annually. Property tax increases are capped at 2% annually or the rate of inflation (whichever is lower), per Proposition 13.

=== Energy ===
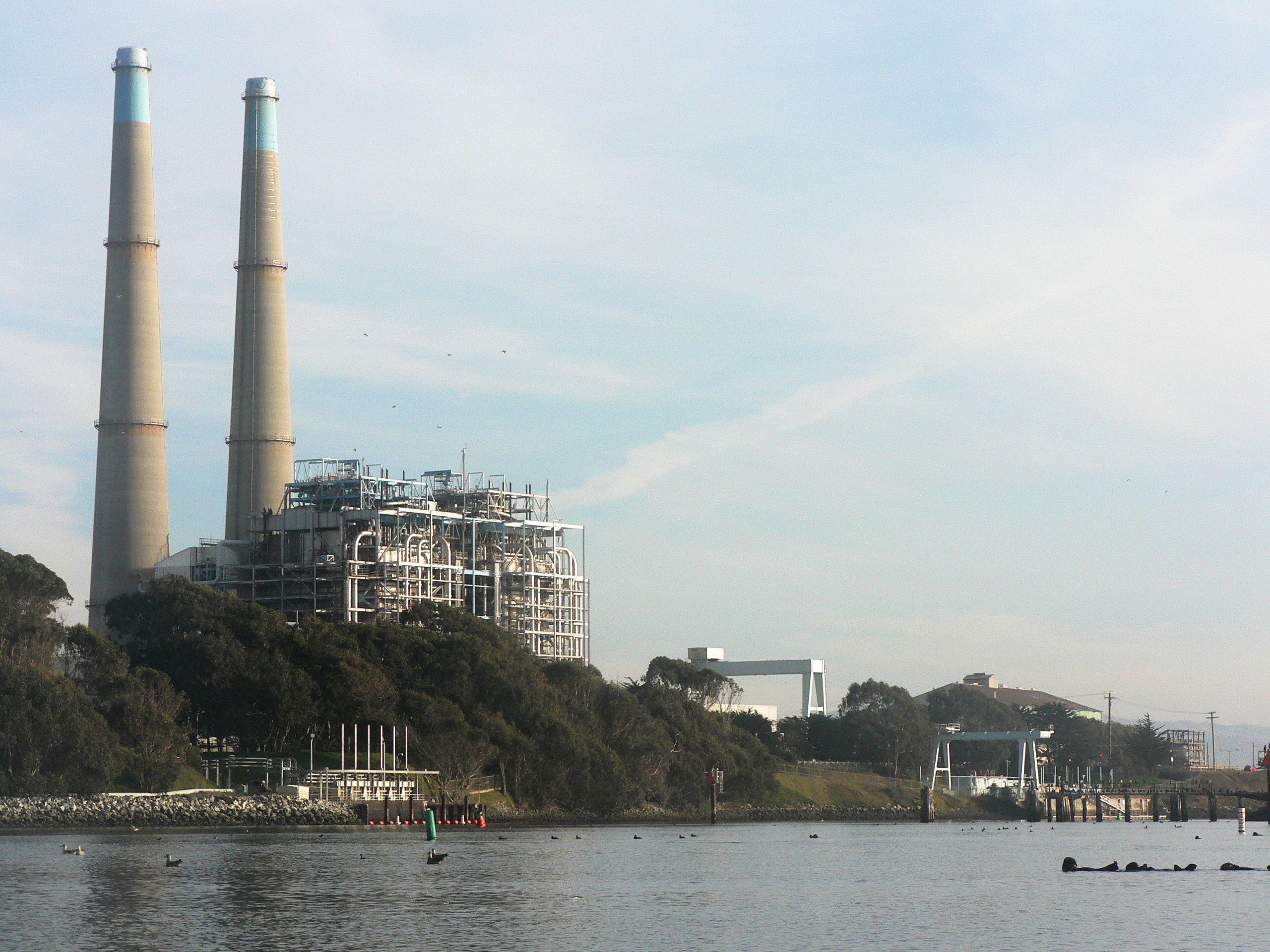
Moss Landing Power Plant, located on the coast of Monterey Bay

Because it is the most populous state in the U.S., California is one of the country's largest users of energy. The state has extensive hydro-electric energy generation facilities, however, moving water is the single largest energy use in the state. Also, due to high energy rates, conservation mandates, mild weather in the largest population centers and strong environmental movement, its per capita energy use is one of the smallest of any state in the U.S. Due to the high electricity demand, California imports more electricity than any other state, primarily hydroelectric power from states in the Pacific Northwest (via Path 15 and Path 66) and coal- and natural gas-fired production from the desert Southwest via Path 46.

The state's crude oil and natural gas deposits are located in the Central Valley and along the coast, including the large Midway-Sunset Oil Field. Natural gas-fired power plants typically account for more than one-half of state electricity generation.

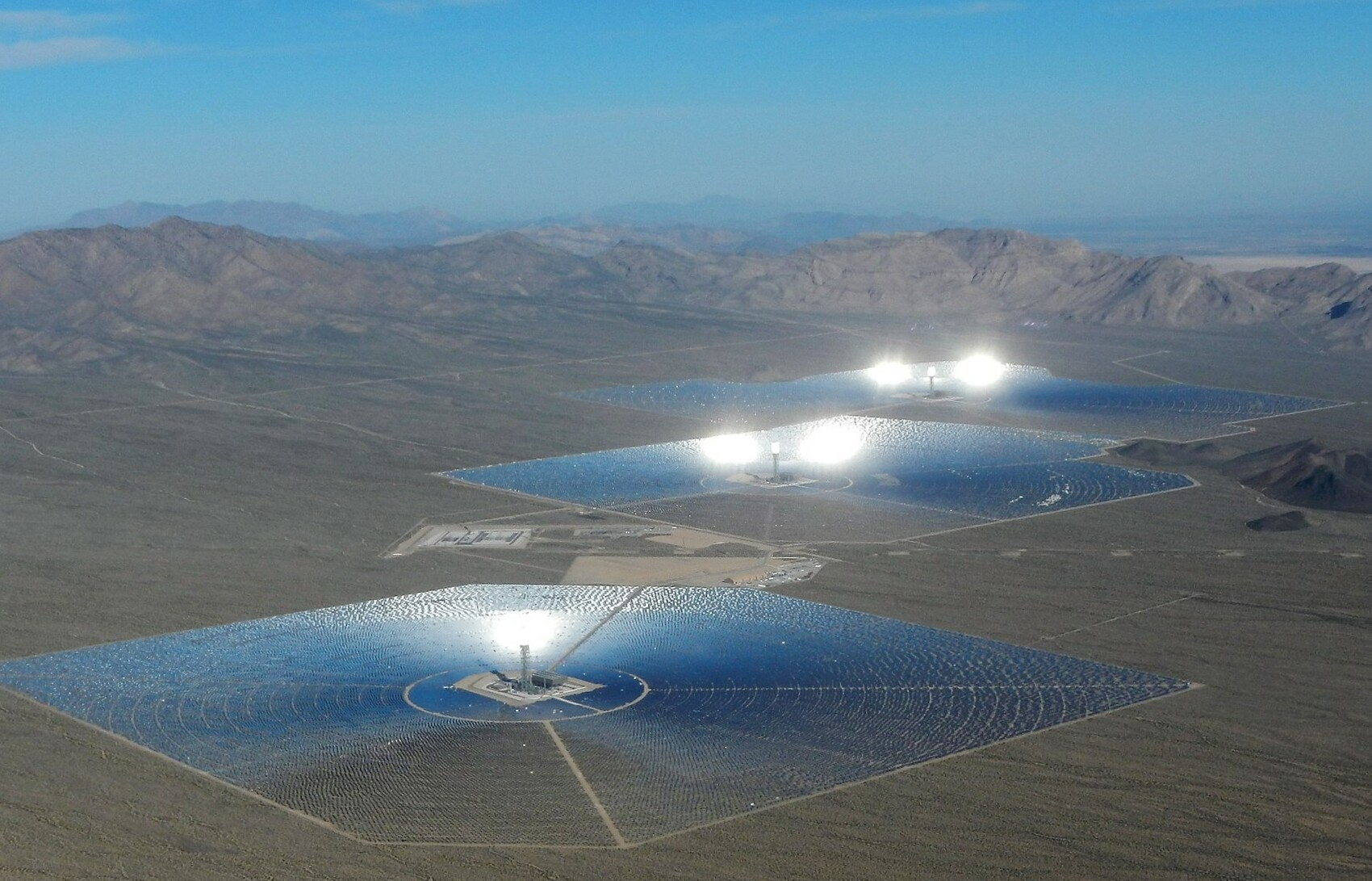
Ivanpah Solar Power Facility, located in the Mojave Desert

As a result of the state's strong environmental movement, California has some of the most aggressive renewable energy goals in the U.S. The Clean Energy, Jobs and Affordability Act of 2022 commits the state to running its operations on clean, renewable energy resources by 2035, and SB 1203 also requires the state to achieve net-zero operations for all agencies. Currently, several solar power plants such as the Solar Energy Generating Systems facility are located in the Mojave Desert. California's wind farms include Altamont Pass, San Gorgonio Pass, and Tehachapi Pass. The Tehachapi area is also where the Tehachapi Energy Storage Project is located. Several dams across the state provide hydro-electric power. It would be possible to convert the total supply to 100% renewable energy, including heating, cooling and mobility, by 2050.

California has one major nuclear power plant (Diablo Canyon) in operation. The San Onofre nuclear plant was shut down in 2013. More than 1,700 tons of radioactive waste are stored at San Onofre, and sit on the coast where there is a record of past tsunamis. Voters banned the approval of new nuclear power plants since the late 1970s because of concerns over radioactive waste disposal. (Note: Minnesota also has a moratorium on construction of nuclear power plants, which has been in place since 1994.) Several cities such as Oakland, Berkeley and Davis have declared themselves as nuclear-free zones.

=== Transportation ===
The Golden Gate Bridge in the San Francisco Bay Area, is one of the most famous bridges in the world.

==== Highways ====
California's vast terrain is connected by an extensive system of controlled-access highways ('freeways'), limited-access roads ('expressways'), and highways. California is known for its car culture, giving California's cities a reputation for severe traffic congestion. Construction and maintenance of state roads and statewide transportation planning are primarily the responsibility of the California Department of Transportation, nicknamed "Caltrans". The rapidly growing population of the state is straining all of its transportation networks, and California has some of the worst roads in the U.S. The Reason Foundation's 19th Annual Report on the Performance of State Highway Systems ranked California's highways the third-worst of any state, with Alaska second, and Rhode Island first.

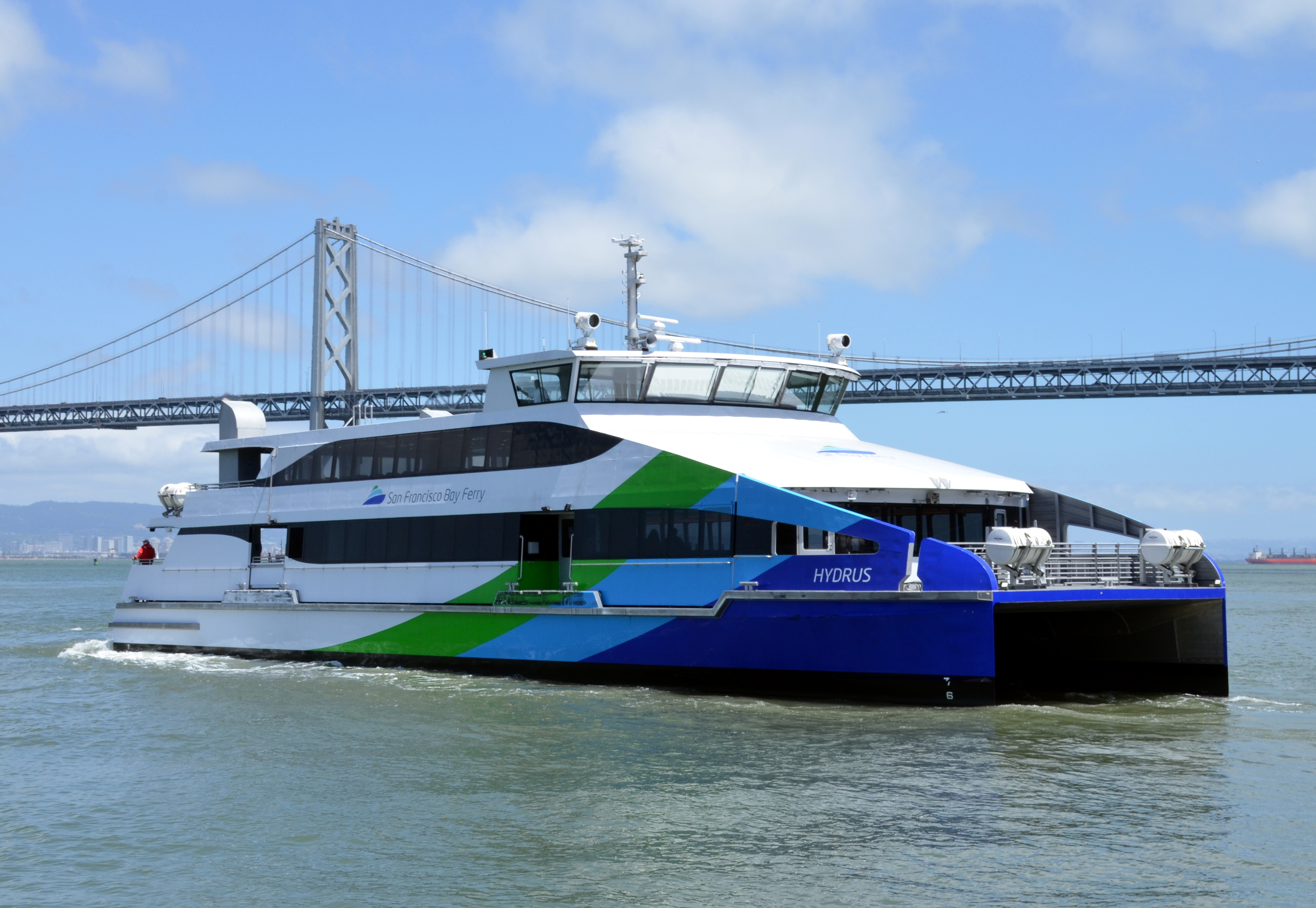
San Francisco Bay Ferry is a public water taxi system in the Bay Area.

The state has been a pioneer in road construction. One of the state's more visible landmarks, the Golden Gate Bridge, was the longest suspension bridge main span in the world at 4,200 feet (1,300 m) between 1937 (when it opened) and 1964. With its orange paint and panoramic views of the bay, this highway bridge is a popular tourist attraction and also accommodates pedestrians and bicyclists. The San Francisco–Oakland Bay Bridge (often abbreviated the "Bay Bridge"), completed in 1936, transports about 280,000 vehicles per day on two-decks. Its two sections meet at Yerba Buena Island through the world's largest diameter transportation bore tunnel, at 76 feet (23 m) wide by 58 feet (18 m) high. The Arroyo Seco Parkway, connecting Los Angeles and Pasadena, opened in 1940 as the first freeway in the Western U.S. It was later extended south to the Four Level Interchange in downtown Los Angeles, regarded as the first stack interchange ever built.

The California Highway Patrol is the largest statewide police agency in the U.S. in employment with more than 10,000 employees. They are responsible for providing any police-sanctioned service to anyone on California's state-maintained highways and on state property.

By the end of 2021, 30,610,058 people in California held a California Department of Motor Vehicles-issued driver's licenses or state identification card, and there were 36,229,205 registered vehicles, including 25,643,076 automobiles, 853,368 motorcycles, 8,981,787 trucks and trailers, and 121,716 miscellaneous vehicles (including historical vehicles and farm equipment).

==== Air travel ====
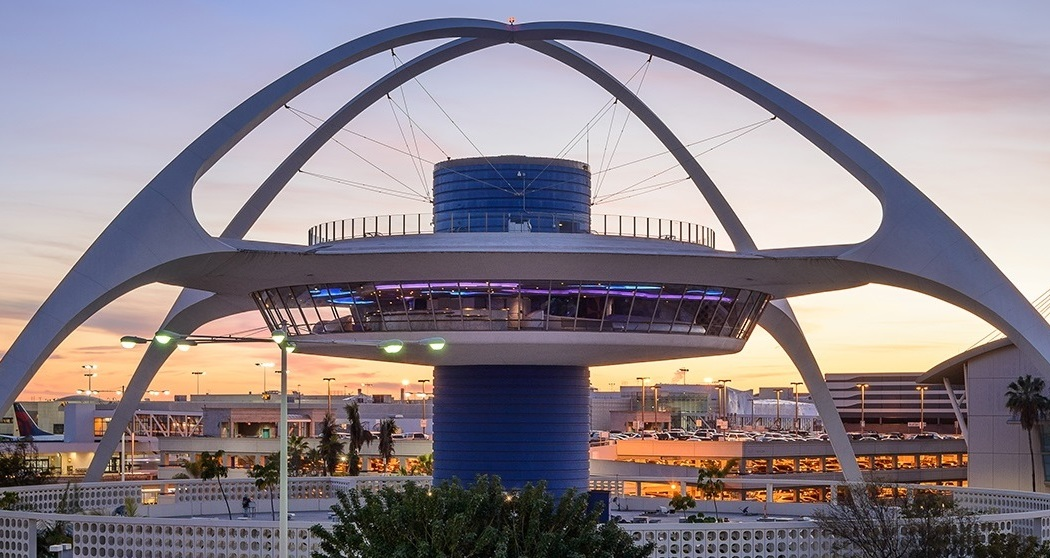
Los Angeles Intl. Airport (LAX) is the 4th busiest airport in the world.

Los Angeles International Airport (LAX), the 4th busiest airport in the world in 2018, and San Francisco International Airport (SFO), the 25th busiest airport in the world in 2018, are major hubs for trans-Pacific and transcontinental traffic. There are about a dozen important commercial airports and many more general aviation airports throughout the state.

==== Railroads ====
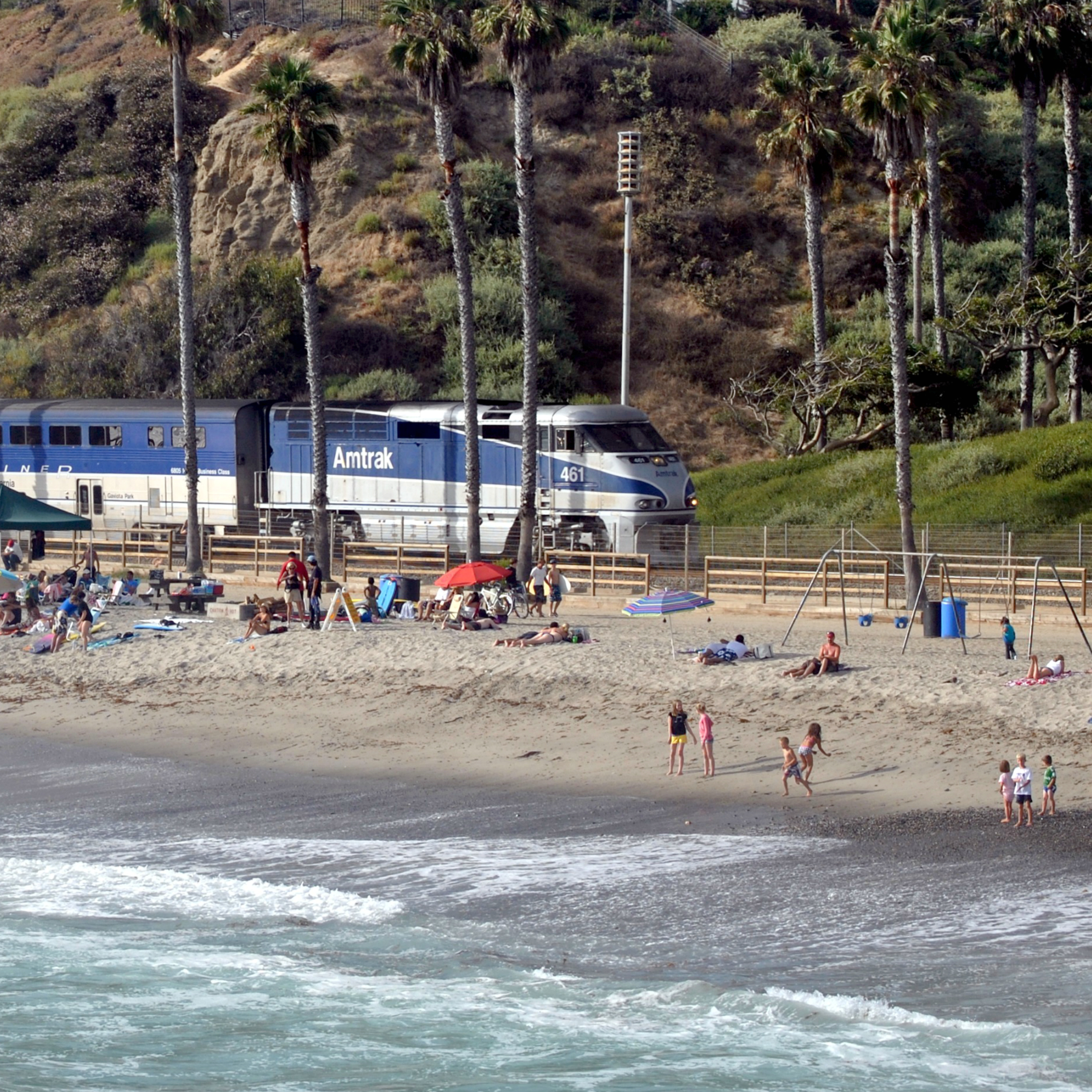
Amtrak California's Pacific Surfliner in San Clemente, on the Orange Coast

Inter-city rail travel is provided by Amtrak California; the three routes, the Capitol Corridor, Pacific Surfliner, and Gold Runner, are funded by Caltrans. These services are the busiest intercity rail lines in the U.S. outside the Northeast Corridor and ridership is continuing to set records. The routes are becoming increasingly popular over flying, especially on the LAX-SFO route. Integrated subway and light rail networks are found in Los Angeles (Los Angeles Metro Rail) and San Francisco (Muni Metro). Light rail systems are also found in San Jose (VTA light rail), San Diego (San Diego Trolley), Sacramento (SacRT light rail), and Northern San Diego County (Sprinter). Furthermore, commuter rail networks serve the San Francisco Bay Area (Altamont Corridor Express, Bay Area Rapid Transit, Caltrain, Sonoma–Marin Area Rail Transit), Greater Los Angeles (Metrolink), and San Diego County (Coaster).

The California High-Speed Rail Authority was authorized in 1996 by the state legislature to plan a California High-Speed Rail system to put before the voters. The plan they devised, 2008 California Proposition 1A, connecting all the major population centers in the state, was approved by the voters at the November 2008 general election. The first phase of construction was begun in 2015, and the first segment 171 miles (275 km) long, is planned to be put into operation by the end of 2030. Planning and work on the rest of the system is continuing, with funding for completing it is an ongoing issue. California's 2023 integrated passenger rail master plan includes a high speed rail system.

==== Busses ====
Nearly all counties operate bus lines, and many cities operate their own city bus lines as well. Intercity bus travel is provided by Greyhound, Megabus, and Amtrak Thruway.

=== Water ===
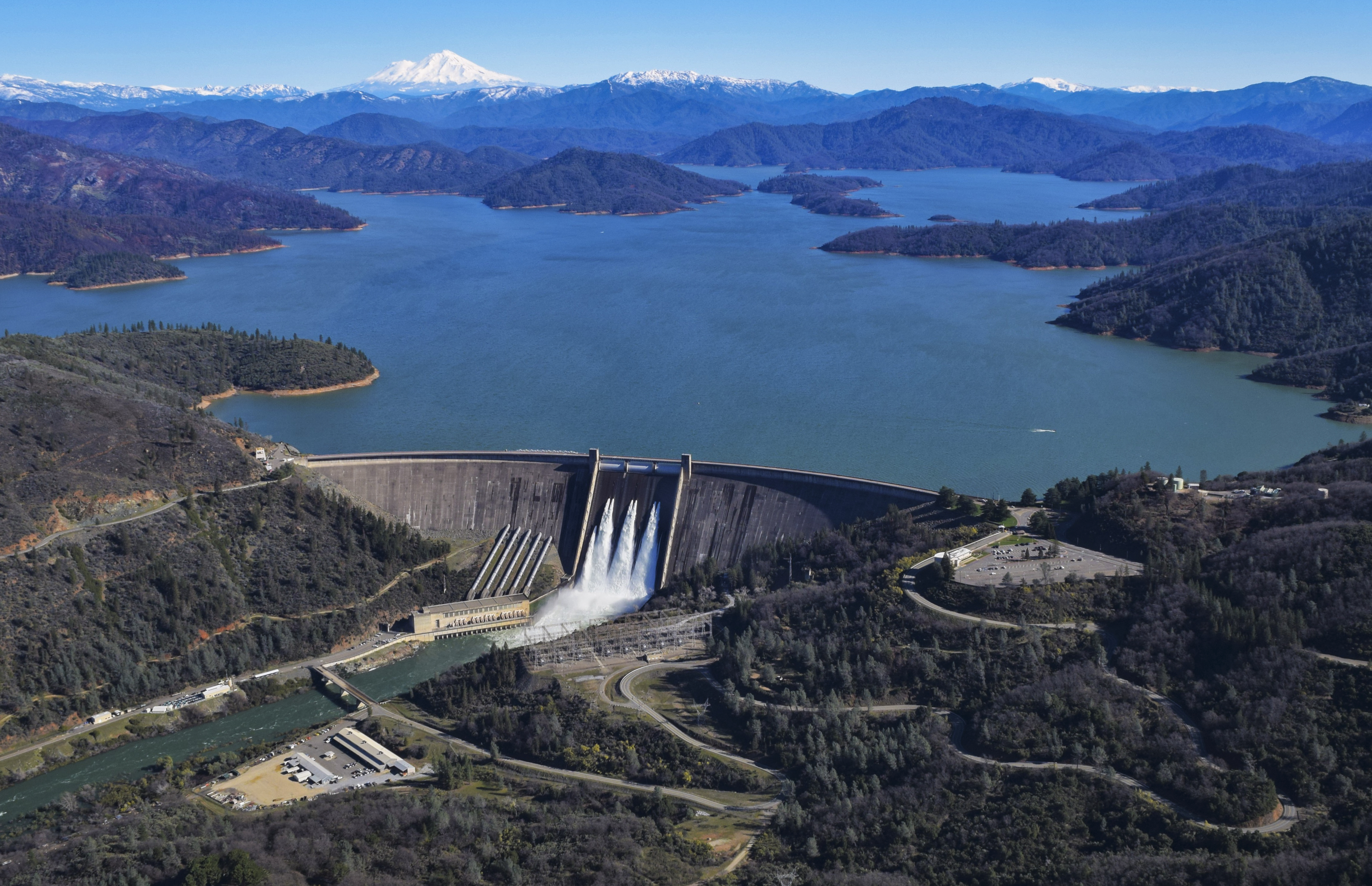
Lake Shasta, in the Shasta Cascade region, is California's largest reservoir.

California's interconnected water system is the world's largest, managing over 40,000,000 acre-feet (49 km^{3}) of water per year, centered on six main systems of aqueducts and infrastructure projects. Water use and conservation in California is a politically divisive issue, as the state experiences periodic droughts and has to balance the demands of its large agricultural and urban sectors, especially in the arid southern portion of the state. The state's widespread redistribution of water also invites the frequent scorn of environmentalists.

The California Water Wars, a conflict between Los Angeles and the Owens Valley over water rights, is one of the most well-known examples of the struggle to secure adequate water supplies. Former California Governor Arnold Schwarzenegger said:

We've been in crisis for quite some time because we're now 38 million people and not anymore 18 million people like we were in the late 60s. So it developed into a battle between environmentalists and farmers and between the south and the north and between rural and urban. And everyone has been fighting for the last four decades about water.

== Government and politics ==
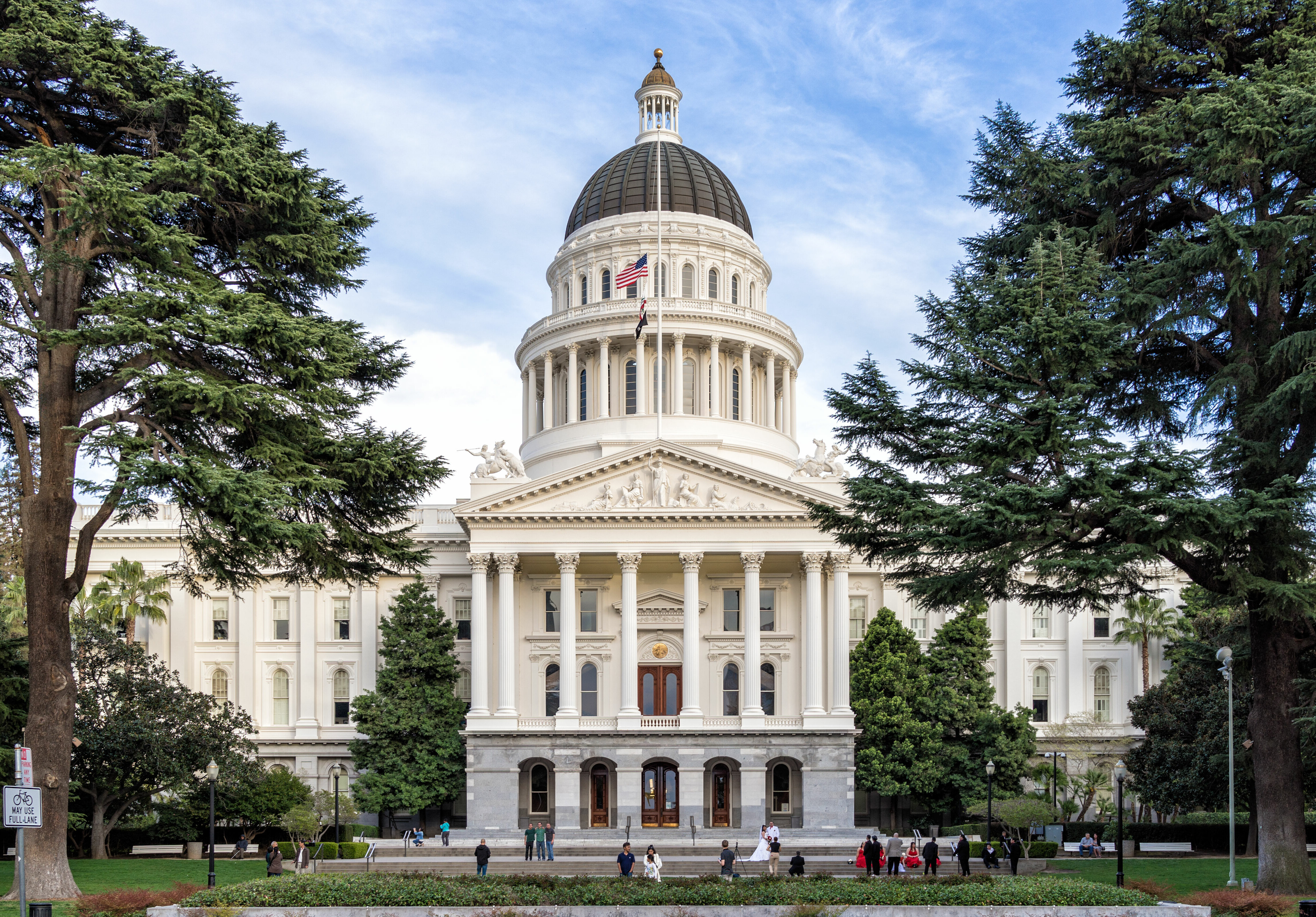
The California Capitol in Sacramento, seat of the California government, hosts the California Legislature and the Governor of California.

=== State government ===
The capital city of California is Sacramento. The state is organized into three branches of government: the executive branch consisting of the governor and the other independently elected constitutional officers; the legislative branch consisting of the Assembly and Senate; and the judicial branch consisting of the Supreme Court of California and lower courts. The state also allows ballot propositions: direct participation of the electorate by initiative, referendum, recall, and ratification. Before the passage of Proposition 14 in 2010, California allowed each political party to choose whether to have a closed primary or a primary where only party members and independents vote. After June 8, 2010, when Proposition 14 was approved, excepting only the U.S. president and county central committee offices, all candidates in the primary elections are listed on the ballot with their preferred party affiliation, but they are not the official nominee of that party. At the primary election, the two candidates with the top votes will advance to the general election regardless of party affiliation. This is known as a nonpartisan blanket primary. If at a special primary election, one candidate receives more than 50% of all the votes cast, they are elected to fill the vacancy and no special general election will be held.

==== Executive branch ====
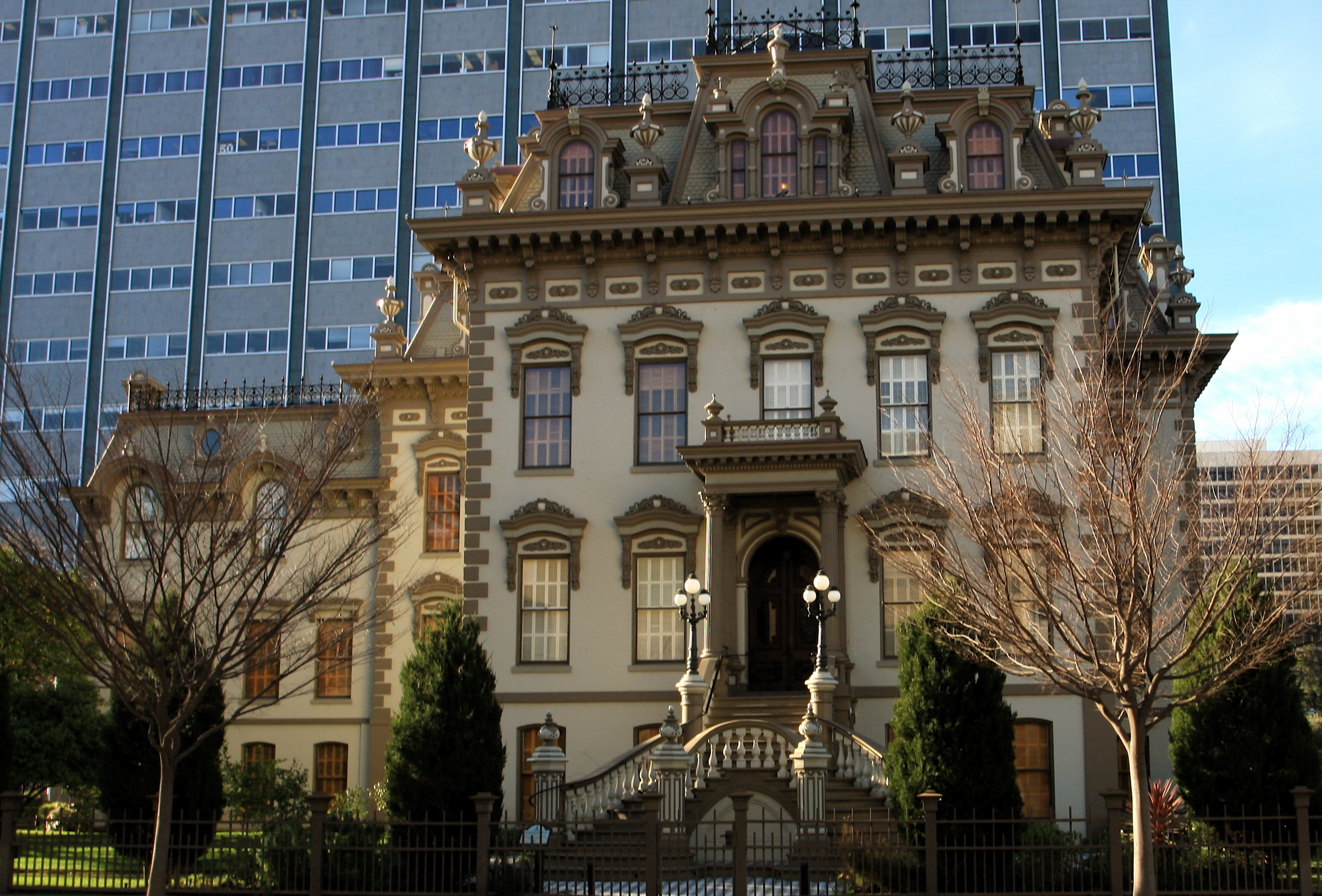
The Stanford Mansion is the official reception center for the California government, as well as one of the workplaces of the governor.

The California executive branch consists of the governor and seven other elected constitutional officers: lieutenant governor, attorney general, secretary of state, state controller, state treasurer, insurance commissioner, and state superintendent of public instruction. They serve four-year terms and may be re-elected only once.

The many California state agencies that are under the governor's cabinet are grouped together to form cabinet-level entities that are referred to by government officials as "superagencies". Those departments that are directly under the other independently elected officers work separately from these superagencies.

==== Legislative branch ====
The California State Legislature consists of a 40-member Senate and 80-member Assembly. Senators serve four-year terms and Assembly members two. Members of the Assembly are subject to term limits of six terms, and members of the Senate are subject to term limits of three terms.

==== Judicial branch ====
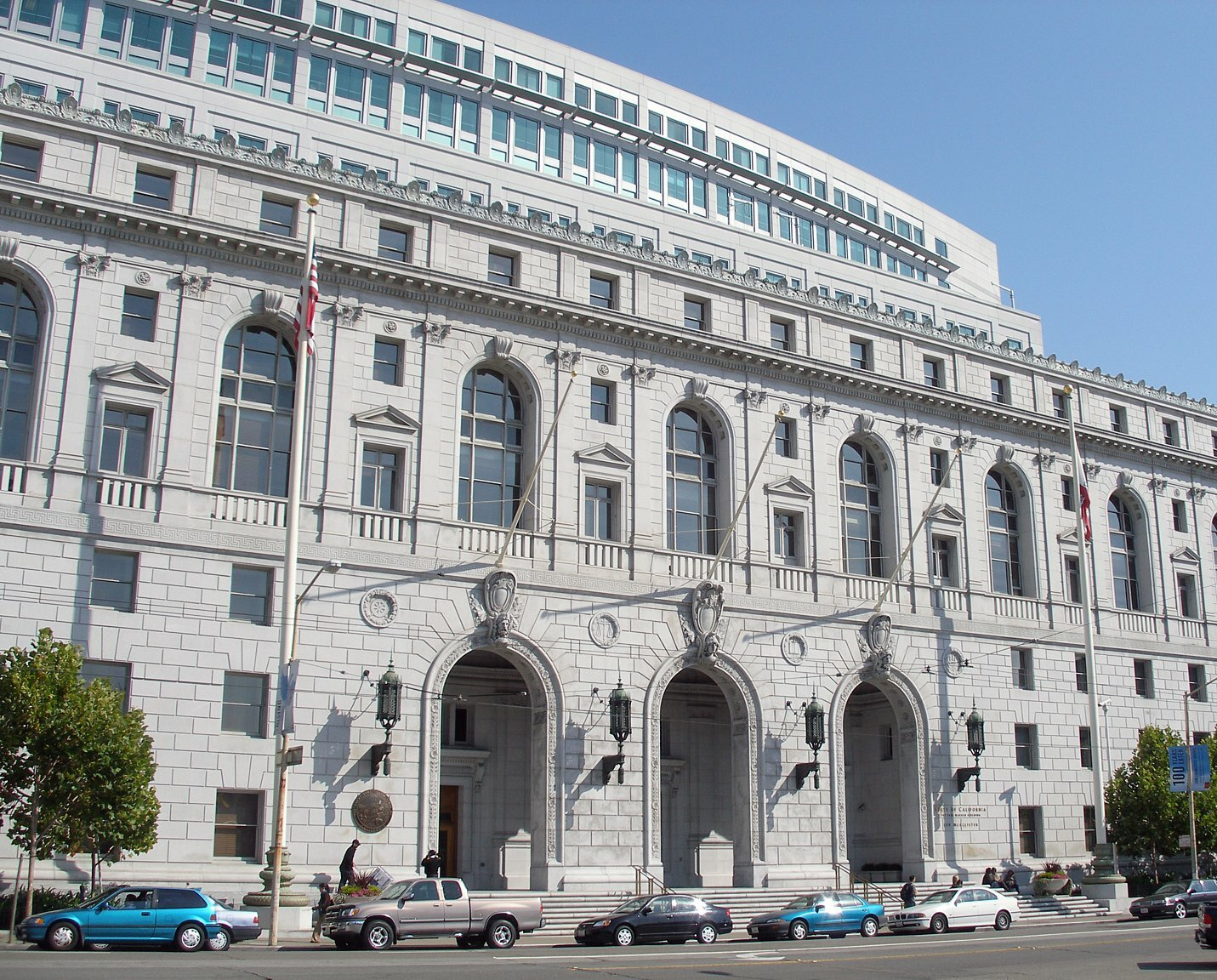
The Supreme Court of California primarily convenes at the Earl Warren Building in San Francisco (pictured), but also holds session in Sacramento and Los Angeles.

California's legal system is explicitly based upon English common law but carries many features from Spanish civil law, such as community property. California's prison population grew from 25,000 in 1980 to over 170,000 in 2007. Capital punishment is a legal form of punishment and the state has the largest "Death Row" population in the country (though Oklahoma and Texas are far more active in carrying out executions). California has performed 13 executions since 1976, with the last being in 2006.

California's judiciary system is the largest in the U.S. with a total of 1,600 judges (the federal system has only about 840). At the apex is the seven-member Supreme Court of California, while the California Courts of Appeal serve as the primary appellate courts and the California Superior Courts serve as the primary trial courts. Justices of the Supreme Court and Courts of Appeal are appointed by the governor, but are subject to retention by the electorate every 12 years.

The administration of the state's court system is controlled by the Judicial Council, composed of the chief justice of the California Supreme Court, 14 judicial officers, four representatives from the State Bar of California, and one member from each house of the state legislature.

In fiscal year 2020–2021, the state judiciary's 2,000 judicial officers and 18,000 judicial branch employees processed approximately 4.4 million cases.

=== Local government ===
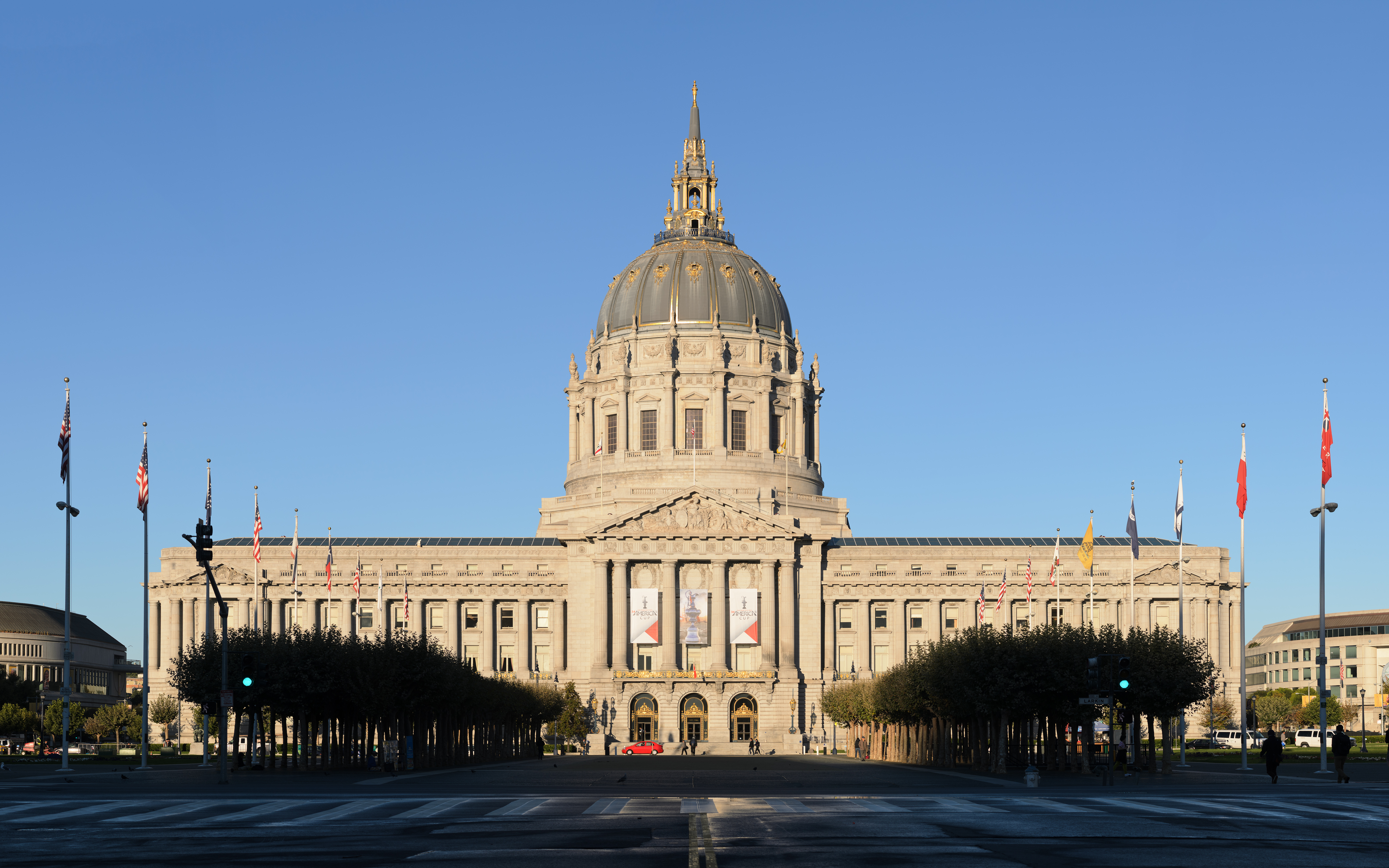
San Francisco City Hall is the seat of government of the consolidated City and County of San Francisco.

California has an extensive system of local government that manages public functions throughout the state. Like most states, California is divided into counties, of which there are 58 (including San Francisco) covering the entire state. Most urbanized areas are incorporated as cities. School districts, which are independent of cities and counties, handle public education. Many other functions, such as fire protection and water supply, especially in unincorporated areas, are handled by special districts.

==== Counties ====
Map of counties and municipalities in California

California is divided into 58 counties. Per Article 11, Section 1, of the Constitution of California, they are the legal subdivisions of the state. The county government provides countywide services such as law enforcement, jails, elections and voter registration, vital records, property assessment and records, tax collection, public health, health care, social services, libraries, flood control, fire protection, animal control, agricultural regulations, building inspections, ambulance services, and education departments in charge of maintaining statewide standards. In addition, the county serves as the local government for all unincorporated areas. Each county is governed by an elected board of supervisors.

==== City and town governments ====
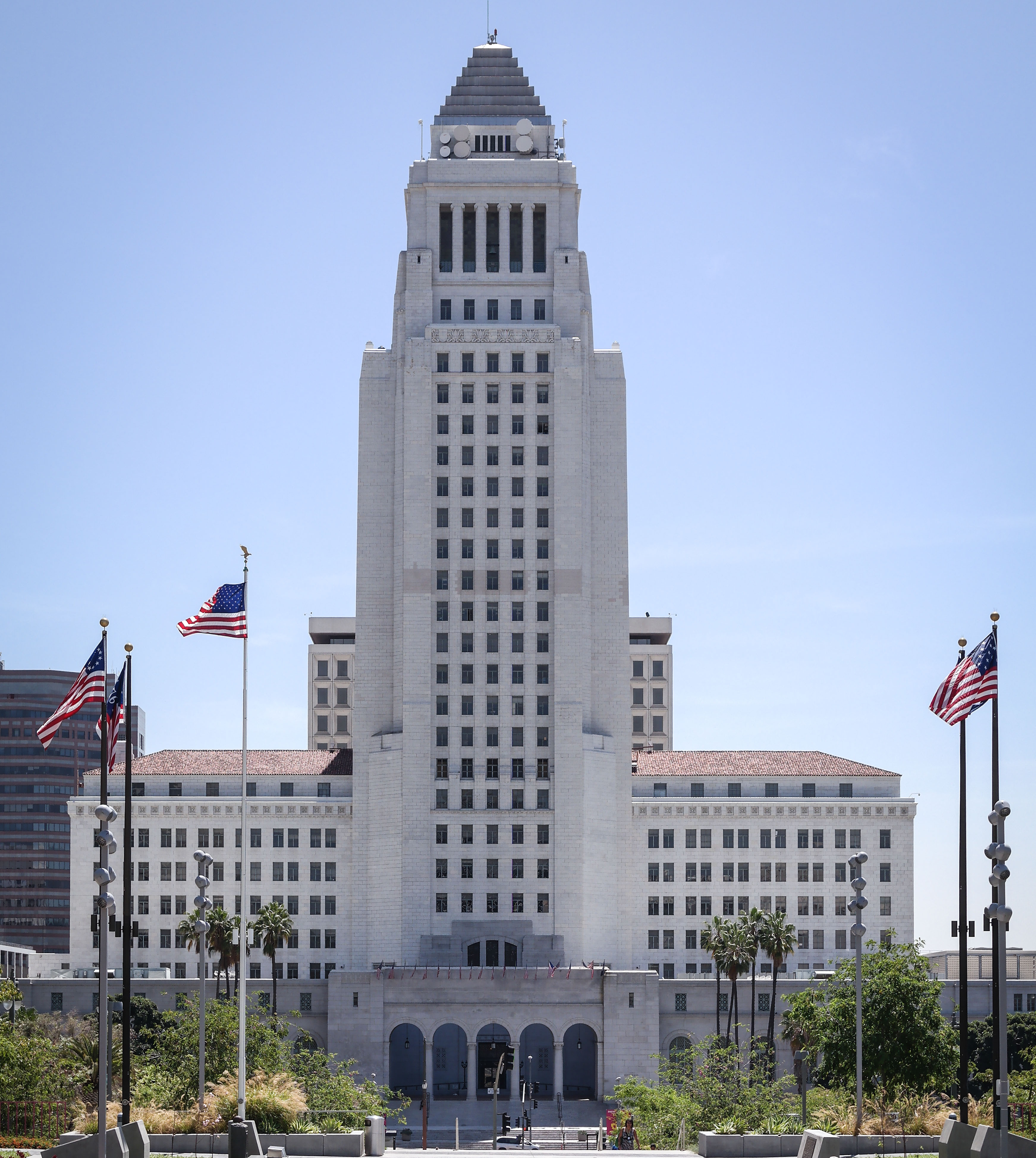
Los Angeles City Hall, seat of the Government of Los Angeles

Incorporated cities and towns in California are either charter or general-law municipalities. General-law municipalities owe their existence to state law and are consequently governed by it; charter municipalities are governed by their own city or town charters. Municipalities incorporated in the 19th century tend to be charter municipalities. All ten of the state's most populous cities are charter cities. Most small cities have a council–manager form of government, where the elected city council appoints a city manager to supervise the operations of the city. Some larger cities have a directly elected mayor who oversees the city government. In many council-manager cities, the city council selects one of its members as a mayor, sometimes rotating through the council membership—but this type of mayoral position is primarily ceremonial. The Government of San Francisco is the only consolidated city-county in California, where both the city and county governments have been merged into one unified jurisdiction.

==== School districts and special districts ====
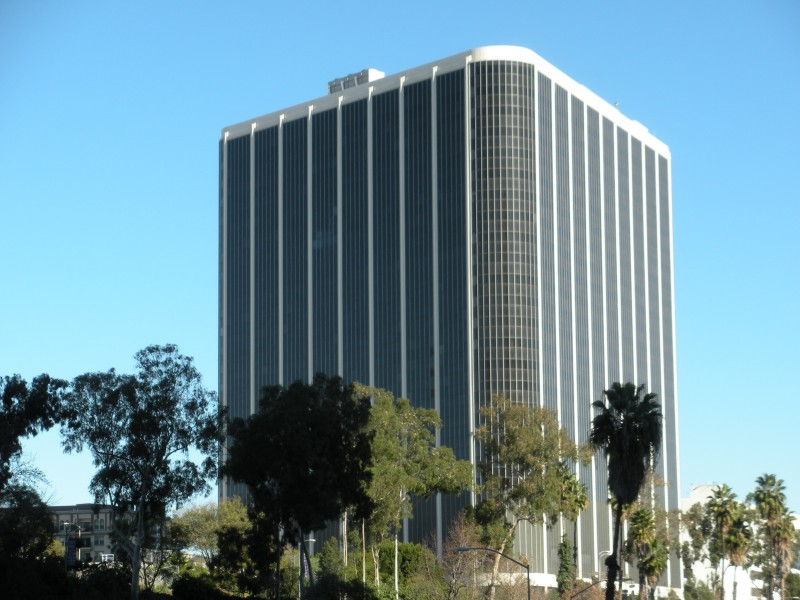
The Los Angeles Unified School District is the second largest in the U.S. by enrollment.

About 1,102 school districts, independent of cities and counties, handle California's public education. California school districts may be organized as elementary districts, high school districts, unified school districts combining elementary and high school grades, or community college districts.

There are about 3,400 special districts in California. A special district, defined by California Government Code § 16271(d) as "any agency of the state for the local performance of governmental or proprietary functions within limited boundaries", provides a limited range of services within a defined geographic area. The geographic area of a special district can spread across multiple cities or counties, or could consist of only a portion of one. Most of California's special districts are single-purpose districts, and provide one service.

=== Federal representation ===
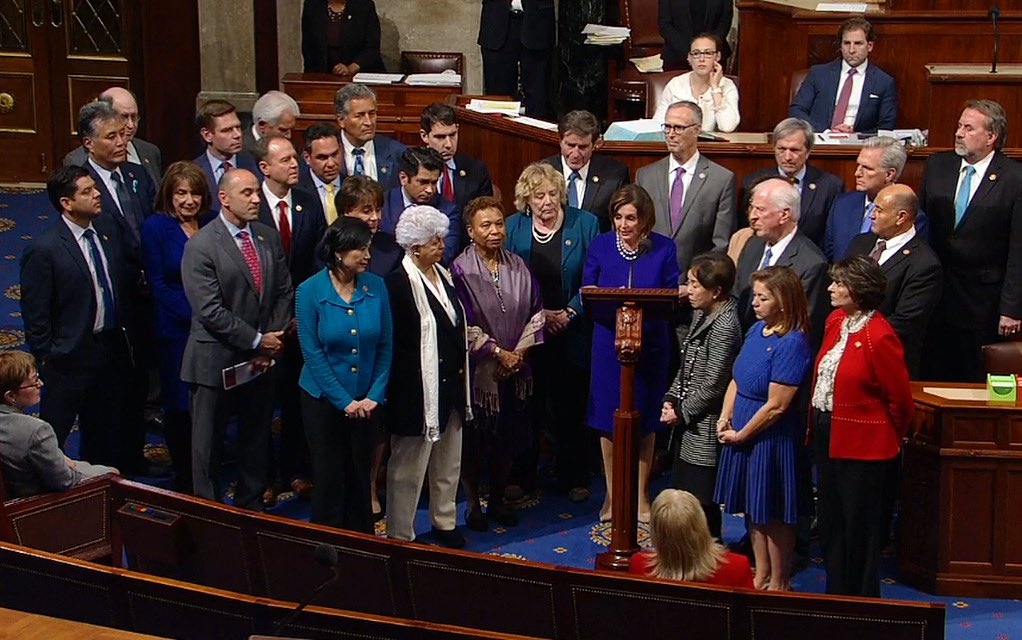
Members of the California congressional delegation in 2020

The state of California sends 52 members to the House of Representatives, the nation's largest congressional state delegation. Consequently, California also has the largest number of electoral votes in national presidential elections, with 54. The former speaker of the House of Representatives is the representative of California's 20th district, Kevin McCarthy.

California is represented in the U.S. Senate by Alex Padilla and Adam Schiff.

In response to the 2025 Texas redistricting, Governor Newsom secured legislative approval of California Proposition 50 in August 2025, which would redraw the state's congressional districts. The proposition was approved by 64.4% of voters, adding as many as five seats for the Democratic Party for the 2026 midterms.

=== Armed forces ===
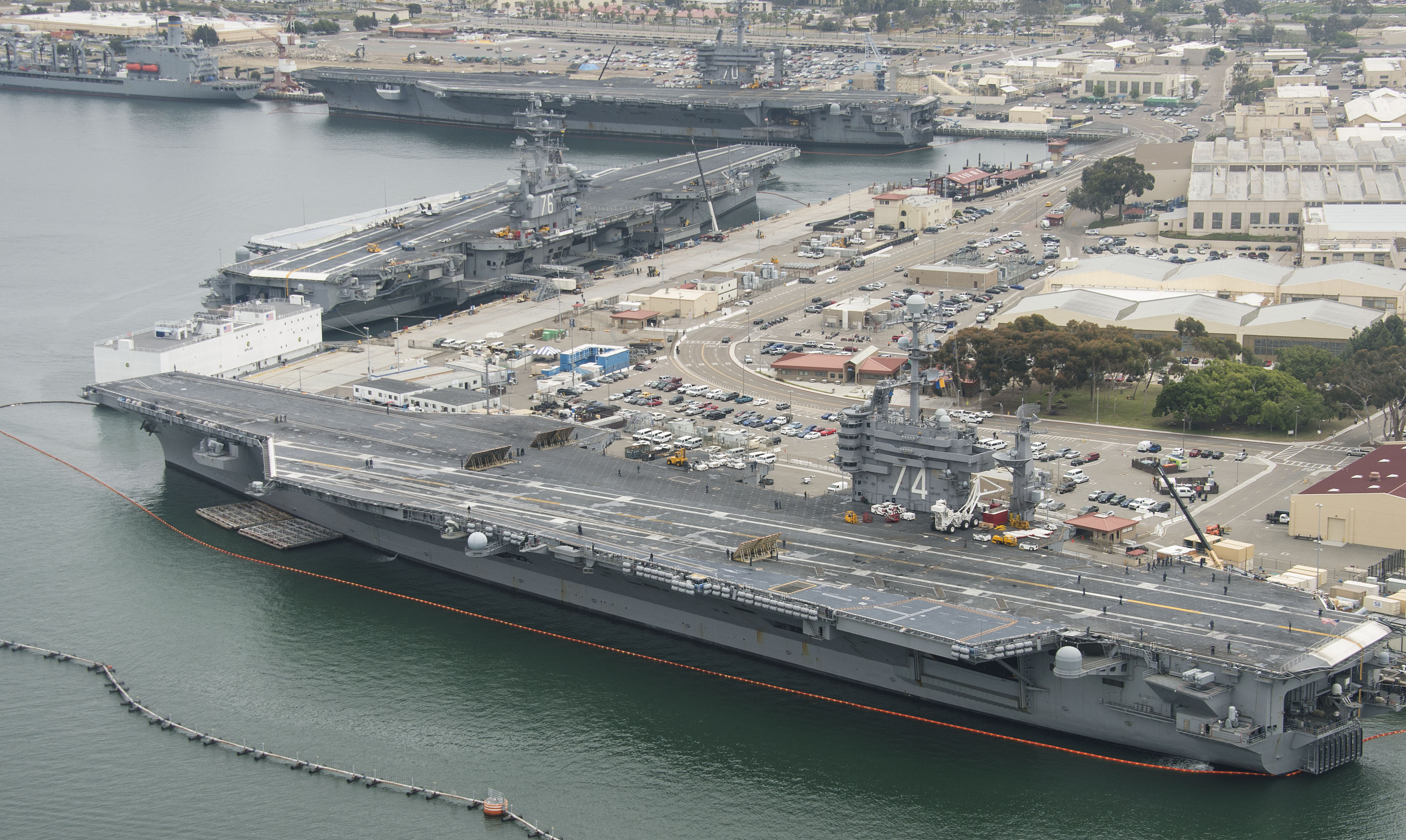
View of NAS North Island at Naval Base Coronado in San Diego

In California, as of 2009, the U.S. Department of Defense had a total of 117,806 active duty servicemembers of which 88,370 were Sailors or Marines, 18,339 were Airmen, and 11,097 were Soldiers, with 61,365 Department of Defense civilian employees. Additionally, there were a total of 57,792 Reservists and Guardsman in California.

In 2010, Los Angeles County was the largest origin of military recruits in the U.S. by county, with 1,437 individuals enlisting in the military. However, as of 2002, Californians were relatively under-represented in the military as a proportion to its population.

In 2000, California, had 2,569,340 veterans of U.S. military service. As of 2010, there were 1,942,775 veterans living in California, of which 1,457,875 served during a period of armed conflict, and just over four thousand served before World War II (the largest population of this group of any state).

California's military forces consist of the Army and Air National Guard, the naval and state military reserve (militia), and the California Cadet Corps.

=== Politics ===
California registered voters as of December 30, 2025
Party	Number of voters	Percentage	Party registration by county (October 2022): Democrat ≥ 30% Democrat ≥ 40% Democrat ≥ 50% Republican ≥ 30% Republican ≥ 40% Republican ≥ 50%
Democratic	10,381,340	44.96%	Party registration by county (October 2022): Democrat ≥ 30% Democrat ≥ 40% Democrat ≥ 50% Republican ≥ 30% Republican ≥ 40% Republican ≥ 50%
Republican	5,804,699	25.14%	Party registration by county (October 2022): Democrat ≥ 30% Democrat ≥ 40% Democrat ≥ 50% Republican ≥ 30% Republican ≥ 40% Republican ≥ 50%
No Party Preference	5,231,189	22.65%	Party registration by county (October 2022): Democrat ≥ 30% Democrat ≥ 40% Democrat ≥ 50% Republican ≥ 30% Republican ≥ 40% Republican ≥ 50%
American Independent	946,165	4.10%	Party registration by county (October 2022): Democrat ≥ 30% Democrat ≥ 40% Democrat ≥ 50% Republican ≥ 30% Republican ≥ 40% Republican ≥ 50%
Libertarian	231,683	1.00%	Party registration by county (October 2022): Democrat ≥ 30% Democrat ≥ 40% Democrat ≥ 50% Republican ≥ 30% Republican ≥ 40% Republican ≥ 50%
Peace and Freedom	149,397	0.65%	Party registration by county (October 2022): Democrat ≥ 30% Democrat ≥ 40% Democrat ≥ 50% Republican ≥ 30% Republican ≥ 40% Republican ≥ 50%
Green	112,704	0.49%	Party registration by county (October 2022): Democrat ≥ 30% Democrat ≥ 40% Democrat ≥ 50% Republican ≥ 30% Republican ≥ 40% Republican ≥ 50%
Other	234.921	1.02%	Party registration by county (October 2022): Democrat ≥ 30% Democrat ≥ 40% Democrat ≥ 50% Republican ≥ 30% Republican ≥ 40% Republican ≥ 50%
Total	23,092,098	100%	Party registration by county (October 2022): Democrat ≥ 30% Democrat ≥ 40% Democrat ≥ 50% Republican ≥ 30% Republican ≥ 40% Republican ≥ 50%

California has an idiosyncratic political culture compared to the rest of the country, and is sometimes regarded as a trendsetter. In socio-cultural mores and national politics, Californians are perceived as more liberal than other Americans, especially those who live in the inland states. In the 2016 U.S. presidential election, California had the third highest percentage of Democratic votes behind the District of Columbia and Hawaii. In the 2020 U.S. presidential election, it had the 6th highest behind D.C., Vermont, Massachusetts, Maryland, and Hawaii. According to the Cook Political Report, California contains five of the 15 most Democratic congressional districts in the U.S.

California was the second state to recall their state governor, the second state to legalize abortion, and the only state to ban marriage for gay couples twice by vote (including Proposition 8 in 2008). Voters also passed Proposition 71 in 2004 to fund stem cell research, making California the second state to legalize stem cell research, and Proposition 14 in 2010 to completely change the state's primary election process. California has also experienced disputes over water rights; and a tax revolt, culminating with the passage of Proposition 13 in 1978, limiting state property taxes. California voters have rejected affirmative action on multiple occasions, most recently in November 2020.

The state's trend towards the Democratic Party and away from the Republican Party can be seen in state elections. From 1899 to 1939, California had exclusively Republican governors. Since 1990, California has generally elected Democratic candidates to federal, state and local offices, including current Governor Gavin Newsom; however, the state has elected Republican Governors, though many of its Republican Governors, such as Arnold Schwarzenegger, tend to be considered moderate Republicans and more centrist than the national party.

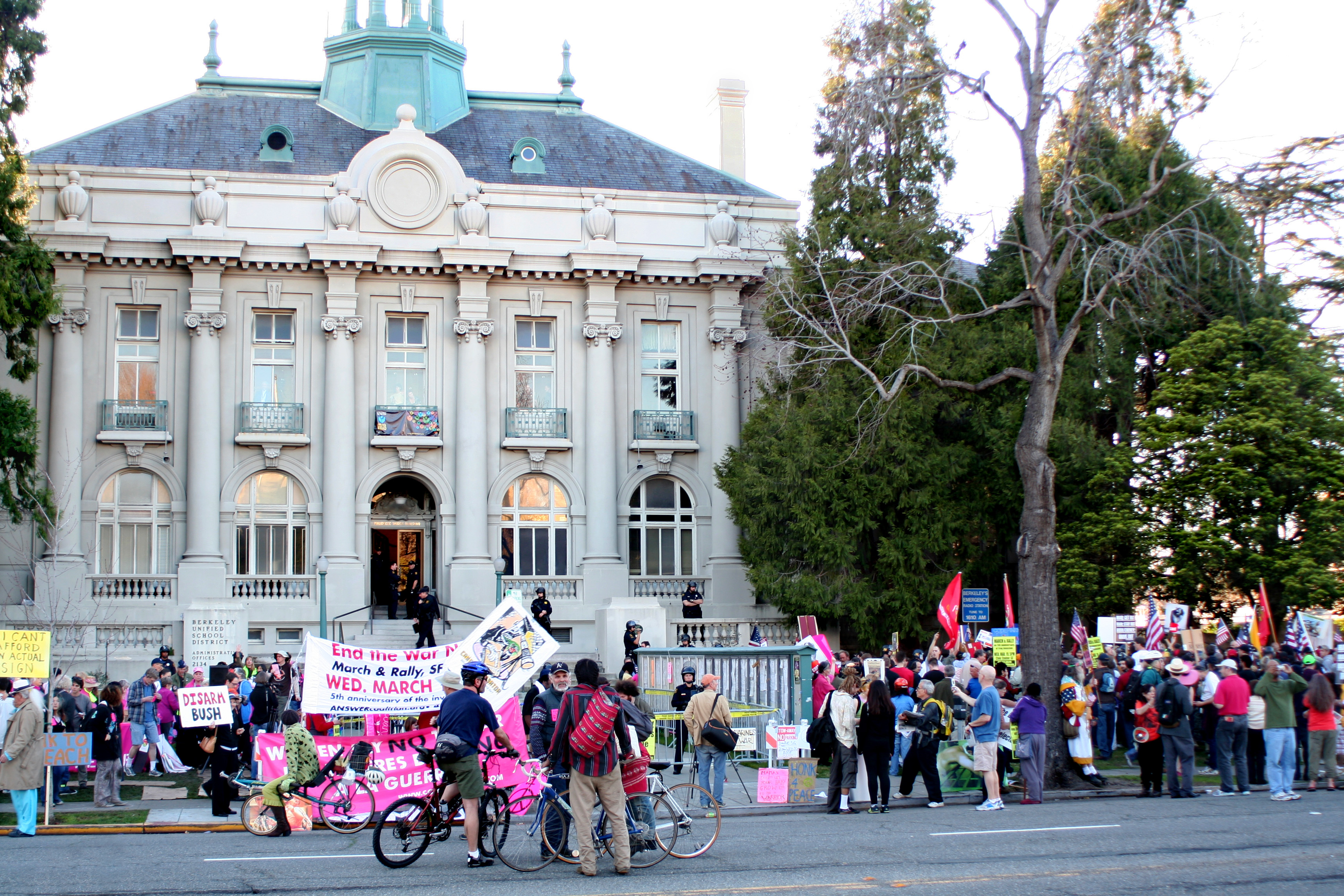
Anti-war protesters and pro-military counterprotesters in Berkeley (2008)

Several political movements have advocated for California independence. The California National Party and the California Freedom Coalition both advocate for California independence along the lines of progressivism and civic nationalism. The Yes California movement attempted to organize an independence referendum via ballot initiative for 2019, which was then postponed.

The Democrats also hold a supermajority in both houses of the state legislature. There are 62 Democrats and 18 Republicans in the Assembly; and 32 Democrats and eight Republicans in the Senate.

From 1952 through 1988, California was a Republican-leaning state, as the party carried the state's electoral votes in nine of ten elections, with 1964 as the sole exception. Southern California Republicans Richard Nixon and Ronald Reagan were both elected twice as the 37th and 40th U.S. Presidents, respectively. However, Democrats have won all of California's electoral votes for the last eight elections, starting in 1992.

In the U.S. House, the Democrats held a 34–19 edge in the California delegation of the 110th U.S. Congress in 2007. As the result of gerrymandering, the districts in California were usually dominated by one or the other party, and few districts were considered competitive. In 2008, Californians passed Proposition 20 to empower a 14-member independent citizen commission to redraw districts for both local politicians and Congress. After the 2012 elections, when the new system took effect, Democrats gained four seats and held a 38–15 majority in the delegation. Following the 2018 midterm House elections, Democrats won 46 out of 53 congressional house seats in California, leaving Republicans with seven.

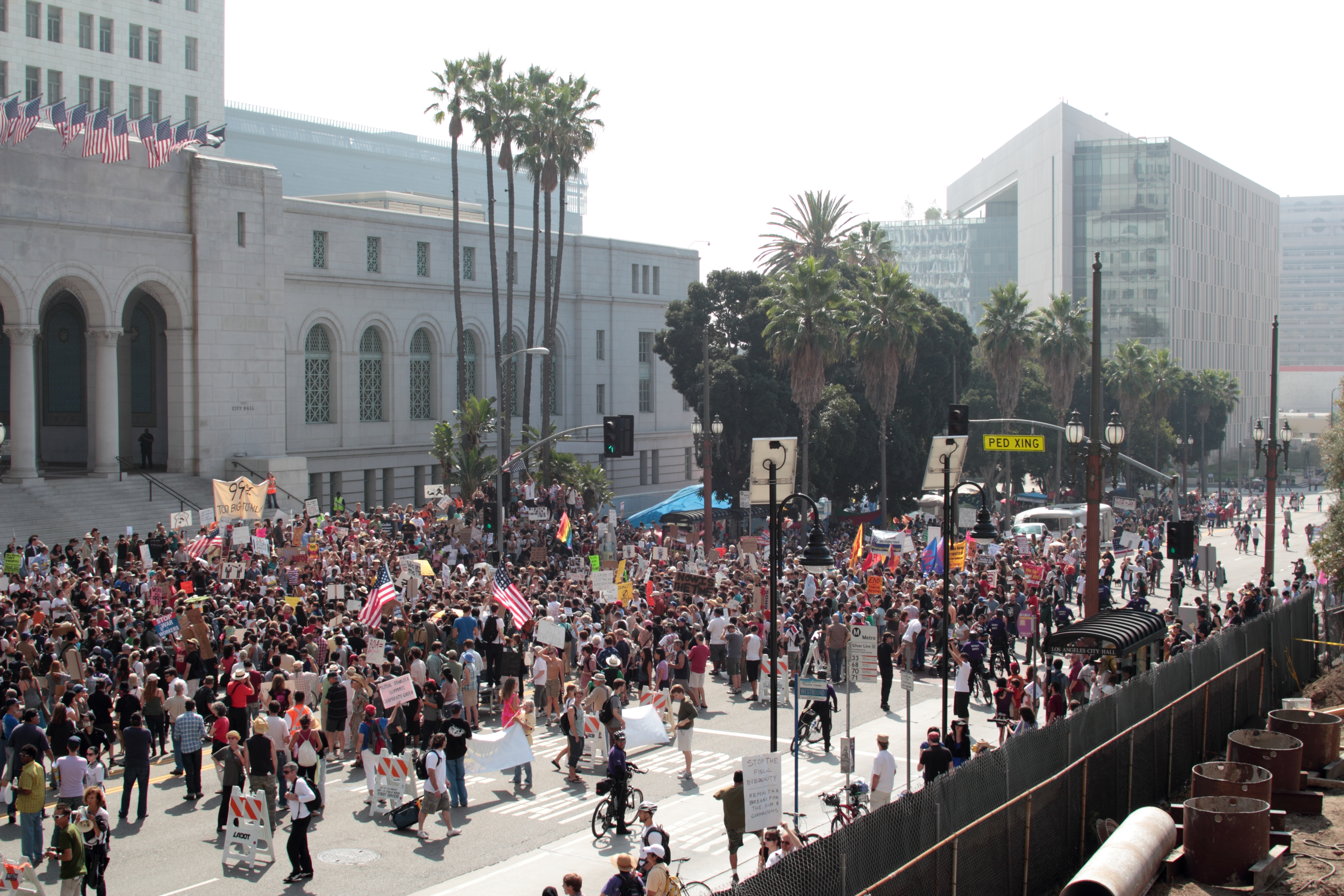
Occupy Los Angeles movement (2011)

In general, Democratic strength is centered in the populous coastal regions of the Los Angeles metropolitan area and the San Francisco Bay Area. Republican strength is still greatest in eastern parts of the state. Orange County had remained largely Republican until the 2016 and 2018 elections, in which a majority of the county's votes were cast for Democratic candidates. One study ranked Berkeley, Oakland, Inglewood and San Francisco in the top 20 most liberal American cities; and Bakersfield, Orange, Escondido, Garden Grove, and Simi Valley in the top 20 most conservative cities.

In October 2022, out of the 26,876,800 people eligible to vote, 21,940,274 people were registered to vote. Of the people registered, the three largest registered groups were Democrats (10,283,258), Republicans (5,232,094), and No Party Preference (4,943,696).

California retains the death penalty, though it has not been used since 2006.

=== Foreign relations ===
California is a member of the Commission of the Californias, a tri-lateral forum for cooperation between the U.S. state of California and the Mexican states of Baja California and Baja California Sur.

Twinned regions

California has region twinning arrangements with:

- Catalonia, autonomous community of Spain
- Alberta, province of Canada
- Jeju Province of South Korea
- Guangdong, province of China

== See also ==
- Index of California-related articles
- Outline of California
- List of people from California

== Notes ==
Preceded by Wisconsin	List of U.S. states by date of statehood Admitted on September 9, 1850 (31st)	Succeeded by Minnesota
