= Tehachapi Wind Resource Area =

Area of wind farms near Tehachapi Mountains, California

- Wind resource area
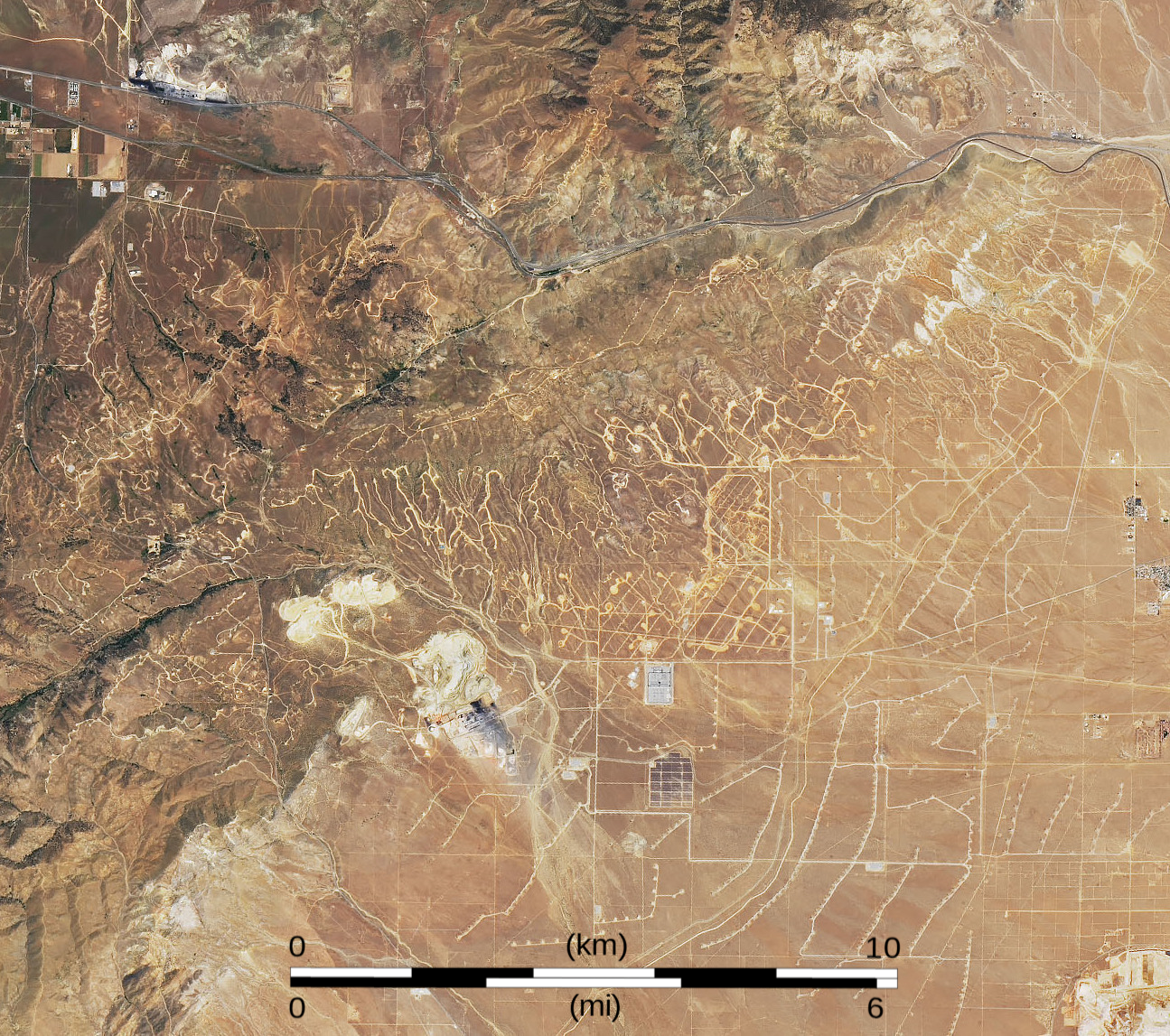
- Central part of Tehachapi Wind Resource Area from space

- Location within California
- Coordinates: 35°04′05″N 118°15′45″W
- Location: Kern County, California
- Range: Sierra Nevada, Tehachapi Mountains
- Part of: Antelope Valley, Indian Wells Valley, Tehachapi Pass

Area
  - Total: 800 mi^{2} (2,100 km^{2}) (approx.)

The Tehachapi Wind Resource Area (TWRA) is a large wind resource area along the foothills of the Sierra Nevada and Tehachapi Mountains in California. It is the largest wind resource area in California, encompassing an area of approximately 800 mi^{2} (2,100 km^{2}) and producing a combined 3,507 MW of renewable electricity between its 5 independent wind farms.

The mountain pass acts as a venturi effect to air moving between ocean and desert, increasing wind speed.

This area is a net exporter of generation to other parts of the state of California. A state initiative to upgrade the transmission out of Tehachapi (the 4.5 GW Tehachapi Renewable Transmission Project) began in 2008 and was completed by 2016. This has opened the door to further regional wind power development up to 10 GW, and multiple solar and storage projects are installed to utilize that capacity. A prime location for viewing the turbines is off of State Route 58 and from Tehachapi-Willow Springs Road.

== Wind farms ==
The Tehachapi Wind Resource Area is home to 5 independently owned and operated wind farms as of February 2020.

Name	Coordinates	Capacity (MW)	Year	Ref
Alta Wind Energy Center	35°1′16″N 118°19′14″W	1,548	2011	
Manzana Wind Farm	34°55′11″N 118°26′55″W	340.7	2013	
Pine Tree Wind Power Project	35°14′49″N 118°10′35″W	135	2009	
Sky River Wind Farm	35°20′42″N 118°11′09″W	239	1994	
Tehachapi Pass Wind Farm	35°04′05″N 118°15′45″W	1,244	1986	

== Tehachapi Renewable Transmission Project ==
The development of the Tehachapi Wind Resource Area began in 2009 in conjunction with the development of the Tehachapi Renewable Transmission Project. The transmission project was required to support new wind developments in the area at the time including Alta-Oak Creek Mojave Project which was part of Alta Wind Energy Center, the largest wind farm in the world as of 2013.

== See also ==
- Wind farms in California
- List of onshore wind farms
