= John Eckland =

John Ellis Eckland (born 1942) is a former CIA Alternative Energy Analyst, and pioneer of early renewable energy efforts during the 1970s and 1980s. He was the founder and president of the now-defunct Fayette Manufacturing Corporation, a Fortune 500 company. In 1979, he received the Arthur S. Flemming Award for Excellence in Government Service, becoming the first CIA member to be honored with this recognition. Eckland earned a degree in economics from Tulane University. He joined the CIA as an alternative energy analyst, eventually resigning to establish the first commercial wind farm in the United States on the Altamont Pass in central California.

== Early life and personal life ==
John was the second of three sons of Stockton natives; Ellis E. Eckland, an engineer and Yardley Moore Eckland, artist. He was raised in the nearby farming community of Linden, and attended Linden High School, class of 1960. After being awarded the Bank of America scholarship prizes in Science and Mathematics, he attended Tulane University, earning a degree in economics. He has a Master's in Economics and started a doctoral program at the University of Florida but dropped out before completion. While attending Tulane, he met Susan H. Weinfield, a graduate student at the School of Social Work. After a brief courtship, they married February 21, 1965. They have three grown children: Ellis A. Eckland, Economist (1971-), Kristin L. Eckland, Nurse Practitioner, [Author] (b. 1974) and Thomas Eckland (b. 1976), who manages a small hotel. John and Susan Eckland currently divide their time between Nevada and British Columbia.

== Early career ==
John Eckland later joined the Central Intelligence Agency as an alternative energy analyst. During this time, he designed and built a 4,000-square-foot (370 m^{2}) home in the (at that time) rural D.C. suburb of Great Falls, Virginia. This home was equipped with prototype solar panels, and a small windmill as part of his interest in alternative energy sources (Mother Earth, 1981).

== Fayette Manufacturing Corporation ==
Following his formation of a small alternative energy company with a co-worker, Mr. Eckland resigned from federal service and temporarily relocated to central Pennsylvania.

Mr. Eckland later returned to central California where he established the first commercial wind farm in the United States. The first windmills were placed on the Altamont Pass on land leased from a local rancher, Joe Jess, Sr. The purpose of this project was to promote wind energy as a viable source of clean, renewable energy.

== Conflicts and controversies affect wind energy ==
=== Windmills and the media ===
When the first windfarms appeared in 1981, on the Altamont hills alongside the Altamont Pass portion of the I-580 freeway, the appearance of the modern windmill generated media excitement and public interest. This portion of the freeway was an increasingly used corridor for growing the bedroom communities of Tracy, Lodi and Modesto serving the Bay Area of California (Oakland, San Francisco and Pleasanton). Daily commuters crowded past the otherwise barren cattle ranches for several hours each day.

By 1985, the Altamont Pass was crowded with over 26 different windfarms. The increased visibility from the nearby I-580 freeway, which had once sparked the media and community's interest, was now widely regarded as a growing eyesore. Successful windfarms at the Altamont Pass encouraged the development of further industrial wind areas in southern California. These windfarms, in the Tehachapi Pass, led to wider recognition, after windmills played a role as a prominent backdrop in several feature films of the mid- and late 1980s including a 1985 film based on the Bret Easton Ellis novel Less than Zero, featuring Andrew McCarthy and Robert Downey, Jr.

=== Environmental concerns ===
Wind energy was initially considered to be a boon to environmentalists, as a source of clean, renewable energy. However, as wind energy became more prominent and visible in central California, several outspoken environmentalists made claims that windmills were damaging the local ecology. They reported that several thousands of birds, particularly several endangered species, were enticed into the turbine blades which then destroyed the birds. The debate on this issue remains heated, with one prominent researcher stating that more birds are killed by cars from the nearby freeway than turbines, and another activist labeling turbines as a "Cuisinart of death [for birds]". Research results are mixed, and widespread publicity on this issue has resulted in several wind companies being limited in their development and expansion of wind energy.

== Notes ==
- Kupfer, A. People to watch. June 24, 1985. Fortune magazine.

"John E. Eckland As the CIA's chief of energy research in the Seventies, Eckland wrote the reports that prompted Jimmy Carter to declare the moral equivalent of war on the energy crisis. Eckland, 43, is carrying on the battle in breezy Tracy, California, as president of Fayette Manufacturing Corp. (1984 revenues: $64 million), one of the country's leading windmill companies. Eckland is developing a new turbine that he says can support itself without the tax credits that have fueled sales so far. He also has high hopes for his worldwide patent on a technology that he says would allow conventional steam turbines to make their juice with only two-thirds the fuel now needed. Eckland expects to start building an $11-million demonstration plant this month." [Kupfer, A.]

- Arthur S. Flemming award recipients
- Peak Oil Pioneers
- The threat to wind energy, special report. (1985). Fisher, B. New York Times, October 26, 1985.
- Local self-reliance. Mother Earth News, Issue 70, July–August 1981.
- American Turbine Makers, 1975–1985. Winds of Change: Stories of a dawning wind power industry.
- Davidson, K. (2007). Cats, not windmills, bigger thread to birds. San Francisco Chronicle, May 4, 2009.
- Ritter, J. (2005). Wind turbines taking toll on birds of prey. USAToday, January 4, 2005.
- Wampler, S. (1982, March 9). < Windmills are growing along Altamont Hills. Lodi News-Sentinel.
- Fayette Manufacturing Patents for turbines, windmills: US4374631, Windmill speed limiting system utilizing hysteresis, 4715782, inventor: David Shimmel; Hydraulic control, 4915590 patent inventors: John Eckland and James Frerotte; rotor blade
