= Tehachapi Pass wind farm =

Wind farm in the United States

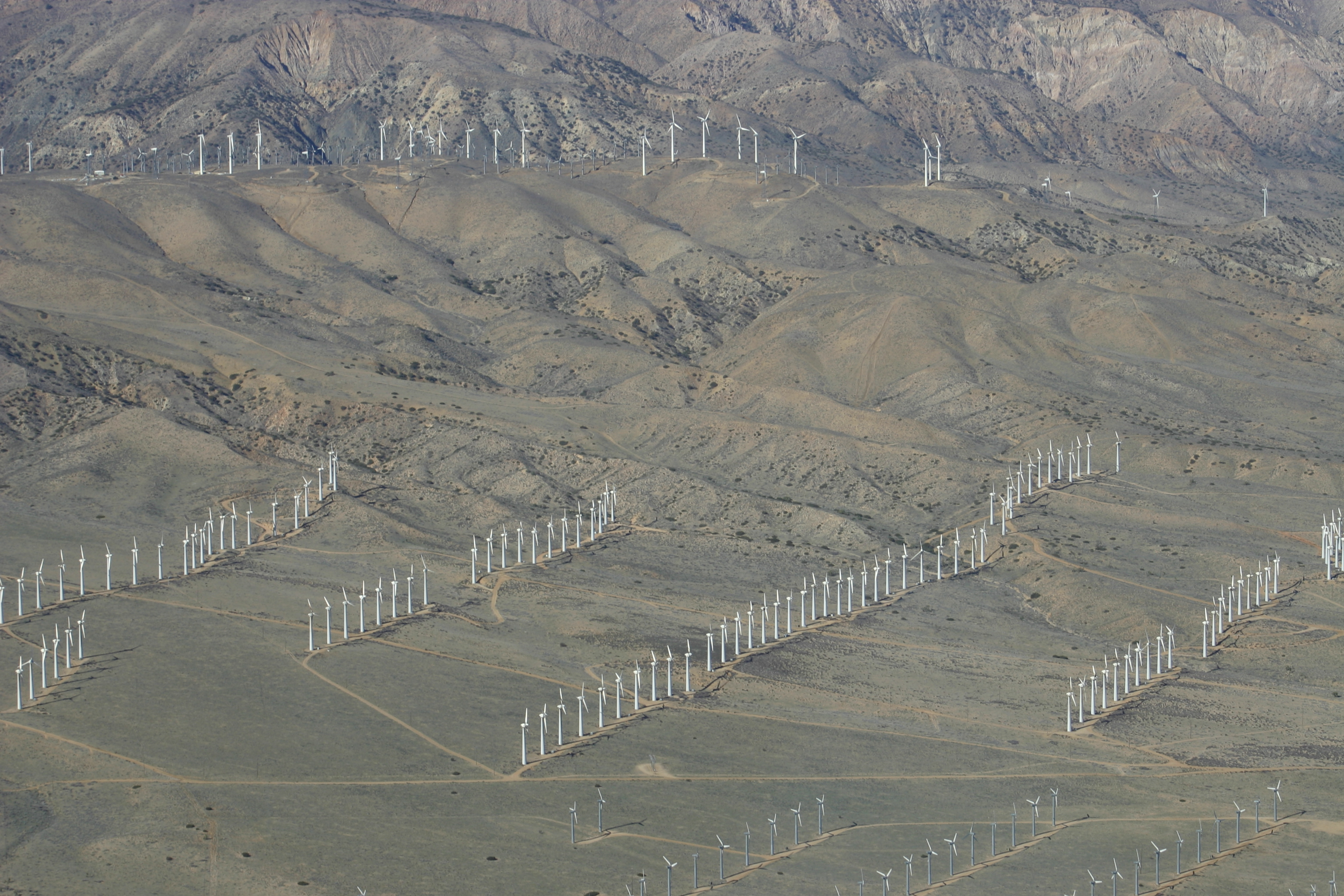
- Aerial view of the Tehachapi Pass wind farm
- Country: United States
- Location: Tehachapi Pass, Kern County, California
- Coordinates: 35°06′08″N 118°16′58″W
- Status: Operational
- Construction began: 1980s

Wind farm
- Type: Onshore
- Site area: 3200 acres

Power generation
- Nameplate capacity: 705 MW

External links
- Commons: Related media on Commons

The Tehachapi Pass wind farm is one of the first large-scale wind farms installed in the U.S., with around 710 megawatts (950,000 hp) produced by about 3400 wind turbines.

== Overview ==
The mountain pass acts as a venturi effect to air moving between ocean and desert, increasing wind speed.

Wind development in the Tehachapi Pass began in the early 1980s by James Dehlsen and Zond Corporation. The first set of wind turbines installed were of American-made Storm Master brand, however they proved troublesome and eventually had to be replaced. Dehlsen turned to Danish-built machines later, which now make up the majority of the turbines at the pass. The area hosts a multitude of wind farms, comprising one of California's largest wind resource areas. The pass is undergoing much repowering activity. The area has multiple generations of wind turbine technology installed, including both single and double-blade turbines, as well as the more modern three-blade horizontal axis design. The older generation turbines generate kilowatts, and the modern turbines installed generate up to 3 megawatts, depending on the specific turbine and manufacturer.

The Tehachapi Wind Resource Area is a net exporter of generation to other parts of the state of California. A state initiative to upgrade the transmission out of Tehachapi (the 4.5 GW Tehachapi Renewable Transmission Project) began in 2008 and was completed by 2016. This has opened the door to further regional wind power development up to 10 GW, and multiple solar and storage projects are expected to be installed to utilize that capacity. A prime location for viewing the turbines is off of State Route 58 and from Tehachapi-Willow Springs Road.

== Further development ==
One proponent for further regional wind power development is Southern California Edison, which executed power purchase agreements for up to 1,500 megawatts (MW) or more of power generated from new projects to be built in the Tehachapi area, of which the Alta Wind Energy Center was developed. The 2006 contract, which more than doubles SCE's wind energy portfolio, envisions more than 50 square miles (130 km^{2}) of wind parks in the Tehachapi region, which is triple the size of any existing U.S. wind farm.

Other well-known wind turbine locations in California include the adjacent Alta Wind Energy Center, the Altamont Pass Wind Farm and the San Gorgonio Pass Wind Farm, near Palm Springs.

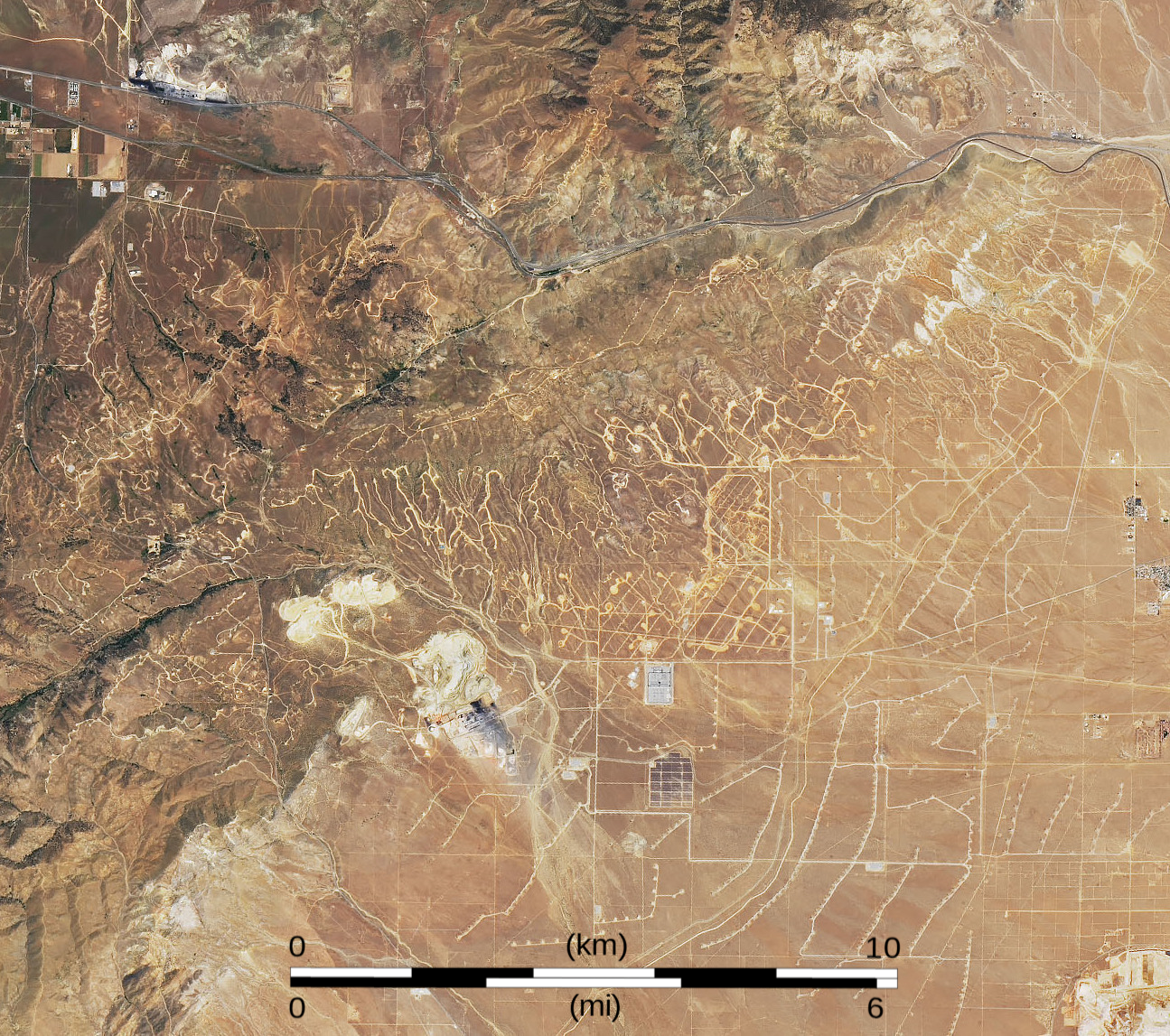
Tehachapi Pass wind farm and Alta Wind Energy Center from space, 2019

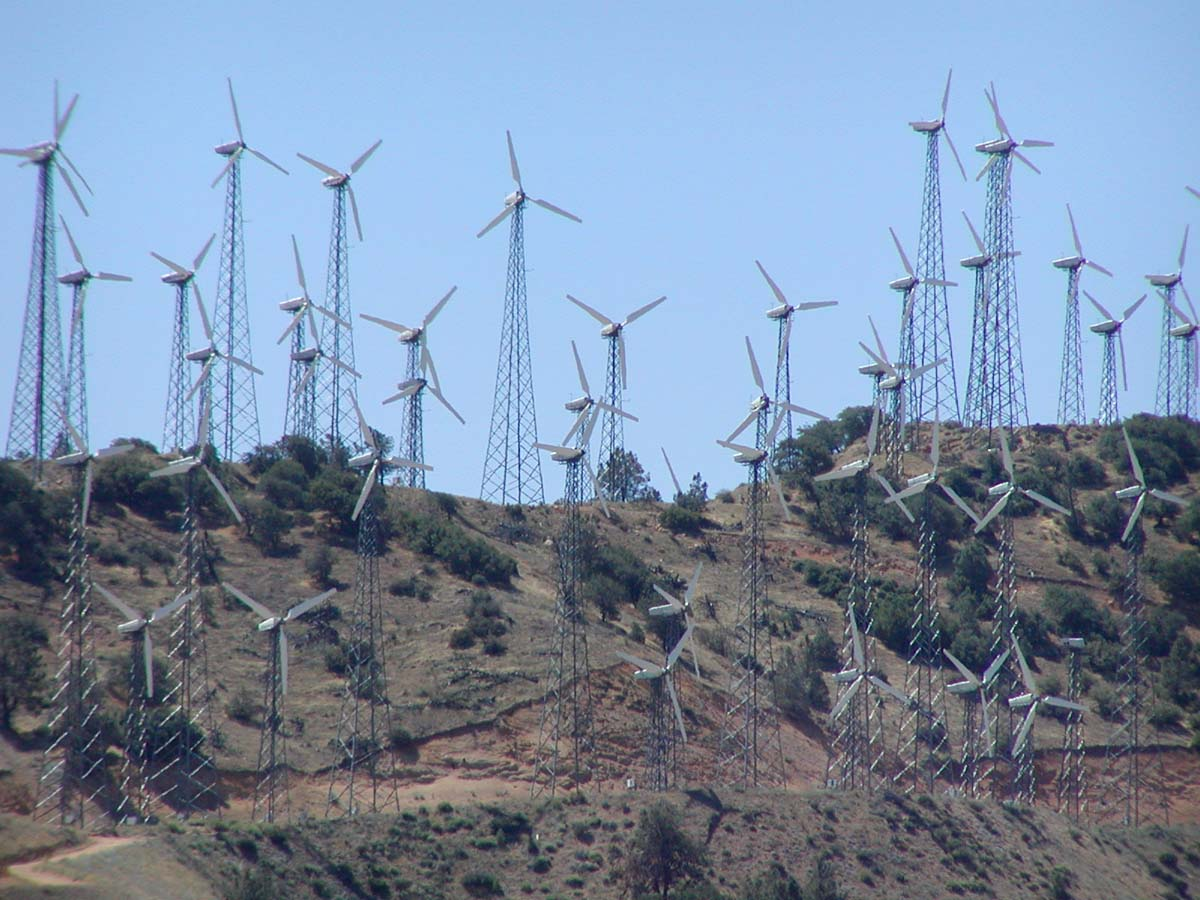
Tehachapi Pass wind turbines

== See also ==
- Tehachapi Wind Resource Area
- Wind power in the United States
- Wind power in California
