= San Gorgonio Pass wind farm =

Wind farm in California, United States

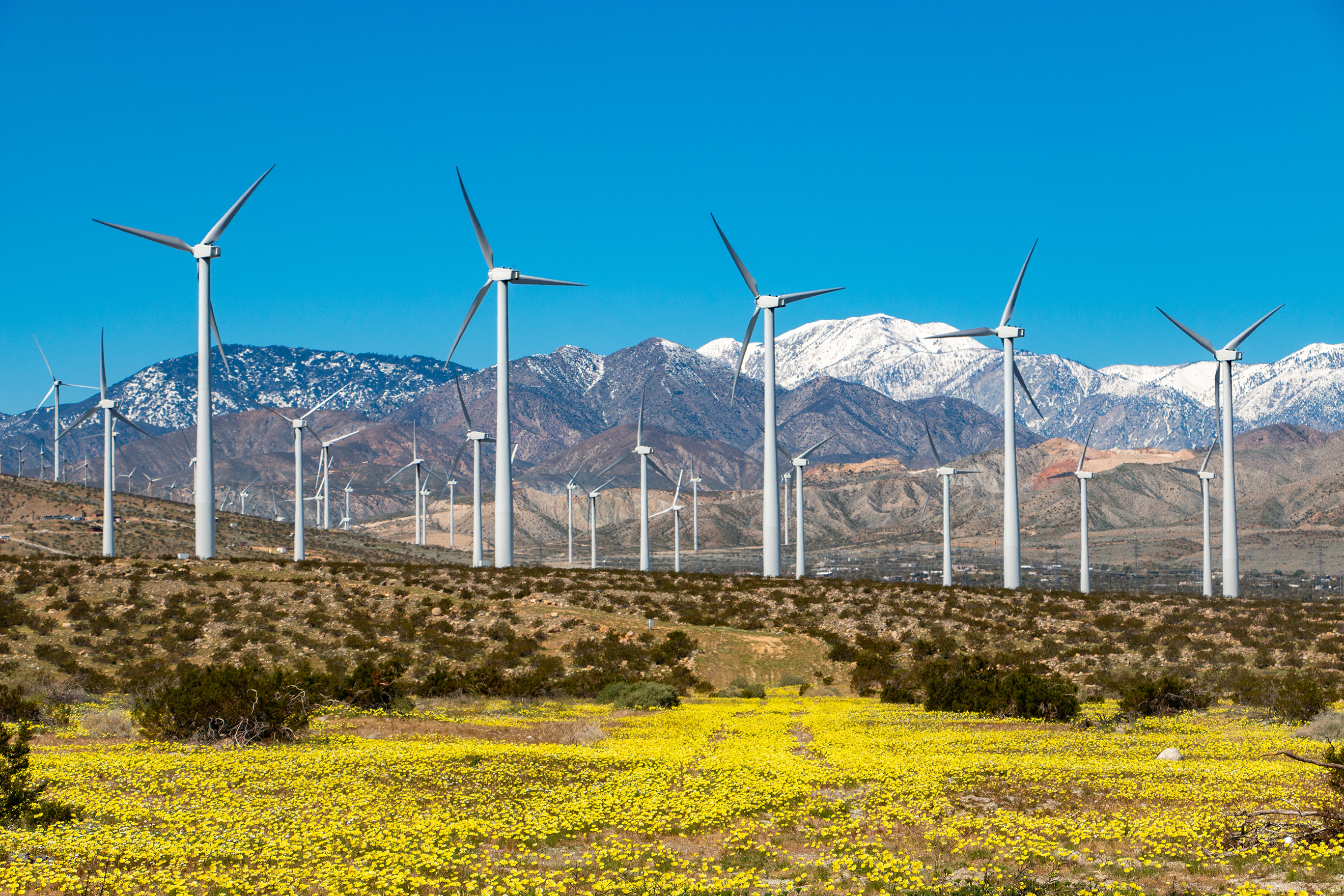
- The San Gorgonio Pass wind farm in March 2023
- Country: United States
- Location: Riverside County, California
- Coordinates: 33°54′N 116°35′W
- Status: Operational
- Construction began: 1982
- Owner: Various
- Operator: Various

Wind farm
- Type: Onshore
- Hub height: 300 ft (91 m) (max)

Power generation
- Units operational: 667
- Nameplate capacity: 628 MW

External links
- Commons: Related media on Commons

The San Gorgonio Pass wind farm is a wind farm that stretches from the eastern slope of the San Gorgonio Pass, near Cabazon, to North Palm Springs, on the western end of the Coachella Valley, in Riverside County, California. Flanked by Mount San Gorgonio and the Transverse Ranges to the North, and Mount San Jacinto and the Peninsular Ranges to the South, the San Gorgonio Pass is a transitional zone from a Mediterranean climate west of the pass, to a Desert climate east of the pass. This makes the pass area one of the most consistently windy places in the United States.

Development of the wind farm began in the 1980s. It is one of the first three major wind farm areas in California, along with those at Altamont and the Tehachapi passes.

As of May 2025, the wind farm consists of 667 wind turbines with a total rated capacity of 656 MW, built as part of 27 projects. The rated power output is somewhat understated, since the official database includes several unidentified turbines that are known to be in the 3-4 MW range. In December 2021 the site hosted more than 1,220 turbines, down from a peak of more than 4,200 in 1987. The reduction is the result of repowering, where many small, obsolete turbines are replaced with fewer, larger turbines.

The San Gorgonio Pass is now home to the Desert Peak Energy Facility, a battery energy storage system located adjacent to the Devers electrical substation. Phase I of the facility came online in 2023, while Phase II is anticipated in the coming years.

== Utilities ==
Southern California Edison operates several high-voltage electrical transmission lines through the pass, leading to and from its Devers substation located north of Palm Springs. Path 46 500 kilo-volt (kV) power lines cross the pass on the northern edge of San Jacinto Peak. These lines effectively link the Los Angeles metropolitan area with the Palo Verde Nuclear Power Plant in Arizona. A single 500 kV line was upgraded to two lines in 2013, known as Devers-Palo Verde 2 (DPV2). The existing 220 kV transmission line heading west was doubled in 2021.

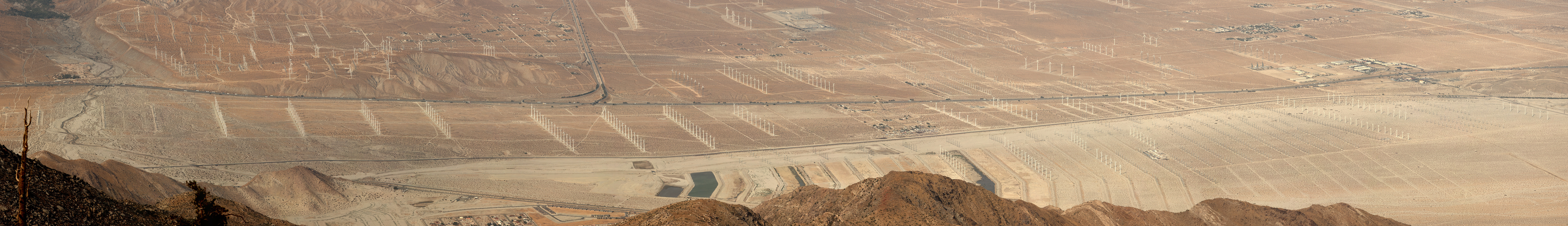
The majority of the San Gorgonio Pass wind farm viewed from atop the Palm Springs Aerial Tramway in the San Jacinto Mountains to the south. The farm continues over the hills to the north along California State Route 62. Interstate 10 traverses the image horizontally, and a small portion of State Route 111 is also visible at the bottom of the photo.

== History and governance ==
Dew R. Oliver, president of the Oliver Electric Power Corporation, was the earliest to promote the idea of generating electricity from wind in the San Gorgonio Pass area. In 1926 Oliver, in collaboration with electrician W. Sperry Knighton, built a wind turbine near Whitewater. The original device used a generator Oliver had salvaged from an old roller coaster at Seal Beach, California. Oliver and Sperry fitted the generator with aluminum propellers, and placed a large funnel on the front to concentrate the wind's power. They set the entire device on a circular rail that allowed it to be pivoted to face prevailing winds. (Note: A photo of the Oliver turbine can be found on page 13 of the March 18, 1956 edition of the Riverside Daily Press.)

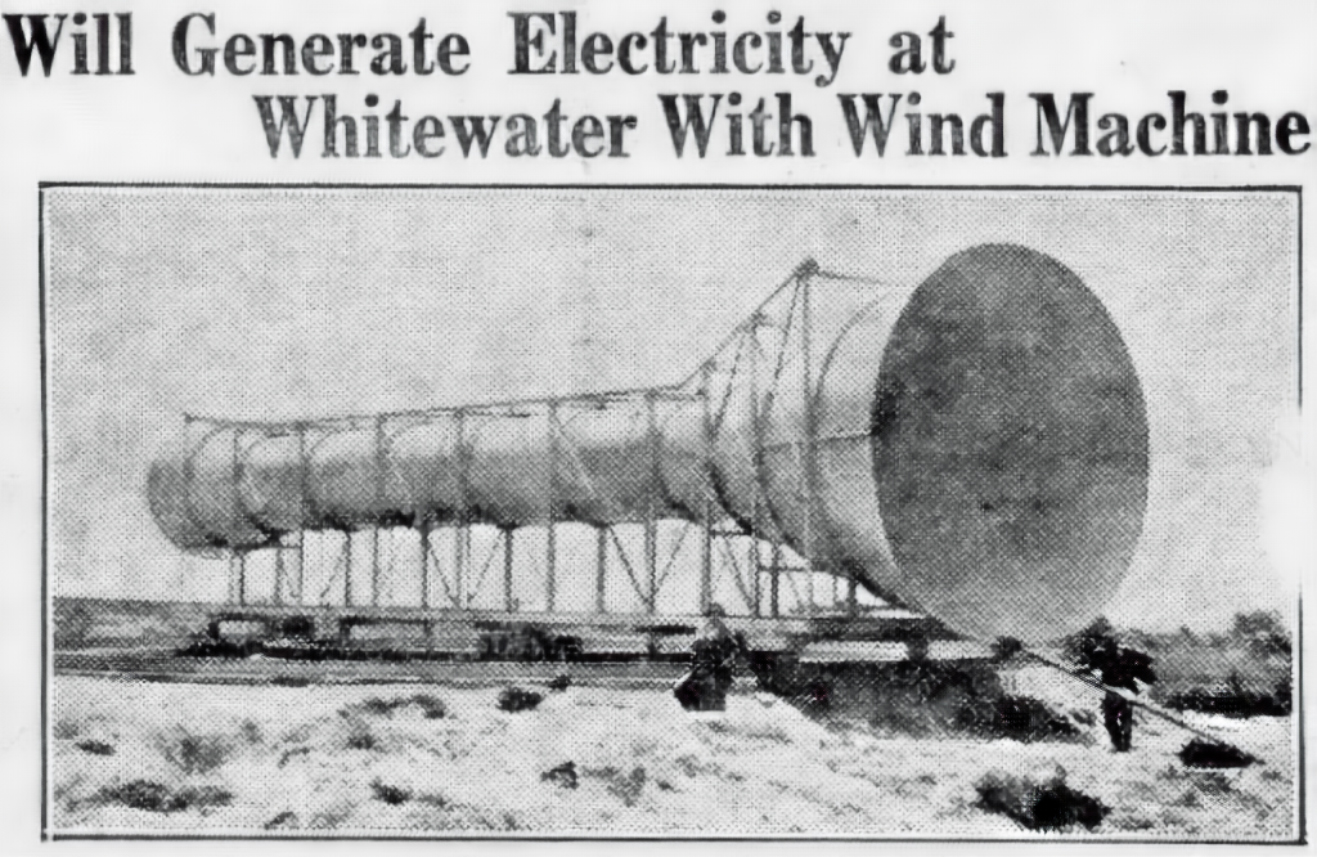
The Dew Oliver wind machine was featured in the Riverside Daily News on 11 June 1927.

The powerful wind quickly burned out the 25,000 watt unit, but a larger unit was obtained from the Pacific Electric substation in Los Angeles. After the two worked out other mechanical issues, Oliver set out to raise funds to expand the enterprise, with the vision of powering all of nearby Palm Springs. Oliver incorporated the Oliver Electric Power Corporation in Reno, Nevada, began selling stock in the company, but quickly ran afoul of newly enacted California corporate security laws. Oliver was jailed for a short time, then placed on two years probation, but his plans proceeded no further. The device he had built near Whitewater became a landmark and curiosity until it was taken down and sold for scrap in 1942.

Southern California Edison opened its Wind Energy Center eight miles northwest of Palm Springs in 1980 near its Devers substation, installing two wind turbine generators for testing. One of these was the SWT-3 horizontal axis wind turbine generator designed by Charles Schachle and produced by the Bendix Corporation. It featured three 82.5-foot blades mounted on a rotor standing 110 feet above the ground. The SWT-3 never achieved its rated power production due to losses in its hydraulic drive, limiting electric output to 1.1 MW. The second turbine tested at the Edison site was a 500-kilowatt vertical axis wind turbine generator produced by Alcoa. The Alcoa unit self-destructed just two weeks after installation in 1981 on the eve of the first American Wind Energy Conference in Palm Springs.

In 1982 wind energy development in the San Gorgonio Pass area was formally studied, and the results published in the San Gorgonio Wind Resource Study EIR (1982), a joint environmental document prepared for the U.S. Bureau of Land Management and Riverside County. The document assessed three scenarios for wind energy development in the area and included criteria for the development of wind energy on both a countywide basis and specifically for the San Gorgonio Pass area.

The first commercial wind farm was established by San Gorgonio Farms on a land parcel adjacent to the Devers substation, consisting of eight 25-kiloWatt downwind turbines. By 1987, fourteen independent operators had installed over 4200 wind turbines in the area. Since then, many wind projects have changed owners and others were repowereed, replacing many older wind turbines at the end of their useful lifetime with fewer but larger new ones.

Today the turbines range from 80 feet (24 m) to 300 feet (91 m) in height. The recent repower projects included:

- 2020: Painted Hills Repower replaced 291 old machines with nine new turbines.
- 2020: Desert Hot Springs Repower replaced 69 antiquated turbines with four large new machines.
- 2021: Coachella Hills (formerly Coachella Flats) installed 17 modern large wind turbines, replacing 363 old small ones.
- 2022: Mountain View Repower removed 93 outdated machines and installed 16 new ones having 3.6 MW to 4.3 MW output capacity.
- 2023-2024: Mesa Repower and Alta Mesa Repower combined to replace 620 aging wind turbine in the hills west of the Whitewater River with thirteen new ones.

All of these 2020-era repowering efforts installed Vestas V112 or V117 wind turbines, producing between 3.0 and 4.3 MW, the largest blade reaching 492 feet above the ground. Note the permitted projects often allow for more new turbines than actually installed. The as-installed number of turbines are listed.

Panoramic view of the San Gorgonio Pass wind farm

A 2008 proposal details an upgrade to the facilities to begin construction by September 2011. The proposed project would replace the 460 existing wind turbines with 30 new turbines in two phases. Phase 1 would remove approximately 74 non-operational turbines and install up to fifteen new 1.5 MW GE SLE wind turbines. Phase 2 would remove approximately 384 Vestas V15 65kW turbines and install an additional fifteen 1.5 MW GE SLE wind turbines. The proposed project would therefore comprise a total of 30 wind turbines, each 330 feet tall.

Prior to the 2020-era repowering, a significant repower began in 2008 and completed in 2011. It replaced 460 existing wind turbines with 33 new turbines, replacing 74 non-operational Kenetech turbines and approximately 384 Vestas V15 65kW turbines. The new machines are 1.5 MW GE SLE wind turbines, each 330 feet tall.

== Further information ==
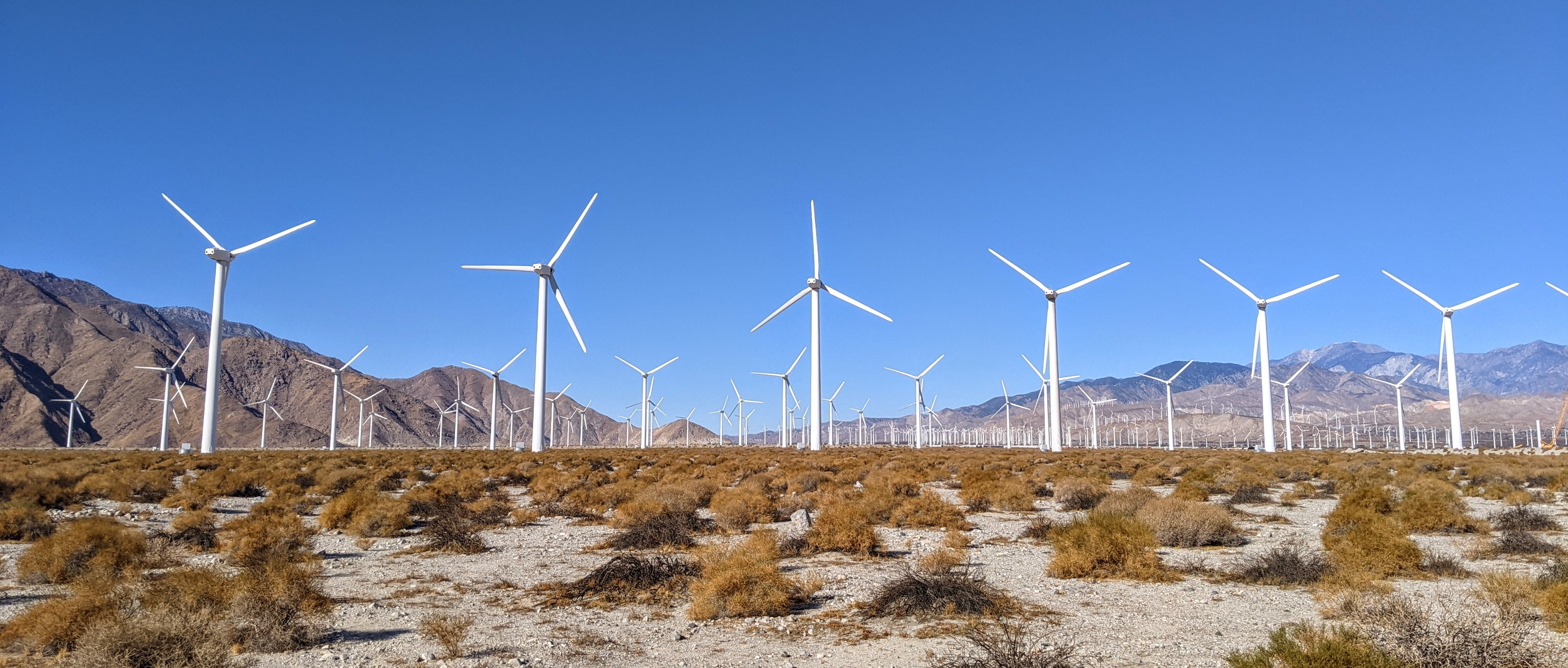
Wind Turbines close to Palm Springs, from Indian Canyon Road. Some of the windmills here in the distance stand in lines on the levees between the absorption ponds where water from the Colorado River Aqueduct is used to recharge the Coachella Valley aquifer.

- In 1998 Huell Howser Productions, in association with KCET/Los Angeles, featured the windfarms in California's Gold; the 30 minute program is available on VHS. A second Howser/California's Gold program on the wind farms was produced in 2010.

== See also ==
- Wind power in California
- Wind power in the United States
- List of onshore wind farms
- The Passage – a novel by Justin Cronin which features the wind farm
