= Wind power in California =

Electricity from large wind farms

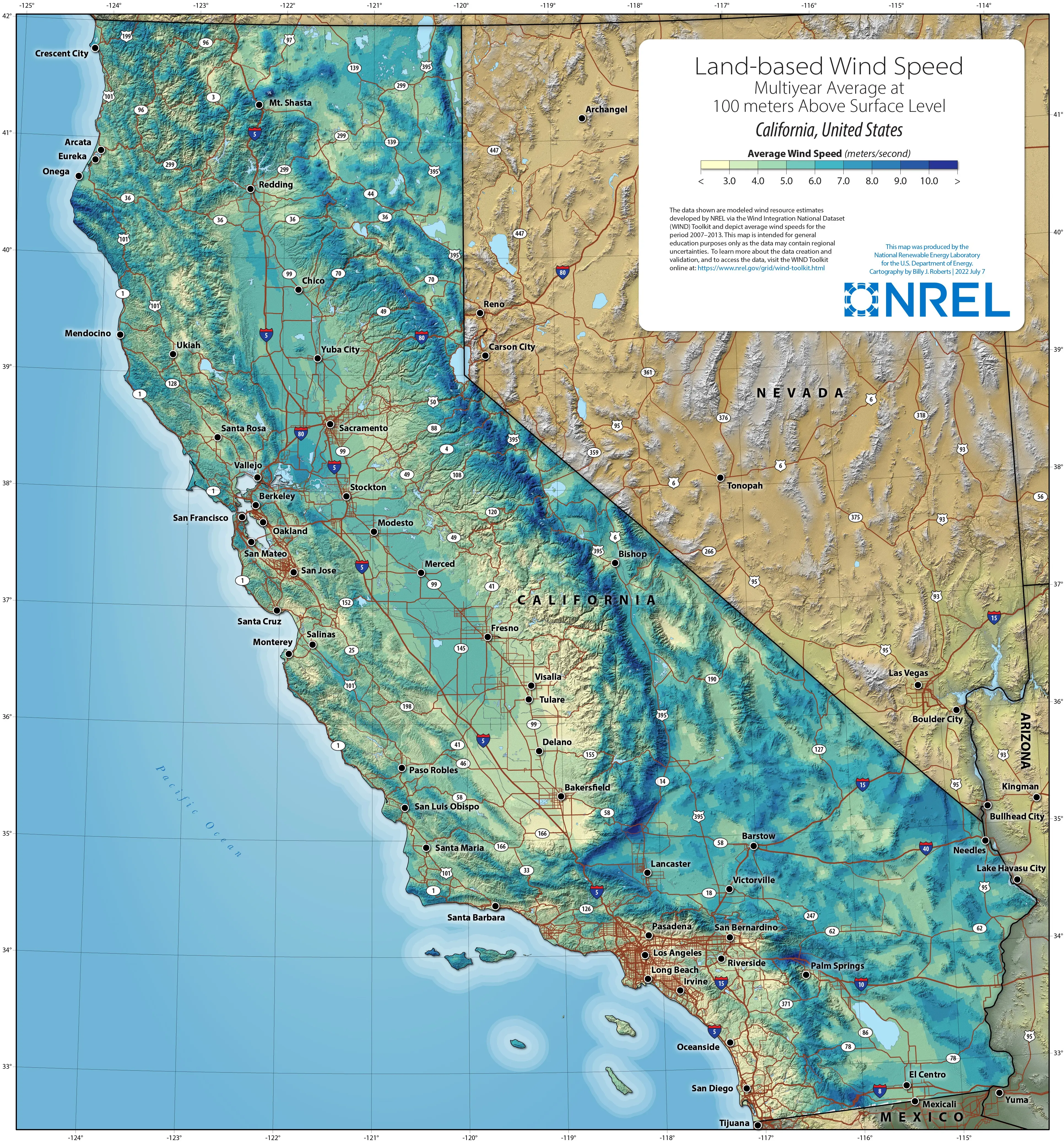
California wind resources

The initiative and early development of wind power in California came during Governor Jerry Brown's first two terms in the late 1970s and early 1980s. The state's wind power capacity has grown by nearly 350% since 2001, when it was less than 1,700 MW. According to the California Energy Comission, as of 2025, California had approximately 6,330 MW of wind energy capacity installed across the state. In 2025, wind projects in California generated 15,171 gigawatt-hours (GWh) of electricity, accounting for 7.38% of all power generated within the state. Additionally, California imported 17,981 GWh of wind energy from out-of-state projects. Combined, wind energy supplied 12.39% of California's total system power in 2025. Most of California's wind generation is found in the Tehachapi area of Kern County, with some large projects in Solano, Contra Costa and Riverside counties as well. California is among the states with the largest amount of installed wind power capacity. In recent years, California has lagged behind other states when it comes to the installation of wind power. It was ranked 4th overall for wind power electrical generation at the end of 2016, behind Texas, Iowa, and Oklahoma.

== History ==
California was the first U.S. state where large wind farms were developed, beginning in the early 1980s. By 1995, California produced 30 percent of the entire world's wind-generated electricity. Wind power in Texas surpassed the production in California to become the leader in the United States.

Historically, most of California's wind power output has been in three primary regions: Altamont Pass wind farm (east of San Francisco); Tehachapi Pass wind farm (south east of Bakersfield) and San Gorgonio Pass wind farm (near Palm Springs, east of Los Angeles). A fourth area, the Montezuma Hills of Solano County, was developed in 2005–2009, with the large Shiloh wind power plant.

The Alta Wind Energy Center is a wind farm located in Tehachapi Pass in Kern County. Kern County is reviewing a number of other proposed wind projects that would generate a combined 4,600 megawatts of renewable energy if approved.

Large wind farms in California
Name	Location	Capacity (MW)	Status	Ref
Altamont Pass wind farm	Alameda County	576	Operational	
Alta Wind Energy Center	Kern County	1548	Operational	
Ocotillo wind energy project	Imperial County	315	Operational	
San Gorgonio Pass wind farm	Riverside County	615	Operational	
Shiloh wind power plant	Solano County	505	Operational	
Tehachapi Pass wind farm	Kern County	705	Operational	
Tule wind energy project	San Diego County	131.1	Operational	

California wind farms

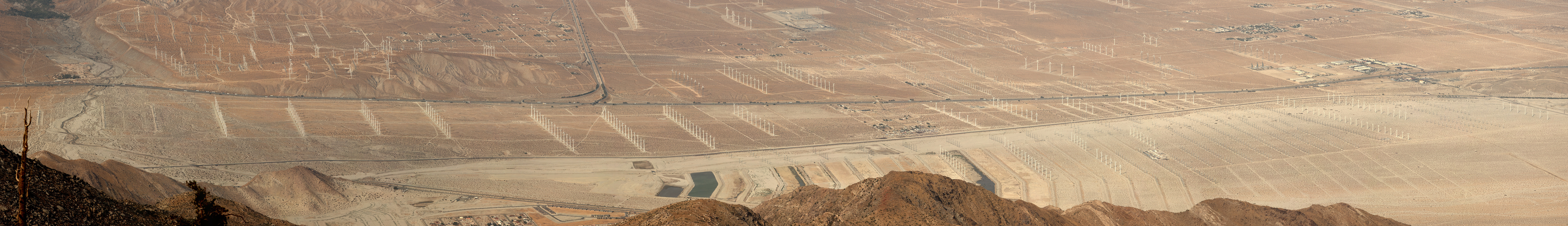
The majority of the San Gorgonio Pass wind farm as viewed from the San Jacinto Mountains to the south. (The farm continues over the hills to the north along California State Route 62 and is not visible from this vantagepoint). The layout includes a variety of large modern and older smaller turbine designs

== Growth ==
California wind generation capacity by year	California wind generation by year
Megawatts of wind capacity, 1999-2020	Gigawatt-hours generated per year, 2001-2020

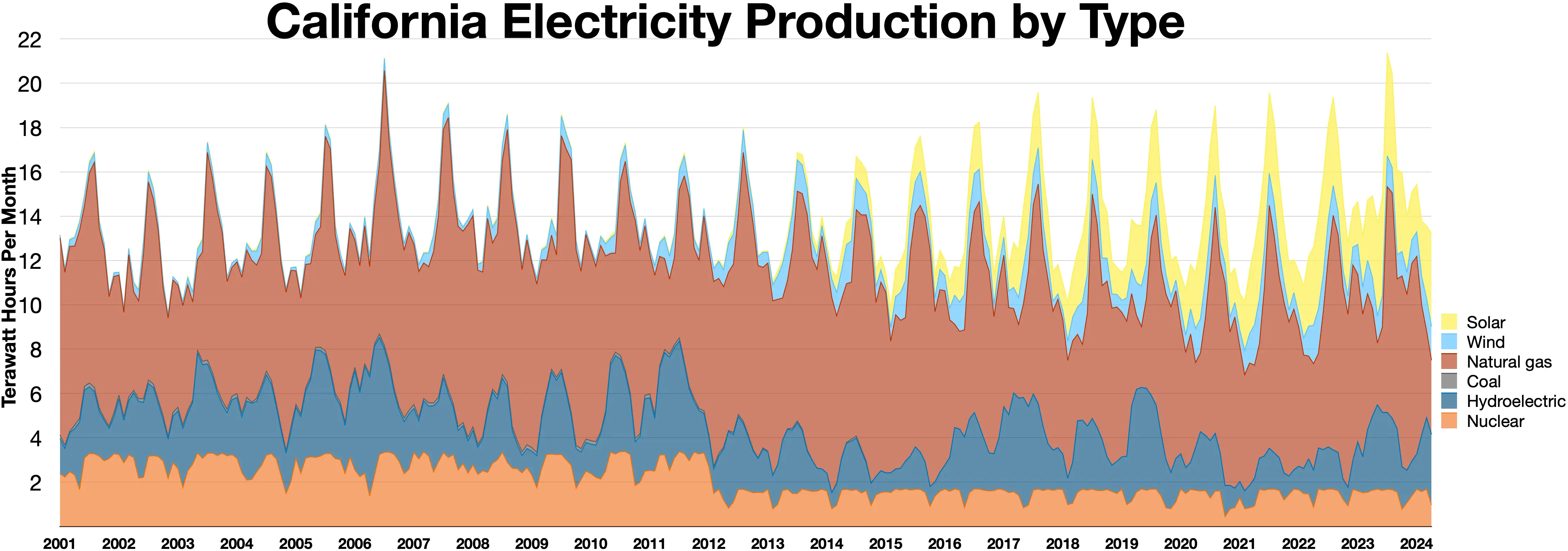
California electricity production by type

In 2011, 921.3 MW of new production capacity was installed: mostly in the Tehachapi area of Kern County, with some big projects in Solano, Contra Costa and Riverside counties as well.

California had a total of 5,662 MW of installed wind generation capacity at the end of 2015. After leading the country for many years, in 2016 California ranked fourth nationwide in terms of capacity, behind Texas, Iowa, and Oklahoma. In 2016, California used about 285,700 GWh and generated 13,500 GWh of wind energy in-state.

Wind energy supplied about 6.9% of California's total electricity needs in 2017 (including power supplied from other states), and 12.39% in 2025.

Due to higher average wind speeds in the plains area of the U.S., California ranked fifth in wind generation in 2018.

In January 2018, the Tule Wind Project came online. Located in eastern San Diego County, the facility has 57 wind turbines which collectively generate 131.1 MW of electricity. There are plans to expand this project by an additional 24 turbines in the future. In its current configuration, the installation is able to power an estimated 40,000 homes. CAISO tested the wind farm's synchronverter in 2018, and found it could perform some of the grid services similar or better than traditional generators.

In February 2018, Scout Clean Energy of Colorado won the rights to modernize the Gonzaga Ridge wind farm which is located in Pacheco State Park. Rated at 16.5 MW, the Gonzaga Ridge facility currently uses 1980s era wind turbines which are smaller, less cost-effective, and overall far less efficient at generating energy than those which currently being produced. The electrical output of Gonzaga Ridge after modernization is projected to be between 65 MW and 80 MW.

== Offshore wind ==
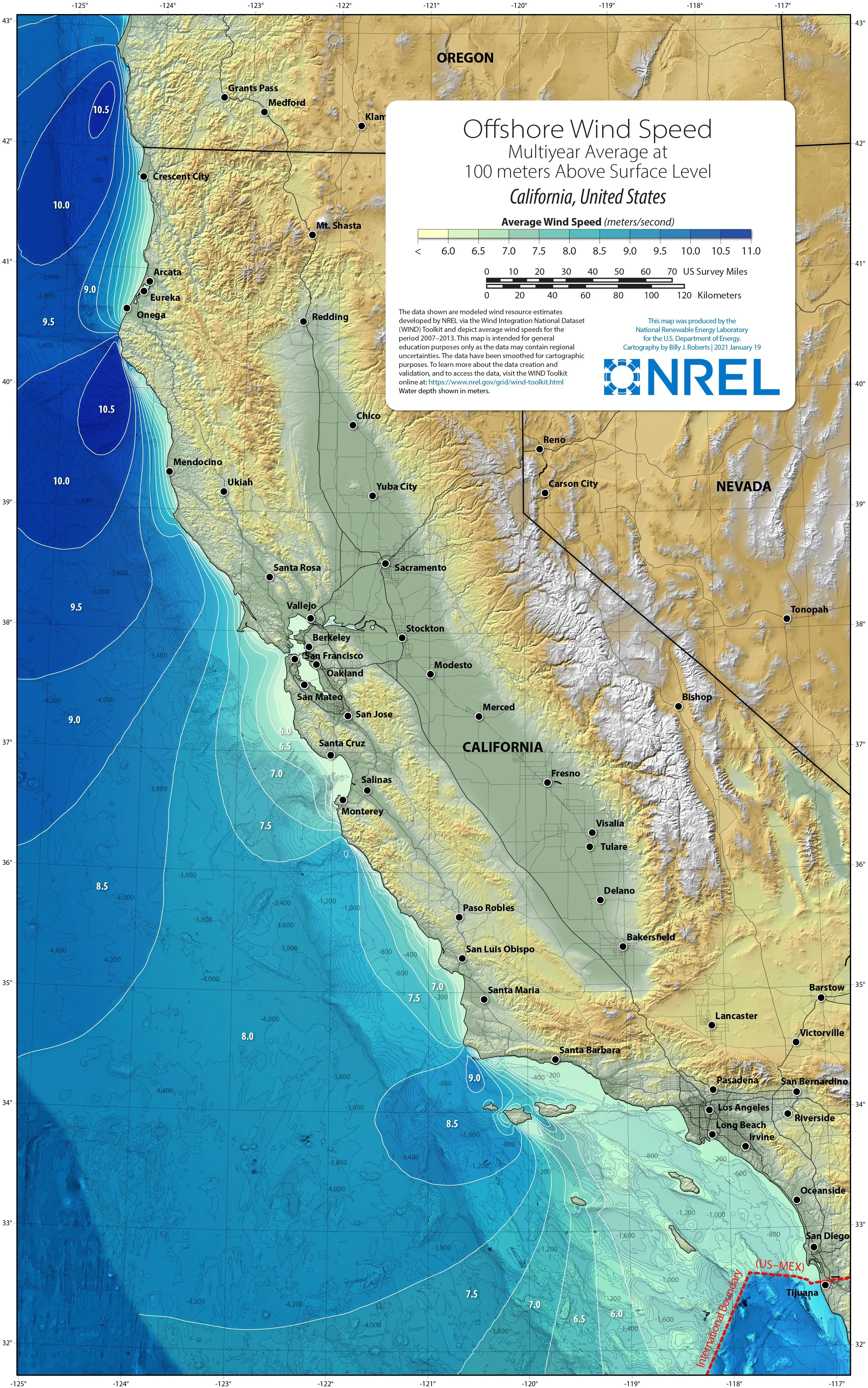
Offshore wind potential

A 2009 Stanford University study of California offshore wind potential identified a site off Cape Mendocino that could provide uninterrupted year-round power from a 1500 MW wind farm that would produce an average of 790 MW. Three types of offshore wind power were studied, with the conclusion that from 12,300 to 19,700 GWh/yr could be delivered from 1,997 to 3,331 MW of monopile wind turbines installed in up to 66-foot deep water (20 m), from 38,200 to 73,000 GWh/yr could be delivered from 6,202 to 12,374 MW of multi-leg wind turbines in 66-to-164-foot deep water (20 to 50 m), and from 462,100 to 568,200 GWh/yr from 73,025 to 91,707 MW of floating turbine foundation wind turbines in from 160-to-950-foot deep water (50 to 290 m), such as those being studied for use off the coast of Maine by the Ocean Energy Institute and the DeepCwind Consortium.

In April 2018, several power development companies joined with Redwood Coast Energy Authority to explore the idea of creating a large-scale wind farm off of the Northern California coast. Deep water has hindered development off the coast of California, making the use floating turbines more feasible than fixed turbines. The group decided to propose instead. RCEA and the development companies intended to file a lease with the Bureau of Ocean Energy Management in the summer of 2018 for the 120-150 MW project. The Humboldt Project site was just over 20 miles (32 km) west of Eureka, California with an estimated date of completion in 2024.

In 2021 the Biden administration approved large areas off the coast California for development of wind farms with floating turbines. In 2022, the US Bureau of Ocean Energy Management (BOEM) issued a statement of no significant environmental impact, and California set a target of 25 GW of offshore wind by 2045. In 2026, the second Trump administration negotiated a series of deals that stopped three of the state’s five offshore wind projects.

== Annual generation ==
California electricity generation sources in 2018

California wind generation (GWh)
Year	Total	Jan	Feb	Mar	Apr	May	Jun	Jul	Aug	Sep	Oct	Nov	Dec
2001	3,499	133	148	300	393	378	438	440	408	293	253	143	172
2002	3,800	131	153	267	409	478	557	443	476	295	284	158	149
2003	3,896	109	193	326	424	453	549	432	396	340	285	188	201
2004	4,305	130	201	288	399	634	683	588	492	359	259	155	117
2005	4,261	175	150	334	429	551	584	497	384	404	322	217	214
2006	4,883	281	215	389	430	577	596	538	500	402	396	292	267
2007	5,586	233	307	442	612	732	729	675	600	486	349	188	233
2008	5,385	271	262	450	538	691	658	700	648	406	298	223	240
2009	5,840	150	245	442	603	701	850	879	679	480	406	235	170
2010	6,080	150	221	399	546	689	867	925	731	551	372	305	324
2011	7,749	234	429	612	960	1,026	1,021	869	908	522	415	428	325
2012	9,754	419	581	769	768	1,316	1,362	1,001	1,001	697	776	385	679
2013	12,820	482	727	1,056	1,550	1,740	1,631	1,413	1,297	1,158	750	556	460
2014	12,993	500	831	1,055	1,306	1,766	1,858	1,408	1,286	953	759	705	566
2015	12,229	187	619	826	1,262	1,681	1,668	1,445	1,523	815	667	619	917
2016	13,508	691	528	1,305	1,325	1,596	1,670	1,697	1,472	996	935	528	765
2017	12,824	815	751	954	1,212	1,644	1,638	1,417	1,642	1,217	839	452	243
2018	14,025	424	887	1,060	1,234	1,929	1,784	1,565	1,645	1,259	1,029	639	570
2019	13,736	537	1,054	1,091	1,475	1,838	1,564	1,674	1,469	1,210	877	467	480
2020	13,582	763	780	1,131	1,521	1,553	1,722	1,691	1,440	797	868	664	652
2021	15,628	1,065	1,041	1,590	1,645	1,676	1,336	1,093	1,331	1,011	1,268	1,187	1,385
2022	16,018	1,187	1,204	1,551	1,746	1,864	1,503	1,473	1,105	888	1,006	1,284	1,207
2023	4,223	1,381	1,305	1,537									

California wind generation in 2014

California wind generation in 2015

== See also ==
- Solar power in California
- Renewable energy in California
- Wind power in the United States
- Renewable energy in the United States
- List of wind farms in the United States
- Clipper Windpower
