= Renewable energy in California =

Solar, geothermal, and biomass and hydroelectric power generation

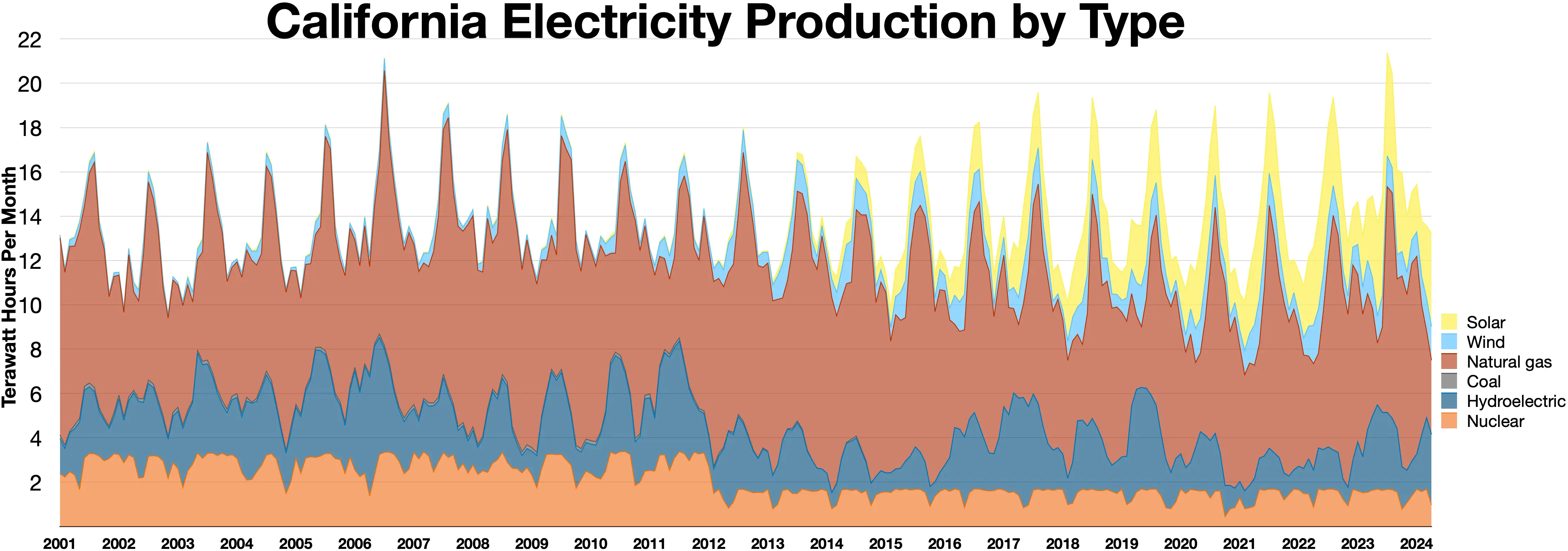
California electricity production by type

California produces more renewable energy than any other state in the United States except Texas. In 2018, California ranked first in the nation as a producer of electricity from solar, geothermal, and biomass resources and fourth in the nation in conventional hydroelectric power generation. As of 2017, over half of the electricity (52.7%) produced was from renewable sources.

== Legal renewables requirement ==
In 2006, the California legislature passed the Global Warming Solutions Act of 2006 which set a goal for 33% of electricity consumption in California to be generated by renewable sources by 2020.

In 2015, SB350 mandated that electric utilities purchase 50% of their electricity from renewable sources by 2030.

Then in 2018, Senate Bill 100 was passed which increased the renewables requirement for electric utilities to 50% by 2026, 60% by 2030, and 100% by 2045.

In March 2022, CPUC approved a plan to add 18.8 GW solar, 6.7 GW wind, and 14.7 GW batteries by 2032 at 18c/kWh, reaching 73% renewables.

== Significance at national level ==
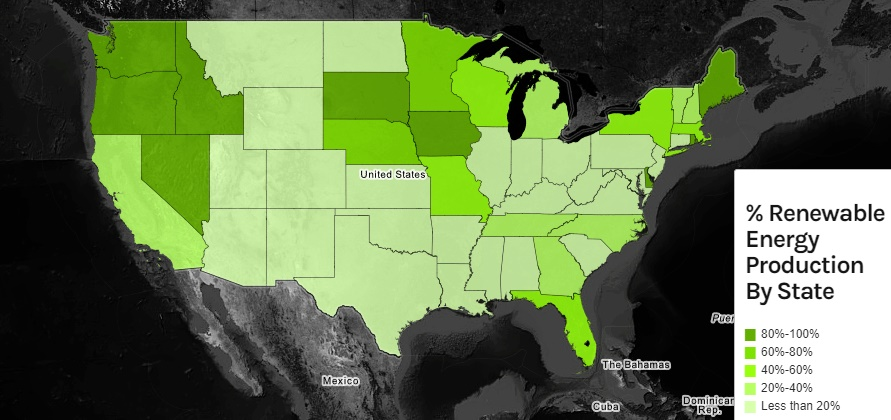

California's total energy consumption is second-highest in the nation but the state's per capita energy consumption is the fourth-lowest, due in part to its mild climate and its energy efficiency programs. The percentage of renewable energy in California is perhaps made more notable by the particularly high population of the state, states with similar or higher percentages of renewable energy generally have lower populations. In 2009, the energy production in California was 8.43% of the nation's total renewable energy production, the second highest in the country after Washington. By 2017, California was the highest, with 10.05% of national renewable production.

== Hydroelectric power generation ==
Hydroelectric power is power created from the energy of running water. This water is usually stored and controlled by dams. Its productivity changes in accordance to how much rainfall is produced annually. In 2018, California ranked second in the United States for conventional hydroelectric generation, however this is highly variable depending on droughts. For instance it obtained 21% of its electricity through hydroelectric power sources in 2017. This was higher than the previous year when only 14% of its electricity was produced through hydroelectric power. A drought in 2012 led to a reduction in the generation of hydroelectric power. Because of this, in 2014 the Energy Commission of California began to track the conditions on how the drought started. Utilities responded to the decrease in precipitation and lack of hydroelectric power by making short-term market purchases and relying on other renewable sources of electricity. Recovery from the drought started in late 2016, partly due to increased precipitation that restored hydroelectric power to normal conditions.

=== History of hydroelectric power generation in California ===
San Bernardino, California became the first western region state to receive a hydroelectric plant in 1887. San Bernardino also received a voltage increase of 10,000 in 1892, from a 42-mile line extension that originated from a single phase 120 kilowatt (kW) plant built in San Antonio Creek, California. While this is occurring in California, in the same year, Edison General Electric and Thomas Houston combine to form General Electric. An ore mill owned by Standard Consolidated Mining, began receiving electricity from a 12.5-mile 2,500 AC power line that originated in Bodie, California.

With the first three-phase hydroelectric system being built in Germany back in 1891, the U.S. gets its first three phase system in 1893 in Mill Creek, California: featuring a line connection that extended 8 miles and carried 2,400 volts of electricity. Folsom, California received the same type of system in 1893 as well, except it had 11,000 volt alternators put in place, and its power line extended all the way to the state capitol, Sacramento.

The acquisition of Colgate hydroelectric plants in 1899 by Sacramento Power & Light Corporation gives them ownership of a 62-mile long power line extension.

In 1901, Bay Counties Power Company builds a 142-mile long power line from the Colgate hydroelectric plant, to Oakland, California.

In the 1902 Reclamation act, the authority to install and input hydroelectric facilities was given to what would later become the Bureau of Reclamation.

In 1920, the Federal Power Commission is created through the Federal Power Act with the authority to give licenses for companies to build hydroelectric facilities. Two years later in 1922, the first hydroelectric plant is built to meet peaking power capacity.

In 1944, Shasta Dam begins producing electricity for the first time in California.

The late 1960s and the 1970s ushered in an era of protection policies from the federal government. The first was the 1968 Wild and Scenic Rivers Act, which stopped any attempt to build hydroelectric facilities on or near rivers. The National Environment Policy Act followed the year after in 1969; and it enforced the idea of protecting the environment amongst the many federal agencies. Then came the Fish and Wildlife Coordination Act in 1974, protecting species of fish and wildlife from the activities of the federal government. Four years later, the year 1978 brought about the Public Utility Regulatory Policies act, which allowed utility companies to go without federal licensing for hydroelectric projects.

By 2008, the United States gets 6 percent of its electric power from hydroelectric production.

== Solar power generation ==
Solar power is power generated via the collection of the sunlight exerted from the sun. In 2018, California ranked first in the United States for solar power generation. Over the past eight years, the prices of solar panels and solar power have fallen considerably. In 2010, only about 0.5% of California's electricity came from solar power, although this percentage rose to about 10% in 2016. According to the U.S. Energy Information Administration, solar electricity costs about 5 to 6 cents per kilowatt-hour, in part due to California's emphasis on solar power. This price is on par with the cost to produce electricity through a natural gas plant and is half of the cost of a nuclear power facility. On December 5, 2018, the California Building Standards Commission voted unanimously to add energy standards to the state building code, officially making California the first state in the United States to require that new homes, built in 2020 and later, be solar powered.

In recent years, California's electricity generation from solar power has increased substantially. There have been issues with solar power plants producing too much electricity for the transmission grid to handle and the state to use. In March 2017, California produced so much extra solar power it paid Arizona to take the electricity, saving Arizona substantial amounts of money on electricity. While solar power has been vital in reducing greenhouse gas emissions in California, a recent life cycle assessment found that solar energy also contributes significantly to environmental problems, particularly acidification potential (AP), due to the intensity of material use and emissions during production.

=== History of Solar Power Generation in California ===
Electricity generated from sunlight via silicon solar cells was the invention produced by Bell Laboratories D.M. Chapin, C.S. Fuller and G.L. Pearson in 1954. In 1978, the U.S. Congress passed The Energy Tax Act. This was to counter the Arab Oil Embargo which generated an energy crisis in the U.S. during the 1970s. A 40% tax credit was given to homes that installed solar devices on their homes on or after April 20, 1977, and before January 1, 1986. Even though this policy was rolled back by the Reagan administration, this led to the rise in utility-scale solar systems and turbines in California.

The world's largest photovoltaic cell manufacturing facility was built in Camarillo, California by ARCO in 1979. Within a four-year period, ARCO built a facility in the Californian Carrissa Plain, capable of generating 6 megawatts of photovoltaic cells. Later expanded to two megawatts, a 1.0 megawatt photovoltaic power plant was built in the Sacramento Municipality Utility District in 1984. Two years later in 1986, featured in California's Mojave Desert was the largest solar thermal electricity facility. Currently, this same facility generates 300 megawatts of solar thermal energy.

Pacific Gas and Electric Company (PG&E) built a 500-kilowatt grid-supporting photovoltaic system in Kerman, California. Being 1993, it was the first of its kind "distributed power" PV installment. In 1996, solar two illustrated how the storing of energy with efficiency could allow power and electricity to be generated even at night. This is why the U.S. Department of Energy and an industry consortium upgraded from solar-one, to solar-two.

Also in 1996, the state legislature and Governor Pete Wilson put in place Assembly Bill 1890: which boosted incentives to produce more grid-based PV systems under the direction of the California Energy Commission's Renewable Energy Program, while at the same time weakening state investor-owned electric utilities. Senate Bill 90, which supported the provisions of Assembly Bill 1890, focused the resources of the Energy Commission to renewable energy. Uplifting a self-sustaining market for "emerging" renewable energy technologies was the objective in Senate Bill 90.

=== Technology used for Solar Power Generation ===
The technology behind solar power generation varies, depending on the method being used to generate power. Photovoltaic (PV), concentrating solar power (CSP), and solar heating and cooling (SHC) systems are the three different solar technologies used to generate power.

Photovoltaic cells convert sunlight into power directly. Observed on solar panels, photovoltaic is the more familiar method of technology in regards to solar power. They can be seen on the roofs of homes, in a field next to schools, behind stores, etc. Concentrating solar power (CSP) features massive areas of solar mirrors that indirectly generate power. They are more so used in large scale facilities and campuses like power plants. Solar heating and cooling technology takes heat from the sun and provides for things like water heating, space heating, and more.

=== How the process works ===
Solar energy is produced in three different ways as mentioned above: via photovoltaic cells (PV), concentrating solar power (CSP), and solar heating and cooling (SHC).

In the case of photovoltaic cells, electricity is generated via the absorption of sunlight. The sunlight is converted into electricity by a semi-conductor. The photons, after phasing through the semi-conductor, loses their electrons.

Concentrating solar power (CSP) features turbines powered by huge areas of solar mirrors that in turn derive energy from the sun.

Solar heating and cooling (SHC) systems can be installed into homes just like other basic installations. Solar water heating provides that a solar collector store heated water, which is warmed by thermal energy from the sun, in a storage tank. Hot or cold, this water can then be used for any residential purposes.

== Geothermal power generation ==
Geothermal power is power generated via the collection of thermal energy, stored over millions of years in the Earth's core. In 2017, California ranked first in the United States in geothermal power generation. California is located on the Pacific Ring of Fire, with the conjunctions of tectonic plates providing California the largest potential for producing geothermal energy generation in the country. Most of California's geothermal plants are located slightly north of San Francisco in Lake Folsom and Sonoma Counties. This is due to the geysers geothermal resource area, which produces electricity from dry steam. This area has been producing electricity since the mid-1960s, with dry steam in this location existing in only one of two places in the world.

There are 43 operating geothermal power plants in California, which produced 11,745 gigawatt-hours of electricity in 2017. This in-state generation, combined with 700 GWh of imported geothermal energy, led geothermal energy to contribute 5.69% of the state's total electricity usage in 2017.

=== History of geothermal power generation in California ===
In 1847, north of San Francisco, California, a streaming valley containing an area called "The Geysers." The area was discovered by William Bell Elliot. A member of John C. Fremonts's survey party, he believed he had found the gates of hell.

In 1927, Imperial Valley, California featured the first exploratory wells. They were drilled by the Pioneer Development Company. Thirty-three years later in 1927, the Pacific Gas and Electric Company began the operating the nation's first large-scale geothermal electricity-generating plant. Encompassing an 11 megawatts (MW) productivity of net power, it lasted for three decades.

Seal of the United States Department of Energy

1970 brought about both the Geothermal Resources Council and The Geothermal Stream Act. The Geothermal Resources Council was to inspire the development of geothermal resources around the world. The Geothermal Stream Act, established in the U.S. that the Secretary of the Interior have the power to lease federal publicly owned lands to geothermal explorations. The rest of the 1970s saw a rise in geothermal organizations. One of those was The U.S. Department of Energy (DOE), which was established in 1977. The Imperial Valley in California gets the first electrical development of a water-dominated geothermal resource in 1979.

Producing 10 megawatts (MW), 1980 brings about the first geothermal flash plant, producing 10 megawatts (MW) in Brawley, California. It's developed by the Union Oil Company of California (UNOCAL). In 2005, the Energy Policy act evolved America's policy by giving tax incentives for energy production. This made for a more competitive environment for geothermal energy with fossil fuels.

== Biomass power generation ==
Biomass power is power generated by extracting the energy stored in plants and animals. Biomass is all solid, nonhazardous, cellulosic material taken from forested areas. California ranked first in the United States in power generation from biomass in 2017. Biomass-based electricity in California produced 5,767 gigawatt-hours of electricity in 2017, contributing to about 2.8 percent of the state's total energy usage. There are 93 operating biomass-based power plants in California.

California's biomass power mostly comes from waste-to-energy based power plants. There are four specific types of biomass power generation in California: biomass, digester gas (anaerobic digestion), landfill gas, and municipal solid waste. In addition to these four categories, there is one biomass electricity plant in the state that uses chipped-up forest residue as fuel for electricity generation.

== Wind power generation ==
California ranked fourth in the United States in wind power generation in 2017, behind Texas, Oklahoma, and Iowa. Wind power in California generated about 13,500 gigawatt-hours of electricity in 2016; this amounts to about 6.81 percent of the state's electricity usage. This number does not account for homes and farms that use personal turbines to produce power.

=== History of wind power generation in California ===
Just like with solar energy, tax incentives from the Energy Tax Act (ETA) of 1978 led to a rise in wind based electrical systems in the state of California.

In 1978, wind developers began large wind projects in both Altamont Pass and Tehachapi, California. Three years later in 1981, utilities were required to establish long-term possessions of alternative energy because of a boom in wind energy production, which was caused by the movements and changes made by the California Public Utility Commission. However, by 1985 the need for wind power retracted a little due to a drop in oil prices. So, California utility companies stop contracting deals that involved wind power because the incentive decayed a little. Still, that did not stop the production of wind power in California. In fact, in that same year (1985), productivity was still active enough for a preference on the type of turbine installed by companies. The 56-100 kW machine became the most preferred wind turbine in the United States. Most if not all of those turbines resided in California by 1986, with Altamont Pass encompassing 6,200 turbines, and California wind farms having a 1,200 megawatt (MW) total capacity.

The 2005 Energy Policy Act, like it did the other types of renewable energy sources, effected the capacity to which the U.S. could produce electricity via the wind, by increasing it. By 2015, California is leading the way when it comes to renewable energy, and begins establishing more opportunities to expand the use of wind energy with a 50 percent renewable portfolio standards (RPS).

== Renewable energy industry employment ==
A 2019 report from two non-profit environmental groups stated that "clean energy jobs" in California outnumbered fossil fuel jobs 5 to 1, but Jim Sweeney, a professor at Stanford's Precourt Energy Efficiency Center stated that two-thirds of the jobs labelled as "clean energy jobs" are jobs in energy efficiency, and are not new jobs, but rather a re-labelling of old jobs such as furnace installer (with more efficient furnaces.) He stated that a more fair comparison would show the same number of clean energy jobs as fossil fuel jobs.

In California, the clean energy economy provides 16% of clean energy jobs within the United States, which includes the 26.5% employment rates for renewable energy occupations. California had employed the most people during the COVID-19 pandemic (2019-2020), with a total of 485,000 new employees that is 3% of California's work force. Employees' hired in California for renewable energy occupations include 124,817 jobs in solar energy and 2,520 jobs in wind energy. Jobs provided to Californians' related to energy efficiency are categorized by manufacturing of clean vehicles (40,000 jobs), Clean storage (17,000 jobs), electricity grid modification (6,000 jobs), and all other indirect clean energy sectors (500,000 jobs).
