= Alta Wind Energy Center =

Wind farm in the Tehachapi Mountains of California

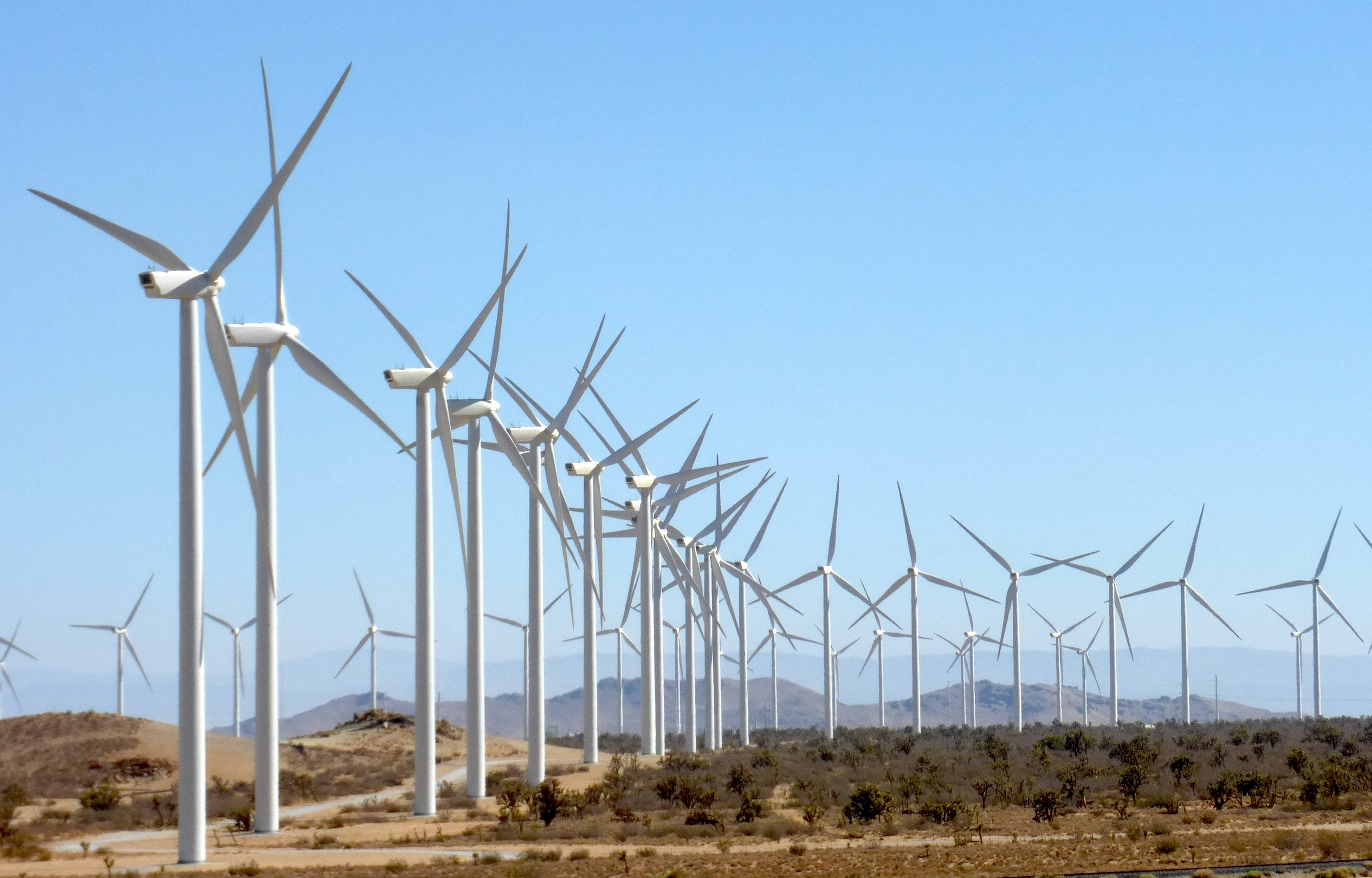
- Country: United States
- Location: Tehachapi Pass, Kern County, California
- Coordinates: 35°1′16″N 118°19′14″W
- Status: Operational
- Commission date: 2010
- Construction cost: $ 2.875 billion (units I-IX)

Wind farm
- Type: Onshore
- Site area: 130 km^{2}

Power generation
- Units operational: 600
- Make and model: Vestas
- Nameplate capacity: 1,550 MW
- Capacity factor: 23.5% (average 2014–2019)
- Annual net output: 3,189 GW·h

External links
- Commons: Related media on Commons

The Alta Wind Energy Center (AWEC; also known as Mojave Wind Farm) is a wind farm located in Tehachapi Pass of the Tehachapi Mountains, in Kern County, California. As of 2022, it is the largest wind farm in the United States, with a combined installed capacity of 1,550 MW (2,080,000 hp). The project, being developed near Tehachapi Pass Wind Farm— site of the first large-scale wind farms installed in the U.S. in the 1970s and 1980s—is "a powerful illustration of the growing size and scope of modern wind projects".

Southern California Edison has agreed to a 25-year power purchase agreement for the power produced as part of the power purchase agreements for up to 1500 MW or more of power generated from new projects to be built in the Tehachapi area. The project will "reduce carbon dioxide emissions by more than 5.2 million metric tons, which is equivalent to taking 446,000 cars off the road". A total of 3000 MW is planned.

The wind farm was developed by Terra-Gen Power which closed a US$1.2 billion financing deal in July 2010 with partners that included Citibank, Barclays Capital, and Credit Suisse. After many delays, the first phase began construction in 2010. Financing for additional phases of $650 million was secured in April 2012. Construction of the Alta Wind Energy Center is expected to create more than 3,000 domestic manufacturing, construction, and maintenance jobs, and contribute more than one billion dollars to the local economy.

== History ==
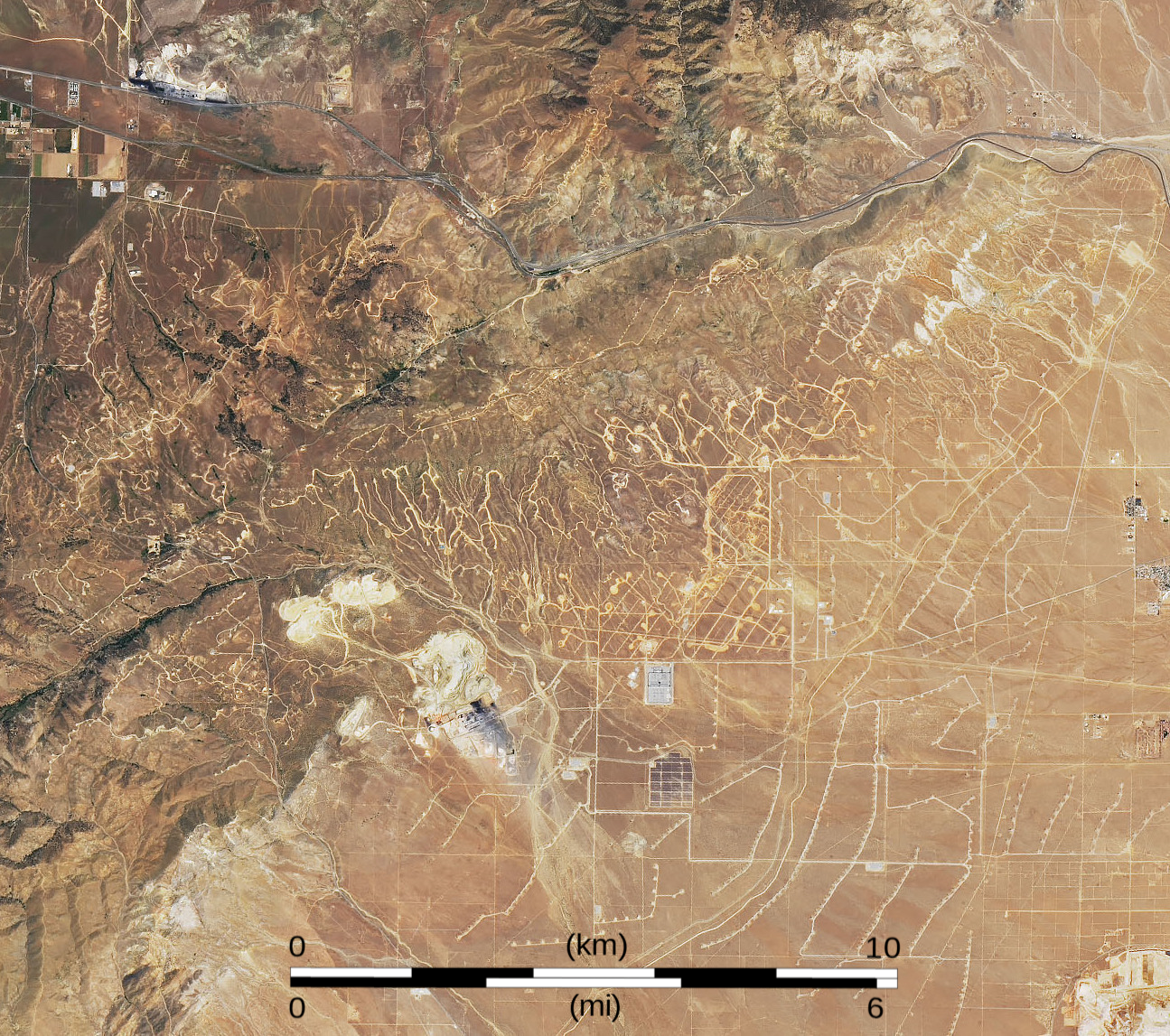
Alta Wind Energy Center and Tehachapi Pass wind farm from space, 2019

The original "Alta-Oak Creek Mojave Project" plan consisted of up to 320 wind turbines occupying a 9,000-acre (36 km^{2}) area while producing 800 MW of power. That project was originally developed by Oak Creek Energy Systems under the contract with Terra-Gen, but the project development was later transferred to Terra-Gen. The project then became the first development under the umbrella of Alta Wind Energy Center.

The Alta-Oak Creek Mojave Project is generally located at the south side of the log Creek Road, starting a few miles west of the state route 14 in Mojave and continuing westward along the Oak Creek Road to the west side of the Tehachapi-Willow Springs Road.

According to the American Wind Energy Association, two initial projects were completed in fall 2010, the 150 MW Alta II (Vestas) project using 50 3 MW generators and the 150 MW Alta I project using 100 1.5 MW generators. Three subsequent projects 150 MW Alta III, 102 MW Alta IV, and 168 MW Alta V projects were completed in the 2nd quarter of 2011 using 50, 34, and 56 3 MW Vestas V-90 wind turbines. Alta VIII and Alta VI projects, comprising 300 MW, were completed in late 2011/early 2012, but they were renamed Brookfield Tehachapi 2 and Mustang Hills respectively. Alta VII and IX projects comprising 300 MW, were completed in December 2012 (bringing the total to 1320 MW), but they were renamed to Pinyon Pines Wind I and Pinyon Pines Wind II.

138 MW Alta X and 90 MW Alta XI are under development with scheduled completion in late 2013, 180 MW Alta XIII in 2019.

== Overview ==
Plant	Operator	Capacity (MW)	Commissioned	Cost, $
Alta Wind Energy Center I	Terra-Gen Operating Co	150	Jan 2011	394 million
Alta Wind Energy Center II	Terra-Gen Operating Co	150	Jan 2011	1200 million (units II-V)
Alta Wind Energy Center III	Terra-Gen Operating Co	150	Feb 2011	
Alta Wind Energy Center IV	Terra-Gen Operating Co	102	Apr 2011	
Alta Wind Energy Center V	Terra-Gen Operating Co	168	Apr 2011	
Everpower Wind Holdings	Mustang Hills (Alta Wind VI)	150	May 2012	631 million (with unit VIII)
Pinyon Pines Wind I	Pinyon Pine I (Alta Wind VII)	168	Nov 2012	650 million (with unit IX)
Alta Wind VIII	Brookfield Energy Marketing	150	Jan 2012	
Pinyon Pines Wind II	Pinyon Pine II (Alta Wind IX)	132	Nov 2012	
Alta Wind X	Terra-Gen Operating Co	138	Jan 2014	
Alta Wind XI	Terra-Gen Operating Co	90	Jan 2014	

== Electricity production ==
Alta Wind Farm Generation (MW·h)
Year	Alta I 150 MW	Alta II 150 MW	Alta III 150 MW	Alta IV 102 MW	Alta V 168 MW	Alta VI 150 MW	Alta VII 168 MW	Alta VIII 150 MW	Alta IX 132 MW	Alta X 138 MW	Alta XI 90 MW	Total Annual MW·h
2011	395,703	336,193	364,270	149,373	239,021	-	-	-	-	-	-	1,484,560
2012	353,793	296,135	318,407	150,322	243,738	181,718	18,115	-	12,689	-	-	1,574,917
2013	398,985	348,908	361,051	178,777	283,238	302,869	363,653	285,358	258,485	-	-	2,781,324
2014	403,255	328,958	349,245	168,320	269,901	304,728	365,507	282,719	255,597	328,080	249,985	3,306,295
2015	341,120	279,829	300,282	134,744	220,012	252,832	288,517	231,524	202,586	309,408	222,142	2,782,996
2016	413,363	360,216	380,465	183,393	293,378	314,587	346,699	294,789	250,438	364,926	276,368	3,478,622
2017	366,518	325,932	350,502	162,752	263,466	289,326	319,578	251,380	230,440	340,379	248,865	3,149,138
2018	399,302	349,772	361,029	178,715	284,839	303,482	339,370	270,077	244,263	373,532	261,386	3,365,767
2019	366,019	366,720	261,255	150,299	311,896	264,116	275,335	237,117	203,749	366,641	246,686	3,049,833
Average Annual Production (years 2014–2019)												3,188,775

== See also ==
- Tehachapi Wind Resource Area
- Wind power in California
- Wind power in the United States
- Ivanpah Solar Power Facility
