= Altamont Pass wind farm =

Wind farm in California, United States

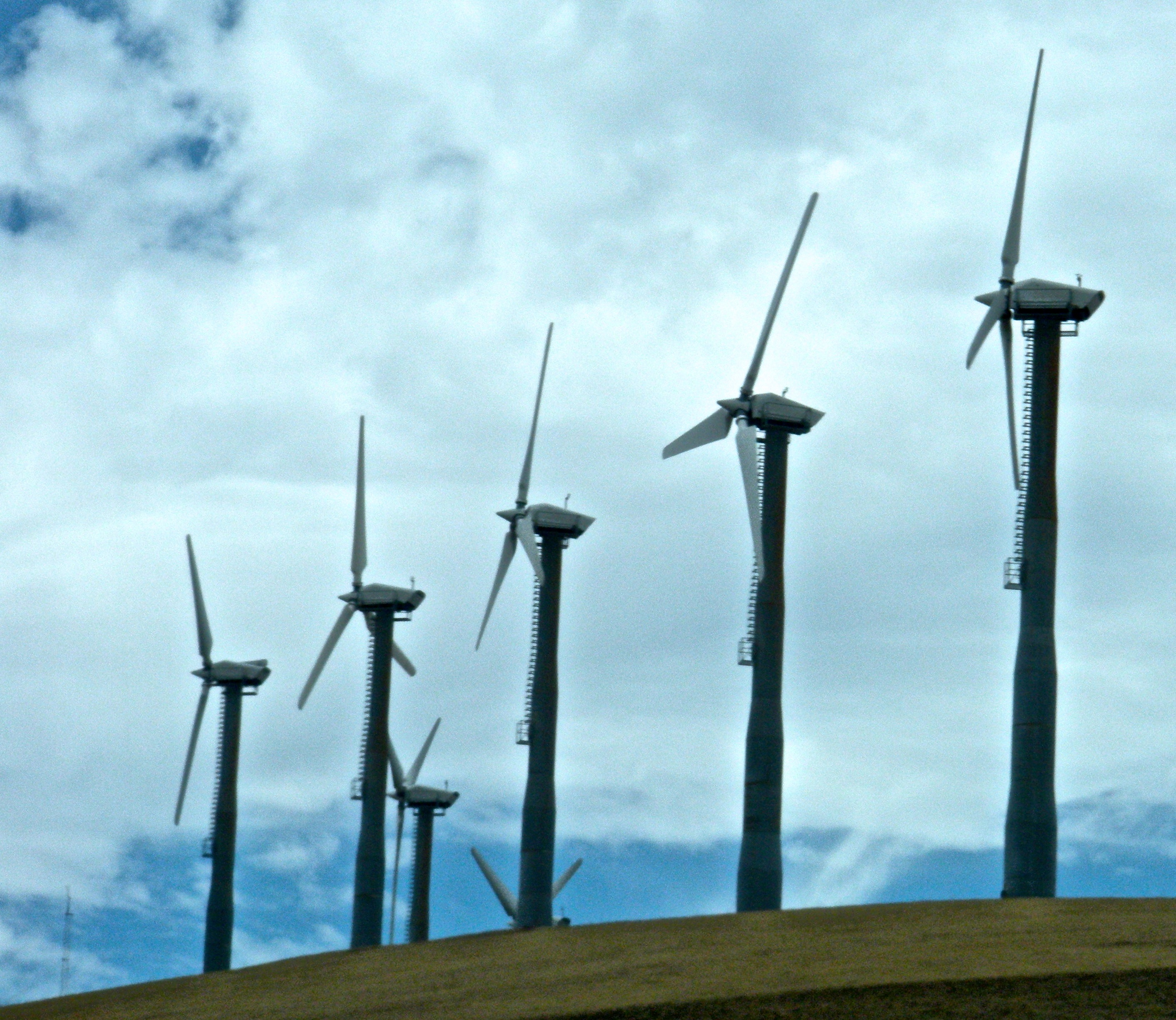
- Turbines near Livermore, California in 2009
- Country: United States
- Location: Altamont Pass, Alameda County, California
- Coordinates: 37°43′57″N 121°39′9″W
- Status: Operational
- Commission date: 1981

Wind farm
- Type: Onshore

Power generation
- Units operational: 4930
- Nameplate capacity: 576 MW
- Annual net output: 1.1 TWh

External links
- Commons: Related media on Commons

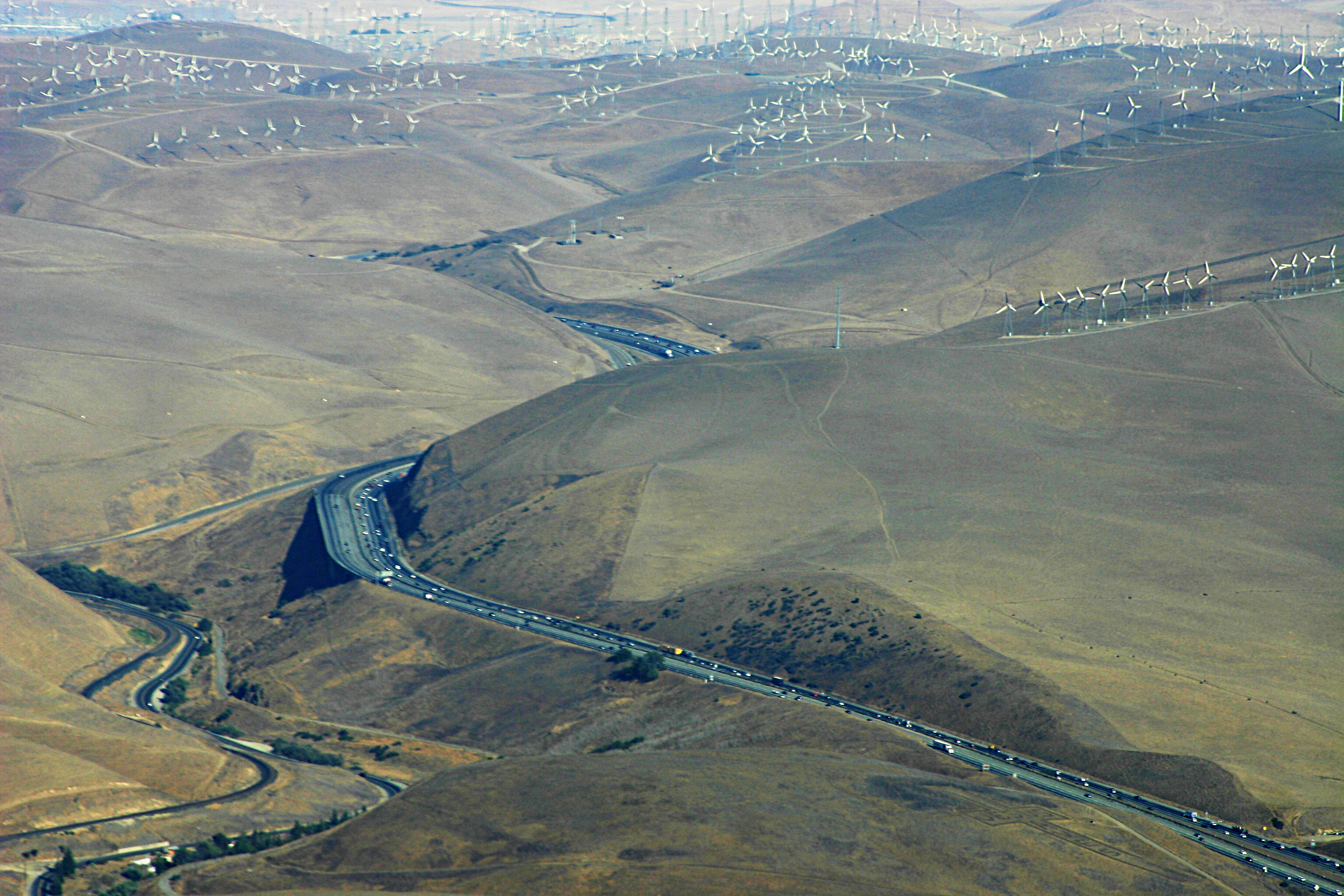
Wind turbines dot the landscape as Interstate 580 winds through Altamont Pass

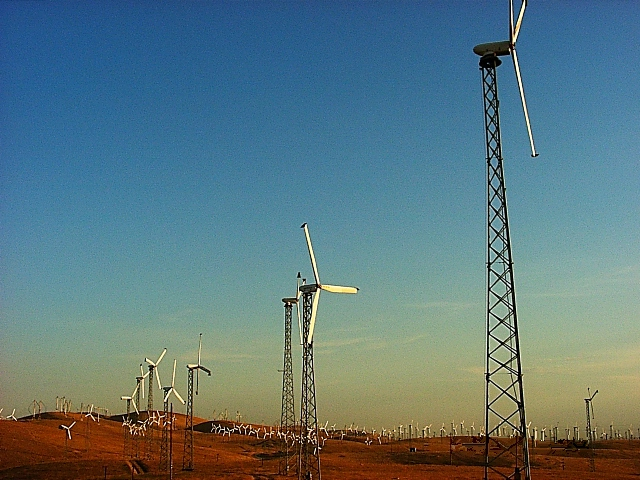
Older wind turbines in 2003

The Altamont Pass wind farm is located in the Altamont Pass of the Diablo Range in Northern California. It is one of the earliest wind farms in the United States. The first wind turbines were placed on the Altamont in the early 1980s by Fayette Manufacturing Corporation, on land owned by cattle rancher Joe Jess. The wind farm is composed of 4,930 relatively small wind turbines of various types, making it at one time the largest wind farm in the world in terms of capacity.

Altamont Pass is still one of the largest concentration of wind turbines in the world, with a capacity of 576 megawatts (MW), producing about 125 MW on average and 1.1 terawatt-hours (TWh) yearly. They were installed after the 1970s energy crisis in response to favorable tax policies for investors.

== In the media ==
When the first windfarms appeared in 1981, on the Altamont hills alongside the Altamont Pass portion of the I-580 freeway, the appearance of the modern windmill generated media excitement and public interest. This portion of the freeway was an increasingly used corridor for growing the bedroom communities of Tracy, Lodi and Modesto serving the Bay Area of California (Oakland, San Francisco and Pleasanton). Daily commuters crowded past the otherwise barren cattle ranches for several hours each day.

By 1985, the Altamont Pass was crowded with over 26 different windfarms. The increased visibility from the nearby I-580 freeway, which had once sparked the media and community's interest, was now widely regarded as a growing eyesore. Successful windfarms at the Altamont Pass encouraged the development of further industrial wind areas in southern California. These windfarms, in the Tehachapi Pass, led to wider recognition, after windmills played a role as a prominent backdrop in several feature films of the mid- and late 1980s, including the 1985 film based on the Bret Easton Ellis novel Less than Zero, featuring Andrew McCarthy and Robert Downey, Jr.

== Environmental effects ==
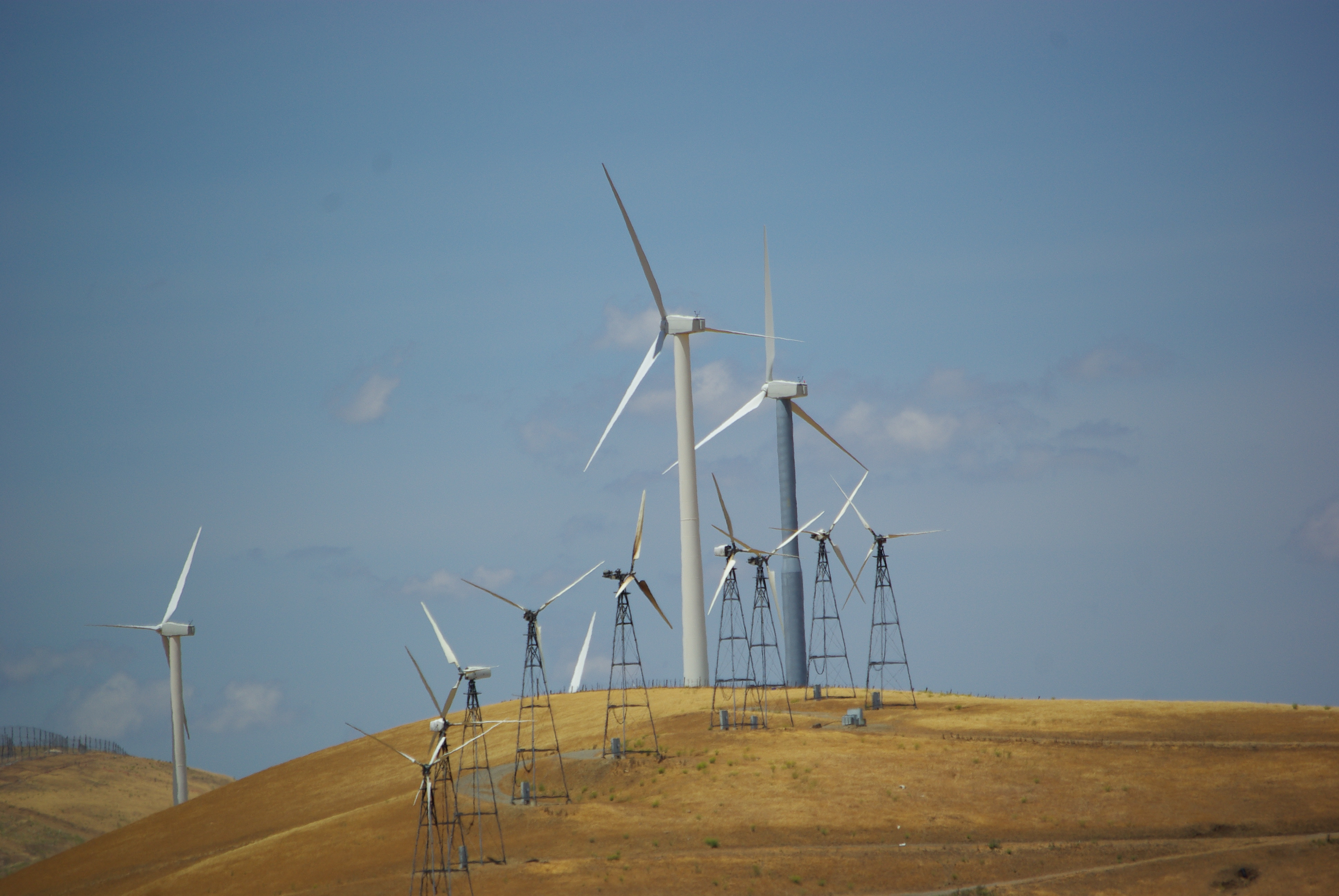
Multiple different turbine types coexisting in 2008

Modern wind turbines and nuclear power plants kill about 0.3 to 0.4 birds per GWh generated, without climate change effects, in comparison with 5.18 birds per GWh with fossil fuels power plants. However, the small turbines used at Altamont in 2007 were dangerous to various raptors that hunt California ground squirrels in the area. In that year, 1,300 raptors were killed annually, among them 70 federally protected golden eagles. In total, 4,700 birds were killed annually.

The effects of the Altamont Pass wind farm on wildlife were exacerbated by its proximity to bird migration routes, its craggy landscape ideal for birds of prey, and its predominantly outdated turbine designs (as of 2013). As of 2013 it takes 15-34 Altamont Pass turbines to produce the same amount of electricity as one modern turbine. These outdated turbines are set 60-80 feet tall, the same height as bird flight paths.

Considered largely obsolete, these numerous small turbines are as of 2009 being gradually replaced with much larger and more cost-effective units. The larger units rotate at a much lower angular frequency to the previous turbines, and, being elevated higher, are less hazardous to the local wildlife, according to a report done for the Bonneville Power Administration.

As of 2010, a settlement has been reached between the Audubon Society, Californians for Renewable Energy and NextEra Energy Resources, who operate some 5,000 turbines in the area. Nearly half of the smaller turbines will be replaced by newer, more bird-friendly models. The project was expected to be complete by 2015 and included $2.5 million for raptor habitat restoration.

== Wind farms ==
The Altamont Pass Wind Farm is now composed of five constituent wind farms. The Golden Hills Wind Farm is the largest constituent wind farm, as well as being the only one located south of Altamont Pass.

Operational wind farms as of February 2020
Name	Capacity (MW)	Owner	Commissioned	Ref
Buena Vista Energy	38	Leeward Asset Management, LLC	December 2006	
Diablo Winds	18	GlidePath Power Operations, LLC	January 2005	
Golden Hills	86	Golden Hills Wind, LLC	December 2015	
Golden Hills North	46	Golden Hills Interconnection Wind, LLC	October 2017	
Vasco Winds	78.2	Vasco Winds, LLC	December 2011	

=== Repowering ===
In 2015, NextEra – which owns some of the 100kW Kenetech/US Windpower older turbines installed during the 1980s – agreed to remove the machines and replace them with 48 new model wind turbines. A power purchase agreement has been completed to power the Googleplex office complex in nearby Mountain View, California. The process of removing old wind turbines and replacing them with newer machines is called repowering.

A portion of the wind energy center is being dismantled as of 2016. Altamont Winds Inc (AWI)'s 83MW of 100 kW Kenetech turbines are being taken down. These are older models with lattice towers. It has been proposed to replace them with 27 turbines with rated capacity of 2.1MW each (56.7MW total).

The Scott Haggerty wind farm replaced 569 100-kW turbines with 23 modern turbines in 2021.

== See also ==
- List of power stations in California
- Wind power in California
- Wind power in the United States
