= Hope for the Hills =

Non-profit grassroots organization

Hope For The Hills (HFTH) is a non-profit grassroots organization based in Chino Hills, California, USA. It is protesting a 5-mile segment of 500kV overhead transmission lines that occupy a 150-foot right of way through a residential area in Chino Hills. The segment is part of the Tehachapi Renewable Transmission Project (TRTP). On July 11, 2013 Hope for the Hills won its long fight when the California Public Utilities Commission voted to put the lines underground.

== TRTP overview ==
The TRTP is a 187-mile transmission project developed by Southern California Edison (SCE) that promises to bring up to 4,500 megawatts of renewable energy from windfarms in Kern County to substations in Los Angeles County and San Benadino County. On December 17, 2009, the California Public Utility Commission (CPUC) approved segment 8A through the city of Chino Hills, calling it the "Environmentally Superior Route.". The city of Chino Hills spent almost $2.4 million to fight the decision in the Superior Court and the State Court of Appeals. The court actions was unsuccessful. SCE erected the first tubular steel tower in Chino Hills in May 2011. In October 2011, the CPUC ordered SCE not to string the transmission lines until further notice. Construction on the Chino Hills segment stopped. In November 2011, CPUC ordered Southern California Edison to provide alternatives to TRTP. Private negotiations between the City of Chino Hills and SCE concluded that SCE should prepare further studies of the cost, timing, and environment impacts of undergrounding the line. SCE's formal testimony is due February 28, 2013.

== HFTH organization ==
Since 2009, Hope for the Hills has organized numerous protests at CPUC hearings, city board sessions, and SCE meetings and events. Bob Goodwin serves as the current President.

The group has been mentioned in the LA Times, and discussed in the Inland Valley Daily Bulletin and NBC Los Angeles. The group's YouTube video, "Pack it up, Get it Out" was featured by NBC.

CalWatchdog described the CPUC ruling that SCE should find alternatives to the power lines as a "landmark case in citizen activism" and credited HFTH for the victory.

According to HFTH, no other transmission line in the United States uses such a narrow right of way in a seismically active residential community for a 500kV line. The 2008 Chino Hills earthquake was an example of an event with sufficient intensity to cause significant damage. HFTH maintains that this line is detrimental to the safety, health, aesthetics, and property values of their community.

== CPUC and TRTP ==
The California Public Utilities Commission (CPUC) is a government-run organization that regulates privately owned electric, natural gas, telecommunications, water, railroad, rail transit, and passenger transportation companies. They are the agency that exclusively made the decision to allow Southern California Edison (SCE) to begin building their Tehachapi Renewable Transmission Project (TRTP). On December 17, 2009, the CPUC, in a press release, announced that they had approved the construction of Segments 4–11 of TRTP in order to increase access to new renewable energy. Prior to this decision, in March 2007, the CPUC had already approved Segments 1–3 of TRTP, and at the time of this press release, those segments were nearly finished and they planned to be fully energized by the end of the year. Today, Segments 1, 2, 3a, and 3b are complete and energized. And with the approval of the CPUC, SCE began erecting towers for Segments 4–11.

On November 10, 2011, the CPUC ordered Edison to stop the construction of transmission lines through Chino Hills. The CPUC deemed this stop necessary in order to preserve the decision pending on the Chino Hills Application for Rehearing and a Motion for Partial Stay. This stop-work was to be in effect until there was a resolution to the Application for Rehearing or until the CPUC decided it was fit for Edison to resume construction. In addition, the President of the CPUC, Michael R. Peevey, requested that SCE create a list of alternatives to their project's current design and route. In response to this ruling, Commissioner Timothy Alan Simon stated, “In my visit to Chino Hills, it was clear that the local impact issues of the transmission line warrant a review by this Commission.”.

On May 3, 2012, settlement negotiation began between SCE and the city of Chino Hills on the routing of the 500k-volt power line. These negotiations included the potential undergrounding of these power lines beneath the existing right of way (public throughway) that Edison has in the city. The CPUC hoped that the potential undergrounding would produce an outcome that satisfied both parties.

In its most recent press release regarding the Tehachapi Renewable Transmission Project, which occurred on July 2, 2012, the CPUC ordered SCE to prepare a testimony based on preliminary studies of undergrounding options of the transmission lines running through Chino Hills; the report needs to be given to the CPUC by February 28, 2013. This testimony will provide a detailed description on the estimated costs and construction timeline for undergrounding the lines in Chino Hills. The previous stop on SCE construction in Chino Hills will remain in effect until the CPUC considers these undergrounding options and makes its final decision.
