= Tehachapi Pass =

Route in the Transverse Ranges

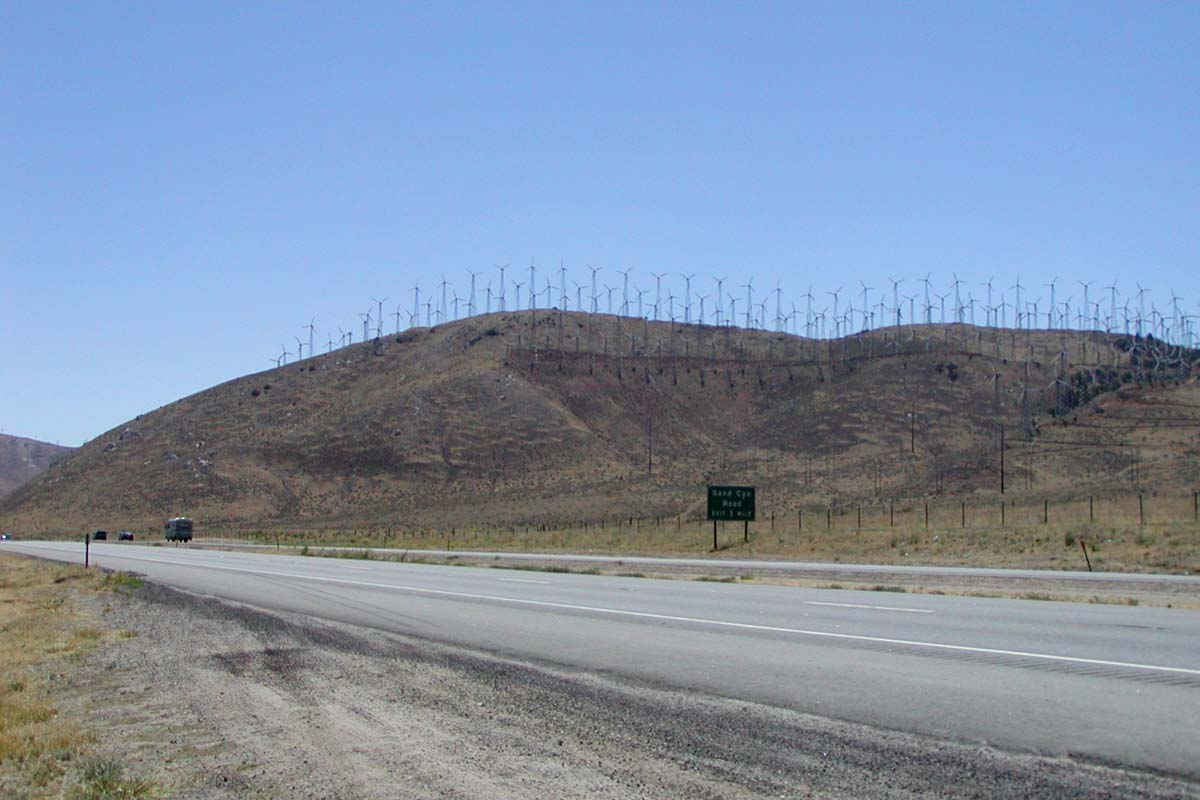
- The Tehachapi Pass Wind Farm, as seen from California State Route 58

- Location within southern California Location within California
- Elevation: 3,771 feet (1,149 m)
- Traversed by: SR 58; Union Pacific Railroad; Future California High-Speed Rail

Third Approach
- Location: Kern County, California
- Range: Tehachapi Mountains / Sierra Nevada
- Coordinates: 35°06′08″N 118°16′58″W

Tehachapi Pass (Note: (Kawaiisu: Tihachipia, meaning "hard climb")) is a mountain pass crossing the Tehachapi Mountains in Kern County, California. Traditionally, the pass marks the northeast end of the Tehachapis and the south end of the Sierra Nevada range.

The route is a principal connector between the San Joaquin Valley and the Mojave Desert. The Native American Kitanemuk people used the pass as a trade route before the American settlement of the region in the 19th century. The main line of the former Southern Pacific Railroad opened though the pass in 1876. The tracks are now owned by the Union Pacific Railroad and shared with BNSF Railway as the Mojave Subdivision. U.S. Route 466 was built in the 1930s, and the road is now State Route 58. The pass is also the route of the planned California High-Speed Rail line.

The Tehachapi Mountains are also crossed by Tejon Pass at the southwest end of the range.

== Name ==
The meaning of the name Tehachapi Pass is often a source of confusion. Technically, i.e., as noted on USGS topographic maps, the name refers to the narrowest part of the canyon on the eastern approach to the summit, as at San Gorgonio Pass, where the elevation is about 3,771 feet (1,149 m).

The actual high point is just east of the town of Tehachapi, at an elevation of 4,031 feet (1,229 m), on the railroad next to Tehachapi Boulevard. The highway sign refers to this location as Tehachapi Summit. The term Tehachapi Pass is routinely used to refer to both this location and the approaches on either side.

== Features ==
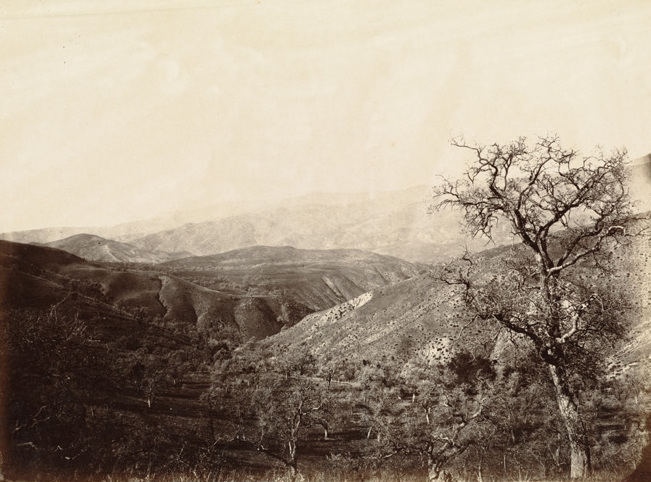
The Tehachapi Mountains and Tehachapi Pass in 1869

The mountain pass acts as a venturi effect to air moving between ocean and desert, increasing wind speed.

The area east and south of the pass is home to the Tehachapi Pass Wind Farm, and to the west is Alta Wind Energy Center, some of California's larger wind farms.

The railroad landmark known as the Tehachapi Loop is about 18 miles (29 km) west of the summit. The pass is also a proposed route for the California High-Speed Rail line between Palmdale and Bakersfield.

== See also ==
- Tehachapi Renewable Transmission Project
