= Altamont Pass =

Mountain pass through the Diablo Range in Northern California

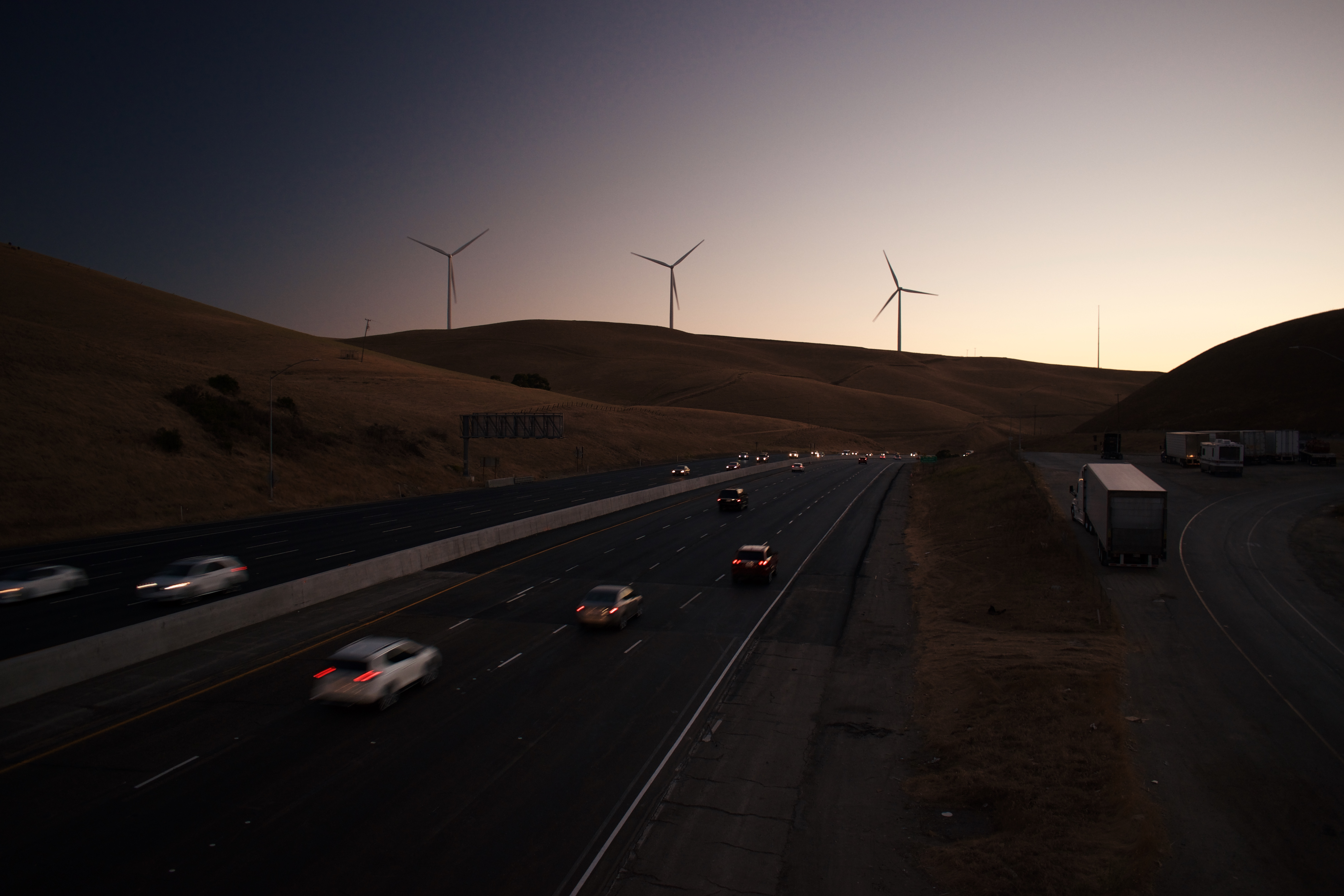
- Wind turbines at Altamont Pass near Livermore, California
- Interactive map of Altamont Pass
- Elevation: 741 feet (226 m)
- Traversed by: Altamont Pass Road, Union Pacific Railroad

Third Approach
- Location: Alameda County, California, between the Livermore and San Joaquin valleys
- Range: Diablo Range
- Coordinates: 37°44′45″N 121°39′30″W
- Topo map: Altamont

New Altamont Pass
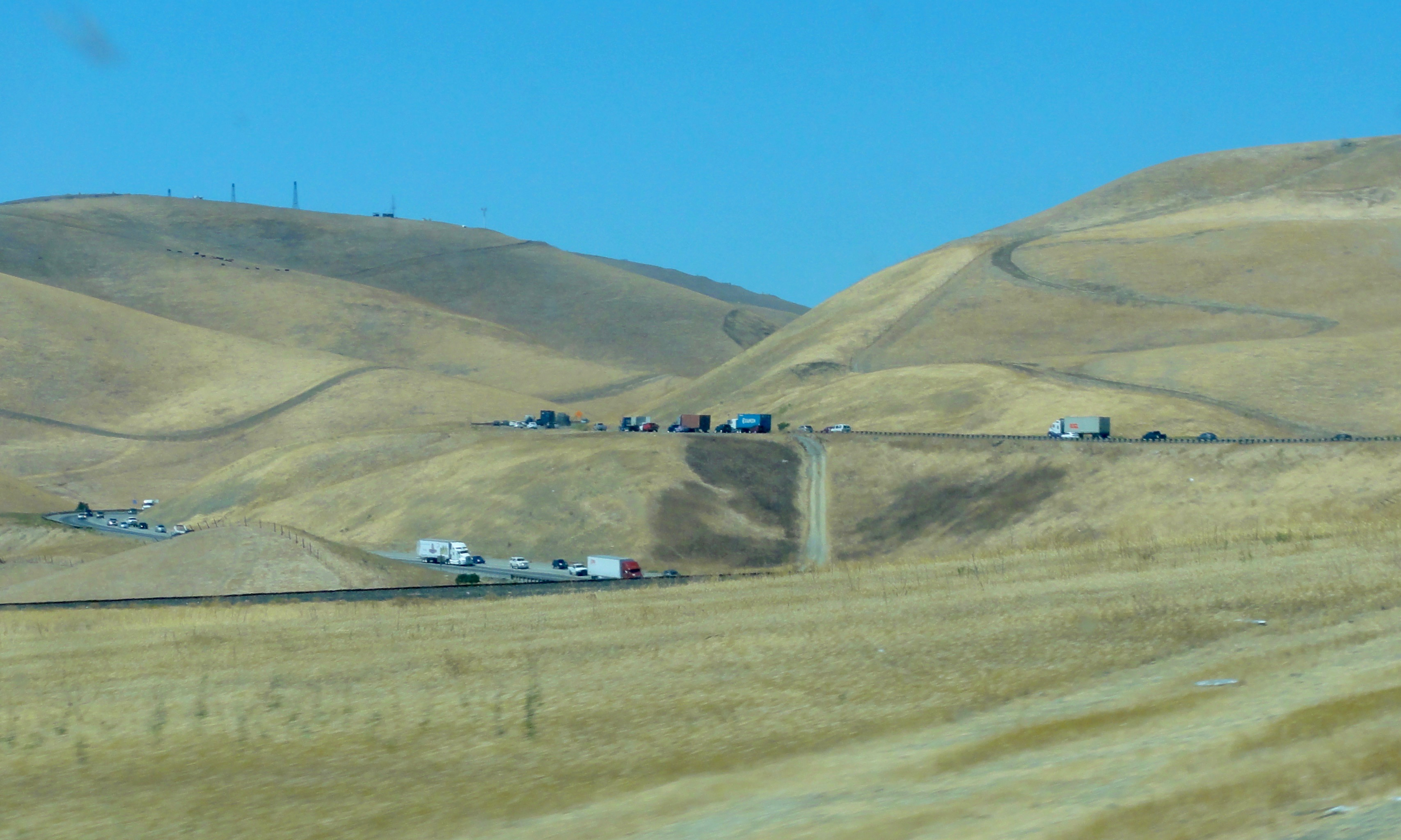
- View from westbound I-580 of Altamont Pass.
- Interactive map of New Altamont Pass
- Elevation: 1,009 feet (308 m)
- Traversed by: I-580

Third Approach
- Location: Alameda County, California, between the Livermore and San Joaquin valleys
- Range: Diablo Range
- Coordinates: 37°43′9″N 121°39′33″W
- Topo map: Altamont

Altamont Pass, formerly Livermore Pass, is a low mountain pass in the Diablo Range of Northern California between Livermore in the Livermore Valley and Tracy in the San Joaquin Valley. The name is actually applied to two distinct but nearby crossings of the range. The lower of the two, at an elevation of 741 ft (226 m), carries two railroad rights-of-way (ROWs) and Altamont Pass Road, part of the old Lincoln Highway and the original alignment of US 50 before it was bypassed in 1937. The bypass route travels over the higher summit, at 1,009 ft (308 m), and now carries Interstate 580, a major regional highway heavily congested by Central Valley suburbanization.

Of the two railroad lines through the old pass, one is still in use: the ex-Western Pacific line built in 1908 over the pass, which is sometimes known as the Altamont Corridor, now owned by Union Pacific. It carries freight trains as well as the Altamont Corridor Express, which gives its occasional name (ACE) and operates between Stockton, Livermore, Pleasanton, Fremont, and San Jose. The other and older right-of-way was the line built in 1869 with a 1,200-foot-long (370 m) summit tunnel by the original Western Pacific Railroad (1862–1870) as part of the transcontinental railroad. After 1879, when a sea level ferry crossing at the Carquinez Strait replaced the 1869 route, it remained in use for other purposes by the Southern Pacific. In 1984 it was abandoned and deeded to Alameda County by Southern Pacific Railroad in favor of trackage rights on the aforementioned ex-Western Pacific line.

From 1966 to 2008, the Altamont Pass area was home to the Altamont Speedway, which became famous as the site of the 1969 Altamont Free Concert, a large outdoor concert featuring The Rolling Stones and marred by violence. The pass is also known for the Altamont Pass Wind Farm, one of the largest concentrations of wind turbines in the world.

== History ==
From the time of the California Gold Rush, what is now Altamont Pass was called Livermore's Pass after Robert Livermore, the owner of the Rancho Las Positas and a way station near the pass. After the transcontinental railroad was built through the pass by Chinese laborers in 1869, Altamont, formerly The Summit, became a critical stopping point where helper engines pushed heavy trains over the steep grades of the pass.

A narrow road, the Altamont Pass Road (once called the Stockton Road), was an early stagecoach route and formed part of the transcontinental Lincoln Highway. In 1938, Highway 50, a four lane freeway (now called Interstate 580) was built through Altamont Pass, replacing the two-lane Altamont Pass Road and bypassing Altamont. Four westbound lanes were later constructed in 1970.

== Gallery ==
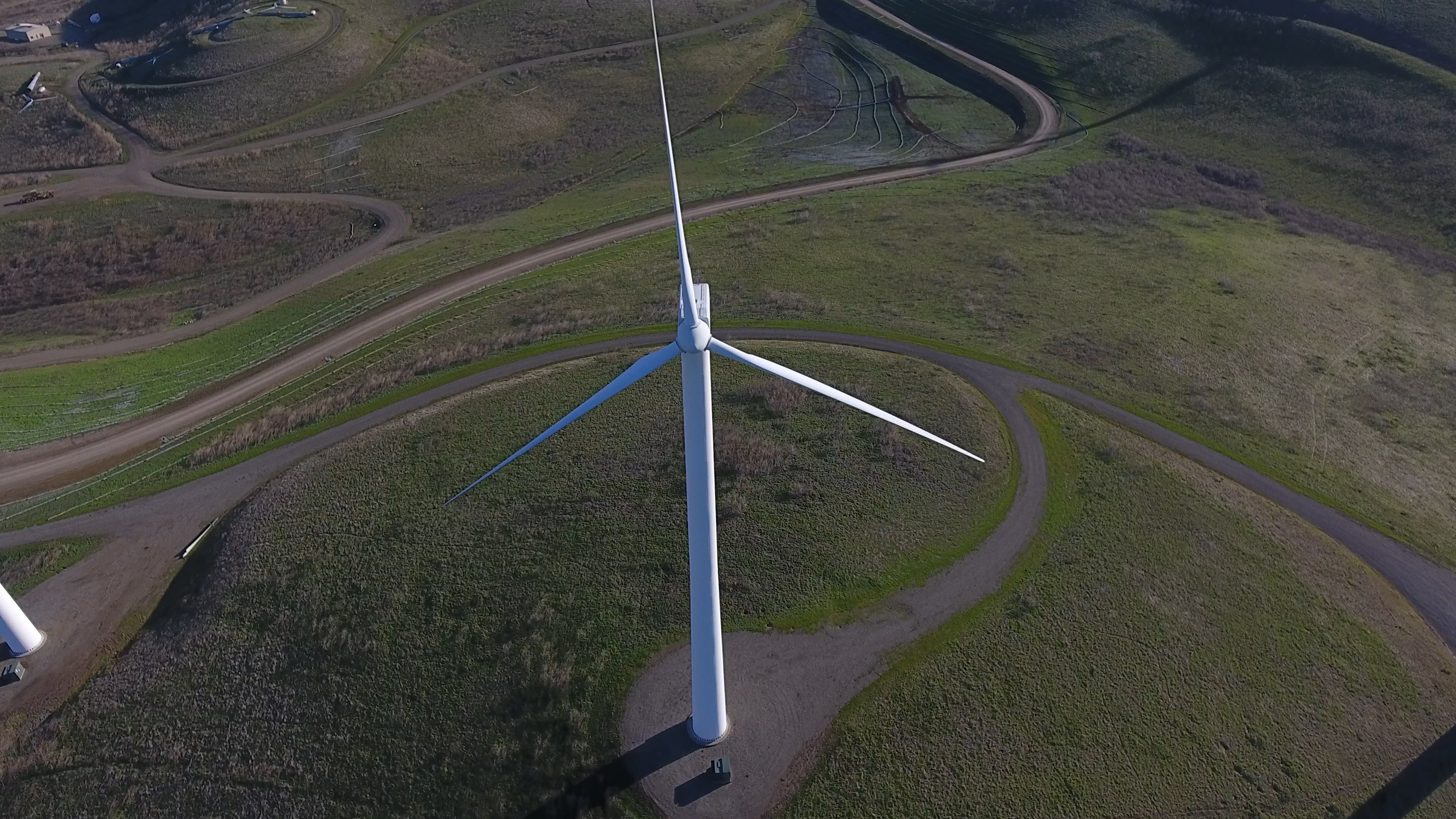
New wind turbine at the Altamont Pass Wind Farm

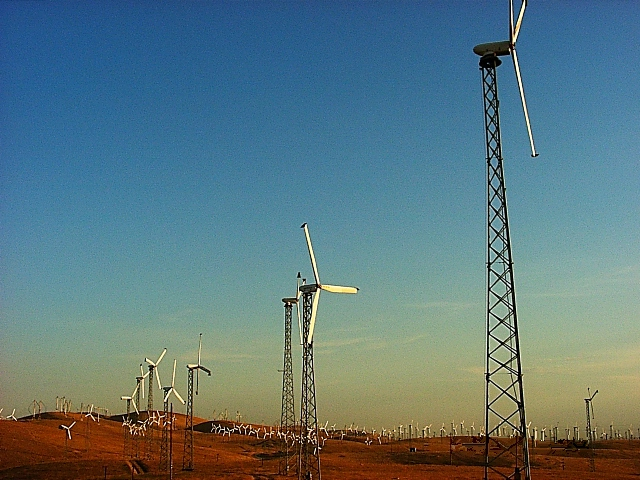
Older wind turbines, part of the Altamont Pass Wind Farm.

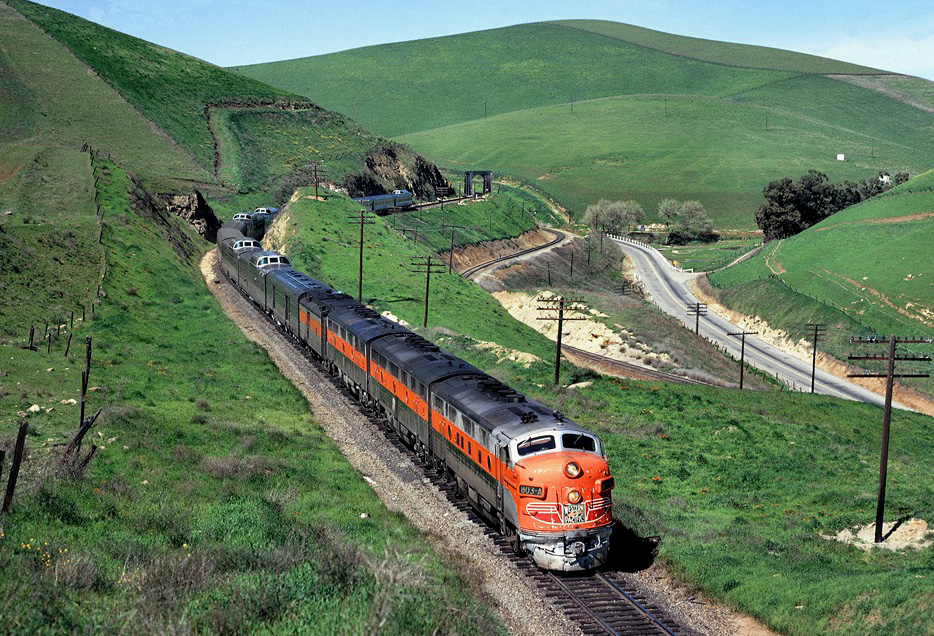
Eastbound California Zephyr just east of Altamont Pass, February 1970.

== See also ==
- Altamont Corridor Express
- Altamont Pass Wind Farm
- Mountain House, California
- Valley Link
- Tracy
- Alameda County, California
