= Tehachapi Renewable Transmission Project =

Southern California Edison high voltage line work

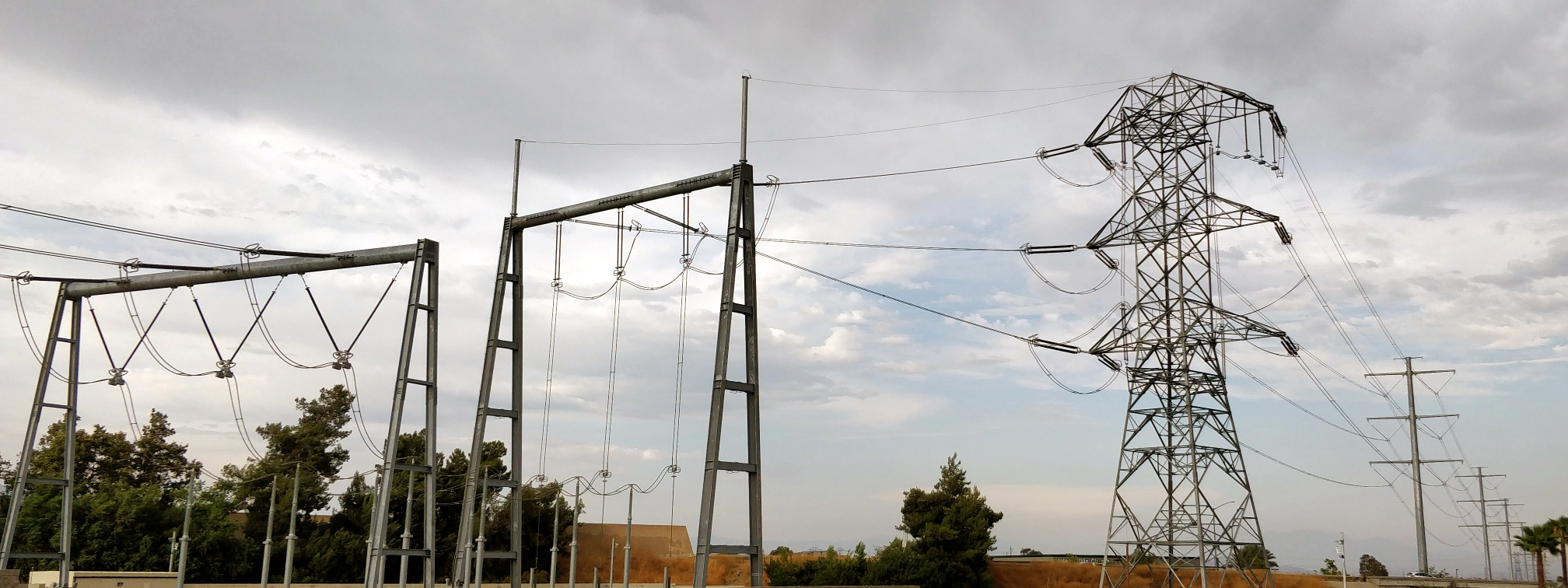
The Tehachapi Renewable Transmission Project 500kV eastern transition station in Chino Hills, California.

The Tehachapi Renewable Transmission Project is a project involving the construction of approximately 173 miles (278 km) of new and upgraded high-voltage transmission lines for transmission of electricity from wind farms and other generating units in southeastern Kern County, California to Los Angeles County and San Bernardino County.

The project, developed and operated by Southern California Edison, commenced construction on March 7, 2008 and was completed and placed in operation in December 2016. With a capacity of 4,500 megawatts, the transmission system can provide power for an estimated 3 million homes.

It passes through sections of the Tehachapi Mountains, Sierra Pelona Mountains, and Antelope Valley.

State laws requiring SCE to provide at least 33% of its power service from renewable sources by 2020 is driving the project. SCE had no interest in owning the land that the project is on, but needed to construct the transmission system nonetheless to meet the renewable source laws.

== See also ==
- Hope for the Hills
- List of wind farms in the United States
- Tehachapi Wind Resource Area
