= Maria Elena =

Maria Elena or María Elena is the name of:

== People ==
- María Elena Álvarez Bernal, Mexican politician
- María Elena Álvarez-Buylla Roces, Mexican scientist
- María Elena Arpón, Spanish actress
- María Elena Avila, American entrepreneur, philanthropist and civic leader
- María Elena Barrera, Mexican politician
- María Elena Batista, Puerto Rican sports area administrator
- Maria Elena Berini, Roman Catholic missionary
- Maria Elena Boschi, Italian politician
- Maria Elena Bottazzi, Honduran microbiologist
- Maria E. Brewer, American diplomat
- María Elena Calle, Ecuadorian marathon runner
- Maria Elena Camerin, Italian tennis player
- María Elena Cano Ayala, Mexican politician
- María Elena Carballo, Costa Rican politician and government minister
- María Elena Carrera, Chilean politician
- María Elena Caso, Mexican marine biologist
- María Elena Casuccio, Argentine politician
- María Elena Chapa, Mexican politician
- María Elena Chávez Palacios, Mexican politician
- María Elena Delgado, Mexican sculptor
- María Elena Durazo, American politician
- María Elena Espeso, Spanish marathon runner
- Maria Elena Foronda Farro, Peruvian sociologist and environmentalist
- María Elena Galiano, Argentine arachnologist
- María Elena Giusti, Venezuelan synchronised swimmer
- María Elena González, American artist
- María Elena González Mederos, Cuban-American government statistician, poetry translator and human rights activist
- María Elena Gutiérrez, Peruvian footballer
- María Elena Holly, Puerto Rican businesswoman; widow of Buddy Holly
- Maria Elena Kyriakou, Cypriot singer
- Maria-Elena Laas, American actress of Puerto Rican descent
- Maria Elena Lagomasino, American businesswoman
- Maria Elena Lorenzo, owner of Afro-Mexican restaurant in Los Angeles
- María Elena Lucas, Chicana activist
- María Elena Marqués, Mexican actress and singer
- Maria Elena Martinez, historian of colonial Mexico
- María Elena Maseras, Spanish politician
- María Elena Medina-Mora Icaza, Mexican psychologist and researcher
- María Elena Moyano, Peruvian activist
- María Elena Noriega Blanco, Mexican politician
- María Elena Oddone, Argentine women's rights activist
- María Elena Orantes López, Mexican politician
- Maria-Elena Papasotiriou, American figure skater
- María Elena Pérez de Tejada, Mexican politician
- María Elena Ramírez, Mexican gymnast
- María Elena Romero, Mexican diver
- María Elena Salinas, American journalist
- María Elena Sarría, Cuban athlete
- María Elena Swett, Chilean actress
- María Elena Torres Baltazar, Mexican politician
- Maria-Elena Torres-Padilla, biologist
- Maria Elena Ubina, American squash player
- María Elena Velasco, Mexican actress, singer, and director
- María Elena Walsh, Argentine author and songwriter
- María Elena Zamora, Mexican politician
- Maria Elena Zavala, American plant biologist

== Geography ==
- María Elena, Chile, town in Chile
  - María Elena Solar Power Plant
  - María Elena Airport, former airstrip

== Other ==
- "María Elena" (song), a Spanish-language song
- María Elena (film), a 1936 Mexican film
- Maria Elena (character), in Vicky Cristina Barcelona
