= List of energy storage power plants =

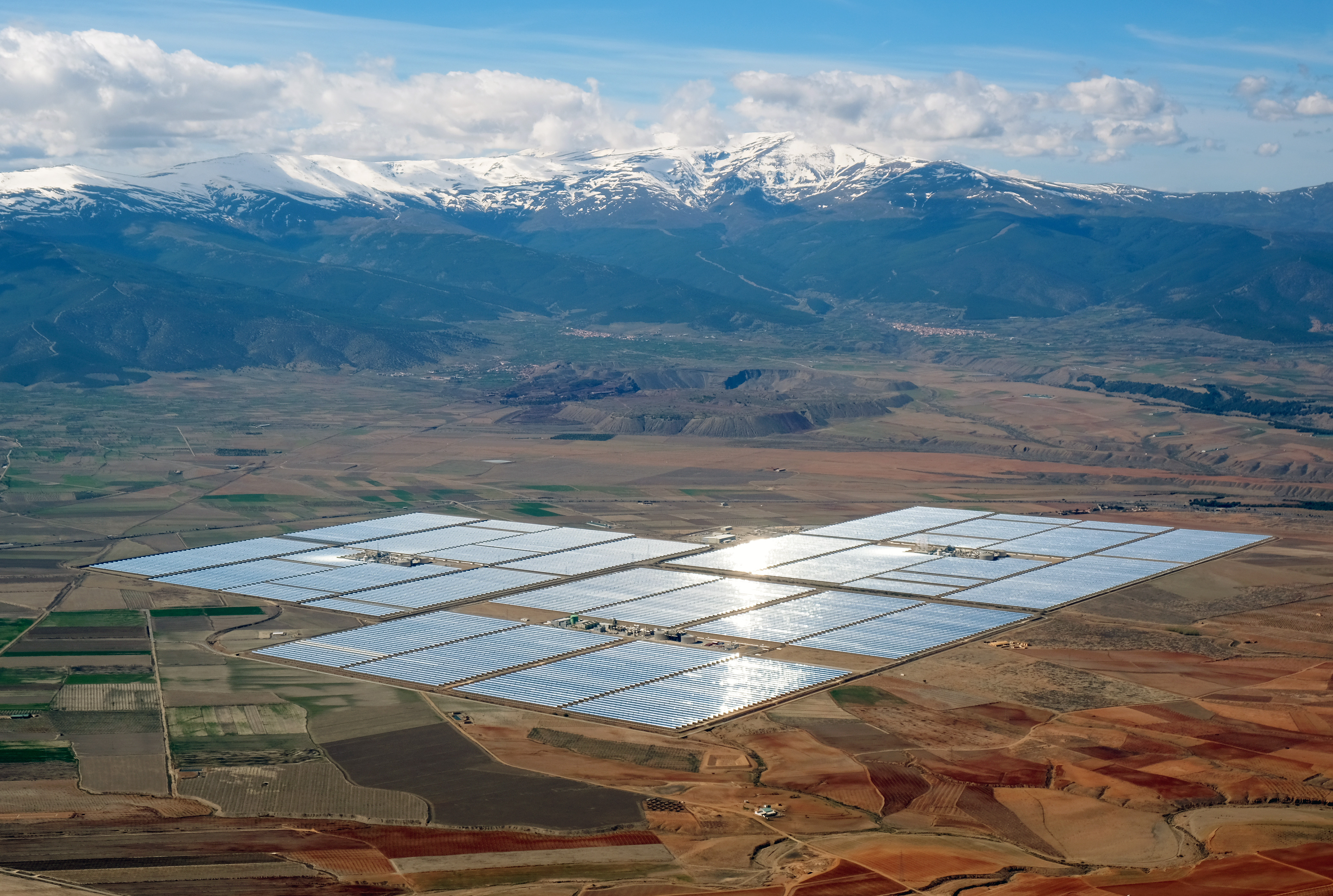
The 150 MW Andasol solar power station is a commercial parabolic trough solar thermal power plant, located in Spain. The Andasol plant uses tanks of molten salt to store captured solar energy so that it can continue generating electricity when the sun is not shining.

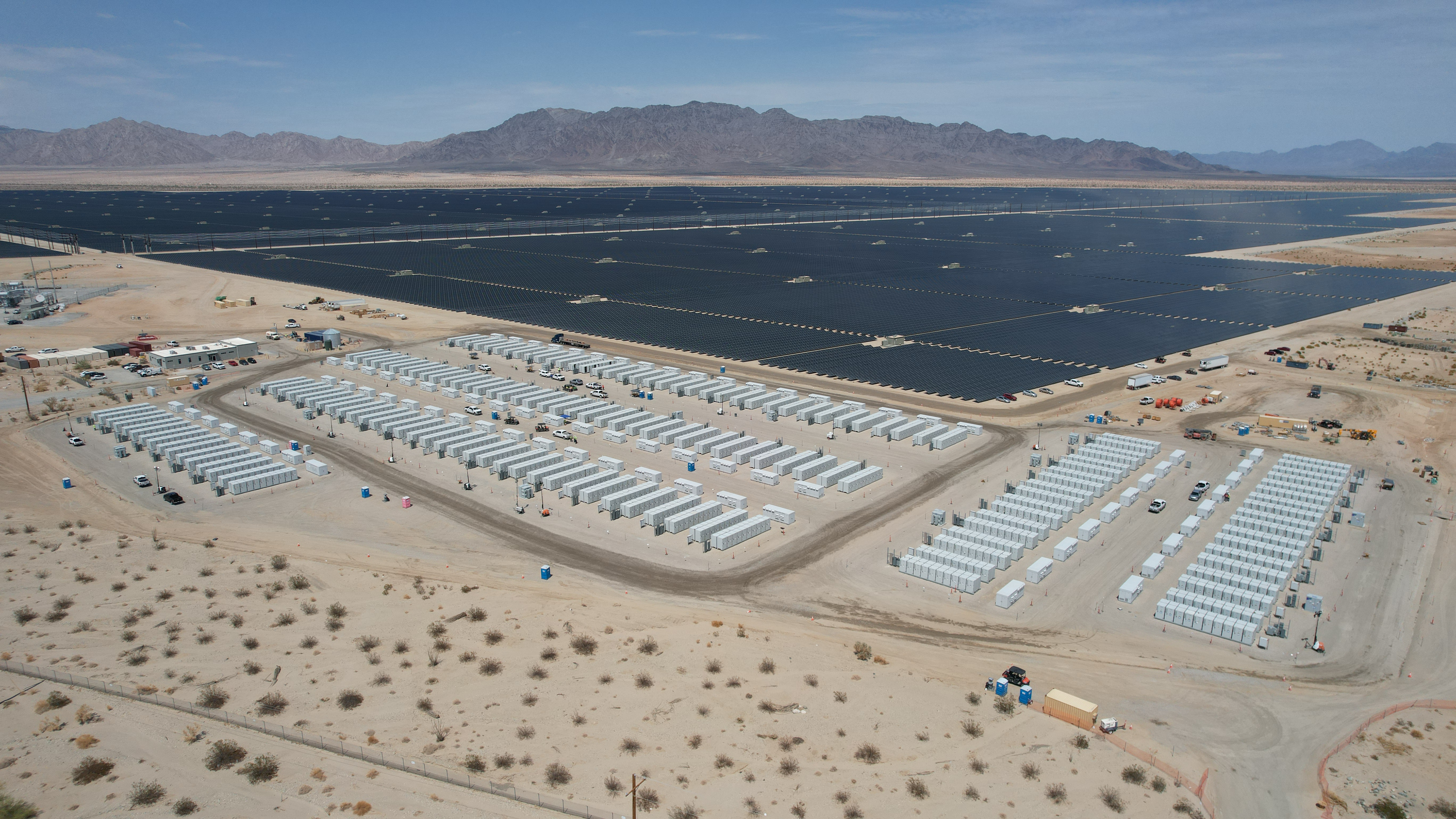
Battery energy storage system paired with solar farm (Desert Sunlight Solar Farm)

This is a list of energy storage power plants worldwide, other than pumped hydro storage. Many individual energy storage plants augment electrical grids by capturing excess electrical energy during periods of low demand and storing it in other forms until needed on an electrical grid. The energy is later converted back to its electrical form and returned to the grid as needed.

Most of the world's grid energy storage by capacity is in the form of pumped-storage hydroelectricity, which is covered in List of pumped-storage hydroelectric power stations. This article list plants using all other forms of energy storage.

Another energy storage method is the consumption of surplus or low-cost energy (typically during night time) for conversion into resources such as hot water, cool water or ice, which is then used for heating or cooling at other times when electricity is in higher demand and at greater cost per kilowatt hour (kWh). Such thermal energy storage is often employed at end-user sites such as large buildings, and also as part of district heating, thus shifting energy consumption to other times for better balancing of supply and demand.

For a list of systems and forms of energy storage see energy storage and grid energy storage.

== Largest energy storage plants ==
Table is by default sorted by operational storage capacity in MWh. Minimum capacity for inclusion is either 100 MWh or 100 MW, with a minimum of 1 hour of storage.

Energy storage power plants of at least 100 MW / 100 MWh
Name	Type	Capacity			Country	Location	Year	Description
Name	Type	MWh	MW	hrs	Country	Location	Year	Description
Edwards & Sanborn Solar and Energy Storage Project	Battery	3,287	—	—	United States	Kern County, California	2024	Solar-plus-storage project reported as fully online in January 2024, with 3,287 MWh of battery storage.
Ouarzazate Solar Power Station	Thermal storage, molten salt	3,005	510	3 / 7 / 7.5	Morocco	Ouarzazate	2018	World's largest concentrated solar power plant with molten salt storage built in 3 phases - 160 MW phase 1 with 3 hours heat storage, 200 MW phase 2 with 7 hours heat storage and 150 MW phase 3 with 7.5 hours heat storage.
Nova Power Bank	Battery	2,720	680	4	United States	Menifee, California	2024	Phase I-IV: 620 MW in 2024, Phase V: 60 MW in 2025
McIntosh CAES Plant	Compressed air storage, in-ground natural gas combustion	2,860	110	26	United States	Alabama, McIntosh	1991	2nd commercial CAES plant. Stores compressed air in a salt cavern of 220 feet (67 m) diameter, with ten million cubic foot total volume. The cavern is pressurized to 1,100 psi, and it is discharged down to 650 psi. During discharge, 340 pounds per second of air flow out of the cavern. The plant also utilizes nuclear-sourced night-time power for compression and then produces peak power during the day by releasing the compressed air into a 110-MW gas-fired combustion turbine. The turbine unit also makes use of an air-to-air heat exchanger to preheat air from the cavern with waste heat from the turbine. The waste heat recovery system reduces fuel usage by roughly 25%. The system is fully operational within 15 minutes, uses a third of the fuel required for a fuel-only generating system, and can operate efficiently at low loads. The project is used for peak shaving.
Collie Battery	Battery	2,240	560	4	Australia	Collie, Western Australia	2024	Phase 1 commissioned in 2024, Phase 2 in 2025
Cerro Dominador Solar Thermal Plant	Thermal storage, molten salt	1,925	110	17.5	Chile	Antofagasta	2021	A concentrated solar power plant with 17.5 hours molten salt storage
Solana Generating Station	Thermal storage, molten salt	1,680	280	6	United States	Arizona, Gila Bend	2013	Completed in 2013, the parabolic trough solar plant, with 6 hours storage by molten salt, is located near Gila Bend, Arizona. At the time it was the world's largest parabolic trough plant, and the first United States solar plant with thermal storage.
Moss Landing Vistra Battery	Battery, lithium-ion	1,600	400	4	United States	Moss Landing, California	2020	300 MW / 1,200 MWh Phase 1 commissioned in 2020, 100 MW / 400 MWh Phase 2 in 2021
Melbourne Renewable Energy Hub	Battery	1,600	600	2.7	Australia	Plumpton	2025	
Crimson Energy Storage	Battery	1,400	350	4	United States	Riverside County, California	2022	
Waratah Super Battery	Battery, lithium-ion	1,400	700		Australia	New South Wales	2025	Located 25 km south of the retiring Eraring Power Station
Sunlight Storage	Battery	1,380	460	3	United States	Riverside County, California	2022	Paired with 550 MW Desert Sunlight Solar Farm, Phase I commissioned in 2022, Phase II in 2024
Atrisco Energy Storage	Battery	1,200	300	4	United States	Albuquerque, New Mexico	2024	Paired with 364 MW solar project
Extresol Solar Power Station	Thermal storage, molten salt	1,125	150	7.5	Spain	Torre de Miguel Sesmero, Badajoz	2009	A concentrated solar power plant with 7.5 hours molten salt storage
Crescent Dunes Solar Energy Project	Thermal storage, molten salt	1,100	110	10	United States	Tonopah, Nevada	2016	A concentrated solar power plant with 10 hours molten salt storage
Andasol Solar Power Station	Thermal storage, molten salt	1,031	134.7	7.5	Spain	Granada, Guadix	2009	A thermal storage system absorbs part of the daytime heat absorbed by the solar field, heating a molten salt mixture of 60% sodium nitrate and 40% potassium nitrate. The heat is used to drive a turbine-generator when direct sunlight is not available, nearly doubling the available hours of operation. A full thermal reservoir holds 1,010 MWh of heat capability, enough to run the turbine for over seven hours at full load.
Sonoran Solar Energy Center	Battery, lithium-ion	1,000			United States	Buckeye, Arizona	2024	Paired with 260 MW solar project
Sierra Estrella Energy Storage	Battery	1,000	250	4	United States	Arizona	2024	
McCoy Solar Energy Project	Battery, lithium-ion	920	230	4	United States	Blythe, California	2021	Battery storage paired with 250 MW solar project
Manatee Energy Storage Center	Battery	900	409	2.2	United States	Juno Beach, Florida	2021	Paired with existing solar plant
Huntorf CAES Plant	Compressed air storage, in-ground natural gas combustion	870	290	3	Germany	Huntorf, Elsfleth	1978	First commercial CAES plant, operational since 1978, using nuclear-sourced night-time power to compress and inject the air into two caverns of 310,000 m^{3} total volume. The 600 m cavern depth ensures the air's stability through seasonal temperature changes, and guarantees the specified maximum pressure of 100 bar. One cavern is cycled daily; the other serves as backup when the nearby nuclear power plant goes offline.
Desert Peak Energy Storage	Battery	800	400	2	United States	Riverside County, California	2023	650/325 Phase I, 150/75 Phase II
Moss Landing PG&E Elkhorn Battery	Battery, lithium-ion	730	182.5	4	United States	Moss Landing, California	2022	256 Tesla Megapack battery units
Staythorpe BESS	Battery, lithium-ion	720	360	2	United Kingdom	Newark, Nottinghamshire	2027	Construction began in 2025; expected to become operational by mid-2027.
Slate Project	Battery	561	140.25	4	United States	Kings County	2022	Paired with 300 MW solar plant
Rodeo Ranch Energy Storage	Battery	600	300	2	United States	Reeves County, Texas	2023	
Valley Center Battery Storage Project	Battery, lithium-ion	560	140	4	United States	Valley Center, California	2022	
Bokpoort CSP	Thermal storage, molten salt	450	50	9	South Africa	Northern Cape Province, Globershoop	2015	The Bokpoort Concentrated Solar Plant (CSP) Project, being contracted in 2014, comprises a solar field, a power block, a thermal energy storage system and related infrastructure such as grid interconnection and water abstraction and treatment systems. The solar field comprises loops of parabolic trough solar collector assemblies which will collect the heat from the sun. The solar collectors will be capable of heating the heat transfer fluid up to 393 °C. The power block comprises a solar steam generator and a steam turbine delivering 50 MW (net).
Victorian Big Battery	Battery, lithium-ion	450	300	1.5	Australia	Moorabool	2021	
Reid Gardner Battery Energy Storage System	Battery, lithium-ion	440	220	2	United States	Moapa, Nevada	2023	Was the largest BESS project in Nevada upon its completion, utilizing 208 BYD battery units. Built on the site of the former coal-fired Reid Gardner Generating Station.
Alamitos Energy Center	Battery, lithium-ion	400	100	4	United States	Long Beach	2021	
Saticoy BESS	Battery, lithium-ion	400	100	4	United States	Saticoy	2021	
Dalian VFB	Battery, vanadium redox flow	400	100	4	China	Liaoning, Dalian	2022	First phase, second 100MW/400MWh phase under construction. The battery is made up of ten 20MW/80MWh Vanadium Flow Battery (VFB) energy storage systems deployed in Dalian city and connected to the main grid of Liaoning Province which has experienced stress during extreme weather events. This project is approved by China National Energy Administration, and the owner is a JV with the major shareholder being a local utility company, and the minor being Rongke Power.
KaXu Solar One	Thermal storage, molten salt	300	100	3	South Africa	Northern Cape Province, Pofadder	2015	KaXu Solar One is a 100 MW parabolic trough plant. The power station will have a storage capacity of three hours and use molten salt to store heat energy. In the parabolic trough system, the sun's energy is concentrated by parabolically curved, trough-shaped reflectors onto a receiver pipe running along the focal line of the curved surface. This energy heats oil flowing through the pipe, and the heat energy is then used to convert water to steam and generate electricity in a conventional steam generator.
Buzen Substation	Battery, sodium-sulfur	300	50	6	Japan	Buzen	2016	
Jiangsu Jintan Salt Cavern Compressed Air Energy Storage Project	Compressed air storage	300	60	5	China	Changzhou	2022	Using a salt cavern situated 1,000 meters underground
Stanton Battery Energy Storage	Battery, lithium-ion	275.2	68.8	4	United States	Stanton, California	2023	
Minety Battery Energy Storage Project	Battery, lithium-ion	266	150		United Kingdom	Minety	2021	
DeCordova	Battery	260	260	1	United States	Granbury	2022	
Gateway Energy Storage	Battery, lithium-ion	250	250	1	United States	Otay Mesa, California	2020	
Rokkasho Aomari	Battery, sodium-sulfur	245	34	7	Japan	Rokkasho	2008	
Huanghe Hydropower Hainan Storage	Battery	202.8	202.8	1	China	Hainan, Qinghai	2020	Connected with adjacent 2.2 GW photovoltaic Huanghe Hydropower Hainan Solar Park
Crossett Power Management	Battery	200	200	1	United States	Crane County, Texas	2022	
Flower Valley II	Battery	200	100	2	United States	Reeves County, Texas	2022	
Gambit battery storage project	Battery, lithium-ion	200	100	2	United States	Angleton, Texas	2021	
Ruakākā Energy Park	Battery, lithium-ion	200	100	2	New Zealand	Ruakākā, Northland	2025	
Kunshan Energy Storage Power Station	Battery, lithium-ion	198	111	?	China	Kunshan	2020	
Pillswood	Battery, lithium-ion	196	98	2	United Kingdom	Cottingham	2022	Uses Tesla Powerpack. Adjacent to Creyke Beck substation for Dogger Bank Wind Farm.
Hornsdale Power Reserve	Battery, lithium-ion	193.5	150		Australia	South Australia, Jamestown	2017	Tesla Powerpack is charged using renewable energy and delivers electricity during peak hours to help maintain the reliable operation of South Australia's electrical infrastructure. It initially provided up to 100 MW peak with a capacity of 129 MWh, and was expanded in July 2020 to 150 MW/193.5MWh.
Korea Zinc Energy Storage System	Battery, lithium-ion	150	32.5		South Korea	Ulsan	2018	Ordered by Korea Zinc, a metal smelting company, at a cost of €37.87 million. It is located at its Ulsan refinery near the southeast coast.
Seosan PV ESS	Battery	140	52		South Korea	Seosan	December 2018	Adjacent to 65 MW Seosan PV Farm
Escondido Substation	Battery, lithium-ion	120	30	4	United States	Escondido	2017	
Khi Solar One	Thermal storage, steam	100	50	2	South Africa	Northern Cape Province, Upington	2016	Khi Solar One is a 50 MW concentrated solar power plant with a power tower that uses large, sun-tracking mirrors (heliostats) to focus sunlight on a receiver at the top of a tower. Water is pumped up to the tower mounted receiver and is converted to steam, which, in turn, is used in a conventional turbine generator to produce electricity. The power station will include a facility to store steam, enabling it to generate electricity for two hours when the sun is not shining.
Bat Cave battery storage project	Battery, lithium-ion	100	100	1	United States	Texas	2021	
North Fork battery storage project	Battery, lithium-ion	100	100	1	United States	Texas	2021	

=== Under construction ===
Energy storage power plants of at least 100 MW / 100 MWh
Name	Type	Capacity			Country	Location	Year	Description
Name	Type	MWh	MW	hrs	Country	Location	Year	Description
Meralco Terra Solar Project	Battery	4,500			Philippines	Bulacan and Nueva Ecija	2027	Paired with 3,500 MW solar plant
Silver City ESP	Compressed air storage	1,600			Australia	Broken Hill	2030	
Tongliao Wind Solar Storage Hybrid Project	Battery, lithium-ion	960	320	3	China	Tongliao	2022	Paired with 1,700 MW wind capacity and 300 MW solar capacity
Holtsville Energy Storage Project	Battery, li-ion	440	110	4	United States	Holtsville, New York	2025	Holtsville Energy Storage, LLC is a proposed 110 MW / four-hour battery energy storage facility in Brookhaven, New York, with enough storage energy capacity to power 18,366 homes, bringing numerous positive impacts to the local community and economy. The proposed facility, expected to be operational by 2025, will store energy that will be dispatched during peak demand hours and during emergency outages. Site Plans were unanimously approved by Brookhaven Town Planning Board on January 23, 2023.
Oakland	Battery	145	36.25	4	United States		2022	
Advanced Clean Energy Storage	Electrolysis of water	300,000	220		United States	Delta, Utah	2025	Initially, some hydrogen gas production will be supplemented with natural gas. There are plans to use 100% hydrogen in 2045. Rather than converting the hydrogen gas into electricity via an electrochemical cell, this system will use a hydrogen-capable gas turbine combined cycle power plant. Hydrogen gas will be stored in salt caverns rather than conventional storage tanks.

== Largest thermal energy storage plants ==
Thermal energy storage plants of at least 1 MW / 1 MWh
Name	Type	Capacity			Country	Location	Year	Description
Name	Type	MWh	MW	hrs	Country	Location	Year	Description
Mustikkamaa heat storage	Thermal storage, hot water in rock caverns	11,600	120	96	Finland	Helsinki	2022	Helen Oy is commissioning an 11.6 GWh capacity and 120 MW thermal output for its 260,000 m^{3} water cistern under Mustikkamaa (fully charged or discharged in 4 days at capacity), operating from 2022 to offset days of peak production/demand;
Vaskiluoto heat storage	Thermal storage, hot water in rock caverns	11,000	110	100	Finland	Vaasa	2020	Vaasan Voima Oy is operating a 11 GWh capacity and 110 MW thermal output for its 210,000 m^{3} water caverns under Vaasa (fully charged or discharged in 4–5 days at capacity), operating from 2020;
Reuter West	Thermal storage, hot water tank	2,600	200	13	Germany	Berlin	2022	Vattenfall's Reuter West combined heat and power (CHP) station near Berlin had a 56 megalitres (56,000 m^{3}) "thermos" tank added, for storing up to 200MW as hot water that can then be fed to Berlin's hot water consumers. It will be heated by otherwise unused electricity from renewable sources. The existing plant has a hot water capacity of 120MWth using by-product heat from the electrical generation.
Drake Landing Solar Community	Thermal storage, solar heat radiated to soil	1.5			Canada	Okotoks, Alberta		Drake Landing Solar Community began operation in 2006. Solar thermal energy is collected in flat plate glazed collectors, pumped to a bore field where the heat is radiated to soil. That process is reversed to utilize the heat in 52 single family (detached) homes. In 2012, DLSC set a world record by heating the 52 homes with 97% renewable energy. The borefield that stores the heat is approximately 100 feet wide in each direction and 120 feet deep.
Nissan Technical Center North America Inc.	Thermal storage, ice	22.8	1.425	16	United States	Michigan, Farmington Hills		The Ice Thermal Storage System provides load shifting to the building. On most days, the building can be cooled solely by the ice system, but a chiller is included, which covers peak cooling demand.
JC Penney Headquarters	Thermal storage, ice	53.1	4.425	12	United States	Texas, Plano		The system offsets the peak demands of electrical use by making ice each night to cool the building the following day.
Redding Electric Utilities - Peak Capacity, Demand Response, HVAC Replacement Program	Thermal storage, ice	6	1	6	United States	California, Redding		Ice storage system assists building cooling during daylight hours.
Glendale Water and Power - Peak Capacity Project	Thermal storage, ice	9	1.5	6	United States	California, Glendale		This project installed a total of 180 Ice Thermal Energy storage units at 28 Glendale city buildings and 58 local small, medium-sized, and large commercial businesses during a one-year installation process.
State Government of North Carolina	Thermal storage, chilled water	20.8	2.6	8	United States	North Carolina, Raleigh		2.68 million gallon, chilled water, Thermal energy storage tank. Built partially buried and serving the district cooling system for 25 state government buildings.
University of Arizona	Thermal storage, ice	18	3	6	United States	Arizona, Tucson		The university placed three separate orders for energy storage tanks and they were added to two of their three existing central plants in 2004, 2006 and 2007. There are 205 tanks in total at the two plants.
University of Central Florida	Thermal storage, chilled water	24	3	8	United States	Florida, Orlando		Chilled water thermal energy storage system that is integrated into the existing district cooling system for the university.
Redding Electric Utilities - Peak Capacity, Demand Response, HVAC Replacement Program Phase 2	Thermal storage, ice	12	6	2	United States	California, Redding		Ice Energy and REU will collaborate on the second phase. The program to install Ice Bear units within the northern California territory aims to reduce peak electricity load demand by up to 6 MW over five years. REU expects to have the thermal energy storage program completed in 2017. Skyway Machine, a local Redding manufacturing company, will provide final assembly of the new Ice Bear units.

== Largest by technology ==
Largest energy storage projects by technology
Technology	Name	Energy MWh	Power MW	Hours	Description	Country	Location	Refs
Battery, lithium-ion	Moss Landing Energy Storage Facility	1600	400	4		United States	Moss Landing, California	
Battery, lead acid								
Battery, sodium-sulphur	Sodium Sulfur Battery In Abu Dhabi	648	108	6	Virtual battery	United Arab Emirates	Abu Dhabi	
Battery, vanadium redox flow	Dalian VFB - UET / Rongke Power	800	200		The battery arrays approved by the China National Energy Administration will be made up of ten (10X) 20MW/80MWh Vanadium Flow Battery (VFB) energy storage systems connected to the main grid of Liaoning Province. After full commissioning, the VFB energy storage system will be able to peak-shave approximately 8% of Liaoning Province's expected peaking capacity in 2020. In addition, the large-scale battery will form an additional load center, which will enhance grid stabilization including securing the power supply and providing black-start capabilities in the event of emergency. This project will be deployed in two phases, each with 100MW/400MWh. The first phase will be finished around the end of 2017 and the second will be finished around the end of 2018. This project is approved by China National Energy Administration, and the owner is a JV with the major shareholder being a local utility company, and the minor being RONGKE POWER.	China	Dalian	
Compressed air storage	Huntorf CAES Plant	870	290		First commercial CAES plant, operational since 1978, using nuclear-sourced night-time power to compress and inject the air into two caverns of 310,000 m^{3} total volume. The 600 m cavern depth ensures the air's stability through seasonal temperature changes, and guarantees the specified maximum pressure of 100 bar. One cavern is cycled daily; the other serves as backup when the nearby nuclear power plant goes offline.	Germany	Huntorf	
Pumped hydro storage	Fengning Pumped Storage Power Station	40,000	3,600			China	Fengning Manchu Autonomous County, Hebei Province	
Flywheel	Beacon New York Flywheel Energy Storage Plant	5	20		The flywheel plant is used for frequency regulation in the NYISO service area. It consists of 200 individual spinning masses.	USA	New York	

== See also ==
- Battery storage power station
- Distributed generation
- Energy Reduction Assets
- Grid energy storage
- Hybrid power
- Outline of energy
- List of long-duration energy storage
- List of pumped-storage hydroelectric power stations
- Power transmission
