= Tehachapi Energy Storage Project =

Utility-scale battery energy storage system in California, U.S.

- Country: United States
- Location: Tehachapi, Kern County, California, United States
- Coordinates: 35°7′24″N 118°22′48″W
- Status: Decommissioned
- Construction began: 2013
- Commission date: 2014
- Decommission date: 2022
- Owner: Southern California Edison
- Operator: Southern California Edison
- Site area: 6300 sq. ft.
- Site elevation: 3966 ft.

Power generation
- Nameplate capacity: 8 MW
- Storage capacity: 32 MWh

External links
- Website: https://newsroom.edison.com/releases/sce-unveils-largest-battery-energy-storage-project-in-north-america
- Commons: Related media on Commons

The Tehachapi Energy Storage Project (TSP) was a 8MW/32MWh lithium-ion battery-based grid energy storage system at the Monolith Substation of Southern California Edison (SCE) in Tehachapi, California, California, United States. It has the capacity to power between 1,600 and 2,400 homes for four hours. At the time of commissioning in 2014, it was the largest lithium-ion battery system operating in North America and one of the largest in the world. TSP is considered to be a modern-day energy storage pioneer with significant accomplishments that have proven the viability of utility-scale energy storage using lithium-ion technology. While originally envisioned as a research and development project, TSP operated as a distribution-level resource for SCE and for calendar year 2020, SCE reported that TSP operated in the wholesale energy market with revenue exceeding operating and maintenance costs. In 2021, SCE began the decommissioning of TSP, which was followed by formal decommissioning by state regulators in 2022. The physical dismantlement of TSP is expected to be completed by the end of 2022.

== System ==
At a windy mountain pass on the edge of the Mojave Desert, North America’s most potent collection of batteries used for storing unused power is humming its way toward an electricity revolution.

— Whitney McFerron, Bloomberg

In May 2013, Southern California Edison awarded the TSP contract to a consortium led by LG Chem, the battery division of the South Korean industrial conglomerate LG Corporation. LG Chem supplied the battery systems while ABB supplied the inverters and LG CNS provided the engineering and construction support.

The TSP system was one of the first to demonstrate the assembly of a large quantity of lithium-ion batteries into a single system on the order of megawatts of power and tens of megawatt-hours of energy to provide electric grid support. The project uses electric vehicle-grade batteries and demonstrates the synergies between batteries for the automotive and electric grid sectors. During 2009 to 2014, more than 120 grid energy storage projects were commissioned, marking a significant turning point for grid batteries. The TSP system had a significant role in this as a large, utility-owned system providing multiple energy services using commercially available products.

The TSP system was designed and evaluated using an application-driven approach. Energy storage for the wind farms at Tehachapi Pass have been extensively studied before, including the impacts of energy storage at Monolith Substation. As Edison International, parent company of Southern California Edison (SCE), describes, there is a continued interest in energy storage from utilities, along with a view that there will be technical innovations to help with managing the grid in a more efficient and reliable manner.

The history of seismic activity in Kern County, including damage to substation structures, created some challenging system design requirements, such as having the populated battery racks designed and tested to meet IEEE 693-2005, Recommended Practice for Seismic Design of Substations recommendations. Since commissioning in 2014, the area has experienced not only seismic activity, but also flash floods and subsequent mudslides.

One key lesson learned is the importance of subscale testing by the electric utility prior to full system deployment so that the safety and operational controls and features could be fully evaluated. This was the first known use of a subscale system by an entity other than a manufacturer or integrator to facilitate full-scale testing, commissioning, and ongoing operations. The mini-system test plan included two phases:

1. Performing safety testing on the expected behavior of the batteries and battery management system during interruptions to communication paths during system startup and operation and
2. Performing system acceptance tests on the Mini-System to verify correct operation of the control algorithms, test modes, and system response prior to performing the same tests on the full system.

The original mini-system provided engineers with support for full system startup and commissioning, but, with only one battery section and one inverter lineup, engineers were unable to test the multi-inverter lineup-battery section operation of the system in the laboratory, such as inter-section balancing controls, multi-inverter operation, and symmetrical and unsymmetrical operation of the inverter lineups. To more closely resemble the full system, the mini-system was expanded in December 2015 to include twice the number of each component, resulting in a system with two inverter controllers, inverter lineups, and battery sections.

Mini-system used for sub-scale testing and evaluation

The TSP system is constructed of 608,832 lithium-ion battery cells that are enclosed into 10,872 modules of 56 cells each and then stacked in 604 racks. A bi-directional inverter or power conversion system (PCS) provides the DC-to-AC conversion during battery discharging and AC-to-DC conversion for battery charging. The batteries are housed in a 6,300-square-foot (590 m^{2}) building. The TSP system can supply 32 megawatt-hours of energy, at a maximum rate of 8 megawatts. This is sufficient to power between 1,600 and 2,400 homes for four hours. The amount of energy stored at TSP is equivalent to that stored in more than 2,000 Chevrolet Volt hybrid electric vehicles.

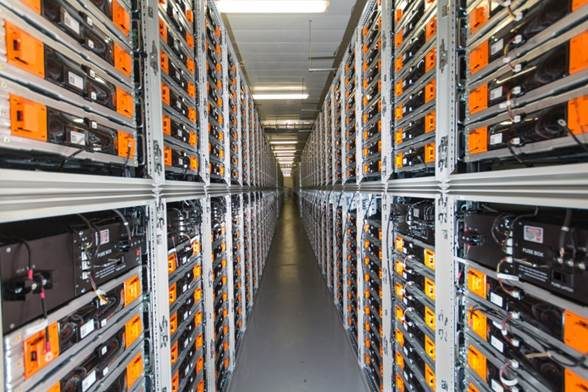
Inside the Tehachapi Energy Storage Project during construction

Specifications for mini-system and full system
	Mini-System at Pomona, CA (Original)	Mini-System at Pomona, CA (December 2015 Expansion)	Full System at Tehachapi, CA
Footprint	77 square feet	154 square feet	6300-square-foot building
Power	30 kW	60 kW	8 MW
Energy	116 kWh	232 kWh	32 MWh
Inverter	One mini-cabinet	Two mini-cabinets	Two 40-foot containers
Sections	1	2	4
Banks	1	2	32
Racks	2	4	604
Modules	36	72	10,872
Cells	2,016	4,032	608,832

== Deployment ==
TSP is an example of commercially available large-scale energy storage for electric grid applications and part of the increasing fleet of energy storage systems. The deployment of TSP has been part of the key foundation in developing energy storage in California and for increasing grid reliability overall. TSP is also providing improved integration and opportunities for better operation of renewable energy resources.

In 2014, TSP was one of the large-scale energy storage projects in the interconnection queue for the California Independent System Operator (CAISO) with planned benefits including firming renewable generation, frequency regulation, spin and non-spin replacement reserves, ramp management, and energy price arbitrage. The TSP system was tested using eight core tests performed by the grid operator or under market control. Some of the lessons learned included the challenges related to outage scheduling, challenges with interconnection agreements, benefits of component validation testing at the factories, and preparing detailed step-by-step test plans in advance. Both the utility and system provider gained important perspectives and insights during the design, construction, commissioning, and operating of the TSP system.

To evaluate the 13 operational uses, SCE defined eight tests to measure the ability of TSP to respond to the following system needs or signals:

1. Provide steady state voltage regulation at the local Monolith 66 kV bus
2. Provide steady state voltage regulation at the local Monolith 66 kV bus while performing any other tests
3. Charge during periods of high wind and discharge during low wind under SCE system operator control
4. Charge during off-peak periods and discharge during on-peak periods under SCE system operator control
5. Charge and discharge seconds-to-minutes as needed to smooth intermittent generation in response to a real-time signal
6. Respond to CAISO control signals to provide frequency response
7. Respond to CAISO control signals to provide spin and non-spin reserves
8. Follow a CAISO market signal for energy price.

Tehachapi Operational Uses and Tests
Operational Use			Test							
Operational Use			1	2	3	4	5	6	7	8
Transmission	Voltage Support	1	X	X						
Transmission	Decreased Losses	2			X					
Transmission	Diminished Congestion	3			X					
Transmission	Increased System Reliability	4				X				
Transmission	Deferred Transmission Investment	5			X		X			
Transmission	Optimized Renewable-Related Transmission	6			X		X			
System	System Capacity/Resource Adequacy	7				X		X		
System	Renewable Integration (firming & shaping)	8					X			
System	Output Shifting	9				X				
ISO Market	Frequency Regulation	10						X		
ISO Market	Spin and Non-Spin Reserves	11							X	
ISO Market	Deliver Ramp Rate	12						X	X	
ISO Market	Energy Price Arbitrage	13								X

The final project report for the United States Department of Energy after system deployment concludes that TSP is a modern-day energy storage pioneer, achieving a number of significant accomplishments that have proven the viability of utility-scale energy storage using lithium-ion technology. These accomplishments include:

- The largest lithium-ion battery energy storage system in North America in terms of energy capacity (32 MWh) at the time of commissioning in 2014
- The first battery energy storage system in California specifically designed and operated as a dual-use asset, supporting utility transmission and distribution functions and operating in the competitive power market
- The first known use of a subscale or mini-system by an entity other than a manufacturer or integrator to facilitate full scale testing, commissioning, and ongoing operations
- The first battery energy storage system integrated with SCE’s systemwide Supervisory Control and Data Acquisition (SCADA) system providing high-level visibility and control to grid operators
- The first battery energy storage system to be operated by SCE and one of the first to be interconnected, certified, and operated in the CAISO market
- The first modern, large-scale, lithium-ion battery energy storage system installed in an SCE substation and connected to the regional transmission network
- Serving as the foundation for subsequent SCE energy storage procurements

== Operation ==
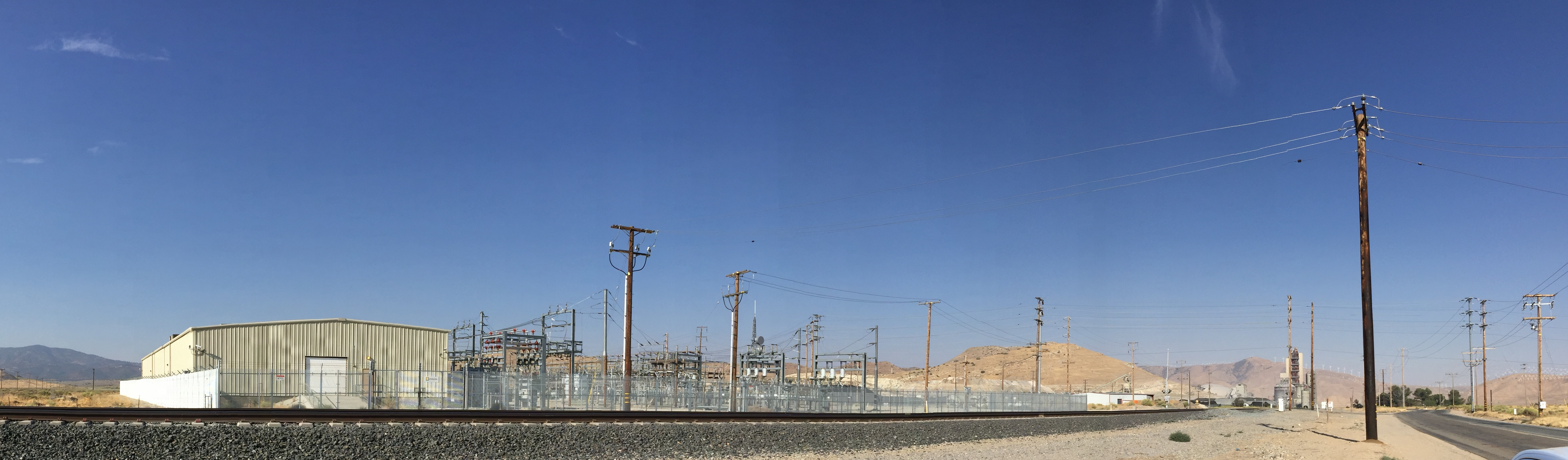
Panoramic view of the battery building for the Tehachapi Energy Storage Project and Monolith Substation

Since the start of market operations in 2016, TSP has been listed in the Monthly Electric Generator Inventory of the Energy Information Administration (EIA) as an electric generator. During that time period, the EIA began publishing more-detailed energy storage information in its Annual Electric Generator Report, including battery capacity, charge and discharge rates, storage technology types, reactive power ratings, storage enclosure types, and expected usage applications.

The operation of the TSP system has been described as a real-life example of grid-connected energy storage, and some of the initial testing included storing wind energy at night and delivering it during the day when customers need it. The California Independent System Operator (CAISO), a grid system operator, shares its operating experiences of TSP internationally with other grid operators as part of continued close collaborations. The ongoing operation of the TSP system continues to provide grid services in the energy market and lessons learned for grid energy-storage systems.

In its annual report to the California Public Utilities Commission (CPUC) for calendar year 2020, SCE reported that TSP continued to operate in the CAISO wholesale market and that market benefits exceeded operating and maintenance costs. In addition to market operations, SCE continued to collect operating data to evaluate the long-term operating characteristics of grid scale lithium-ion battery storage technology.

TSP was taken offline on May 17, 2021 and on August 23, 2021, SCE submitted a request to the CPUC for the decommissioning of TSP due to the cost of safety upgrades and cybersecurity concerns. On May 5, 2022, the CPUC formally decommissioned TSP, nine years after it came online. The physical dismantlement of TSP is expected to be completed by the end of 2022. All of the battery cells will be recycled and the inverter will be repurposed. TSP operated for more than four years beyond the original two-year demonstration period, which SCE considers to be significant due to the fact that TSP uses first-generation lithium-ion BESS products that are no longer in production. The additional operational period has provided lessons learned about long-term operations, maintenance, and repairs. Due to the system size, TSP will be one of the first and largest lithium-ion battery systems to undergo decommissioning. SCE describes that:

TSP was a highly successful project that helped transform the industry, demonstrate large lithium-ion BESS technology, increase operational experience for SCE, and provide value for California utility customers. The BESS far exceeded its original two-year demonstration; it's appropriate to decommission now.

== Analysis ==
One of the major benefits of the TSP system is the wide range of studies and analyses performed by multiple organizations to address various aspects of the energy market. Operational information has been used as part of developing incentives for distributed energy storage for California, New York, Hawaii, and several other states. The energy management system (EMS) and EMS structure for TSP have been studied to develop and determine the technical, market, and regulatory requirements for energy-storage systems.

The University of California, Riverside has used TSP for the stochastic valuation of energy storage in wholesale power markets to determine optimal power dispatch sequences. The findings from this study include:

1. System performance is heavily affected by roundtrip efficiency and power-to-energy ratio.
2. The optimal power-to-energy ratio for wholesale power market is much higher than the nominal configuration of 1-to-4 typically used in existing energy storage projects.
3. The majority of revenues are from frequency regulation services.

In a separate analysis, the University of California, Riverside used real market data from TSP to develop an optimal supply and demand bidding, scheduling, and deployment design framework based on the day-ahead and real-time market prices, location, size, efficiency, lifetime, and charge and discharge rates. The topic of used and second-use batteries is also examined and analysis shows that by using one of the proposed bidding methods, TSP could still be profitable even after losing half of its energy capacity.

Based on the studies described above, the University of California, Riverside performed an additional analysis for the scenarios where battery systems are investor-owned and independently operated and participating in existing markets. The study proposes a new optimization framework to coordinate the operation of large, price-maker, and geographically dispersed energy storage systems in a nodal transmission-constrained energy market.

The Institute of Electrical and Electronics Engineers (IEEE) published a collection of technical papers analyzing energy storage, including a review of TSP. The review described how TSP met the project objectives and provided the required operational uses. While there were some challenges, including control system issues and a poor transformer design, these issues were not related to the storage technology itself. SCE continues to use its experiences from TSP in the development of additional energy storage projects.

The Edison Electric Institute (EEI), which represents all investor-owned utilities in the United States, published a set of case studies and described how TSP has capabilities to provide nearly instantaneous maximum capacity for renewables ramping, which minimizes needs for traditional backup generators. EEI also described that TSP remained operational after the 24-month pilot and testing period of the project.

The European Commission performs an ongoing analysis of energy storage systems, including TSP, and has global collaborations with technical experts to exchange and to learn about operating details, challenges, and best practices. Some of the challenges resolved for TSP included the programming logic, safety limits, and data aggregation, as well as the use of consistent paths for component communications. The analysis also mentions how in general, the system integration and control aspects for energy storage systems need to be resolved and addressed by a European master plan. In addition, recycling is a topic that needs to handled as market growth continues.

PV Tech Power published a journal article describing how TSP and battery storage are being used as peaking capacity. The article mentions that TSP provided support for the rapid expansion of renewable energy, as well as being a rare utility-scale battery with a 4-hour duration during the 2014 timeframe when it was commissioned. The article explains how four hours is now considered to be the optimum duration for peaking capacity for two reasons: 1) Mitigating peak demand as solar power ramps down in the late afternoon and evening and 2) Providing the optimum cost point for lithium-ion batteries to provide that capacity.

== Awards and accolades ==
It seems an unlikely setting for a technology revolution: a wind-swept patch of Mojave Desert, squeezed in beside railroad tracks and a giant cement plant. But there it is, on the grounds of Southern California Edison’s Monolith substation near Tehachapi, Calif.: the largest battery for storing electricity in North America.

— Bill Loving, Edison International - Energized

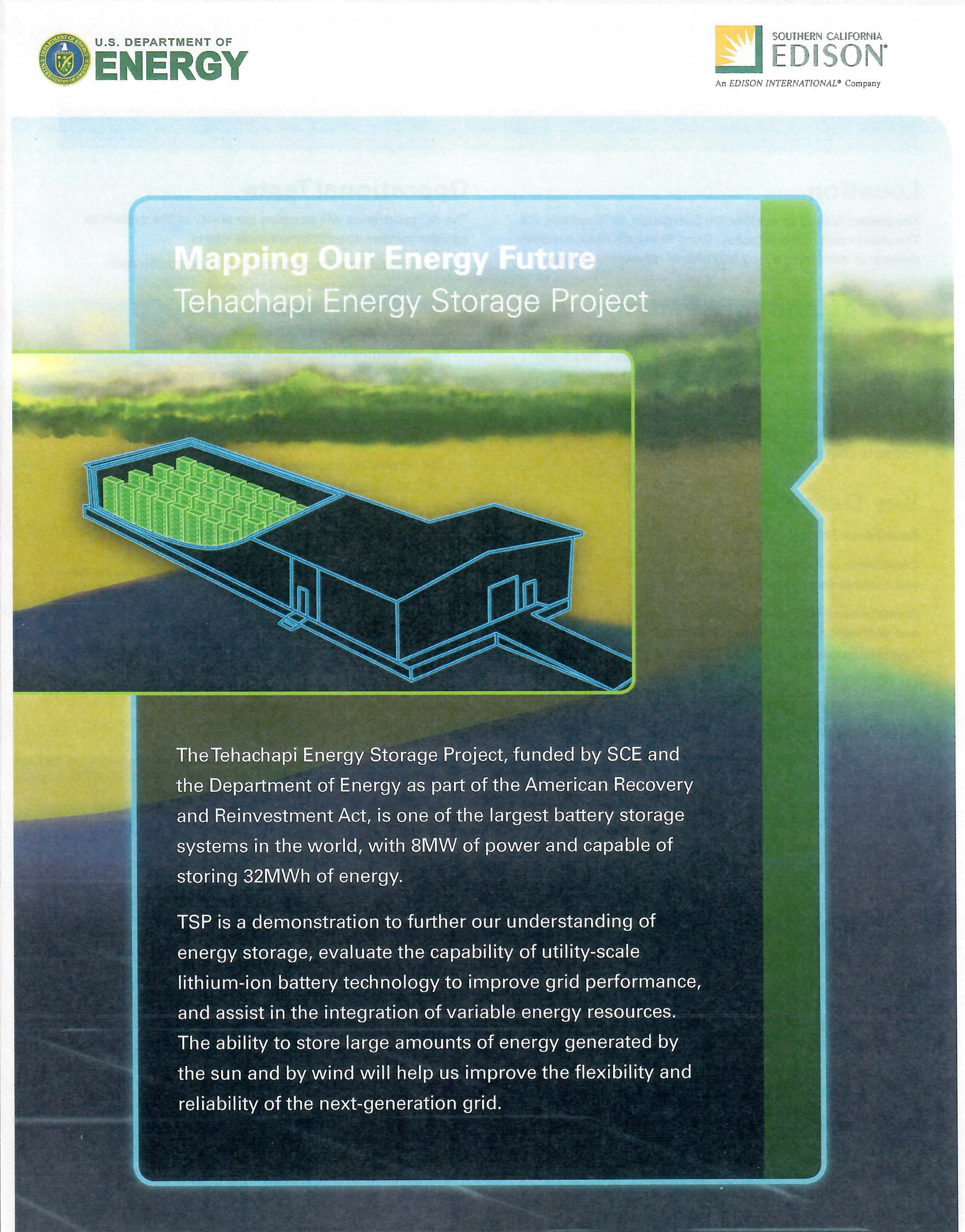
Information sheet distributed during ribbon-cutting ceremony-Page 1

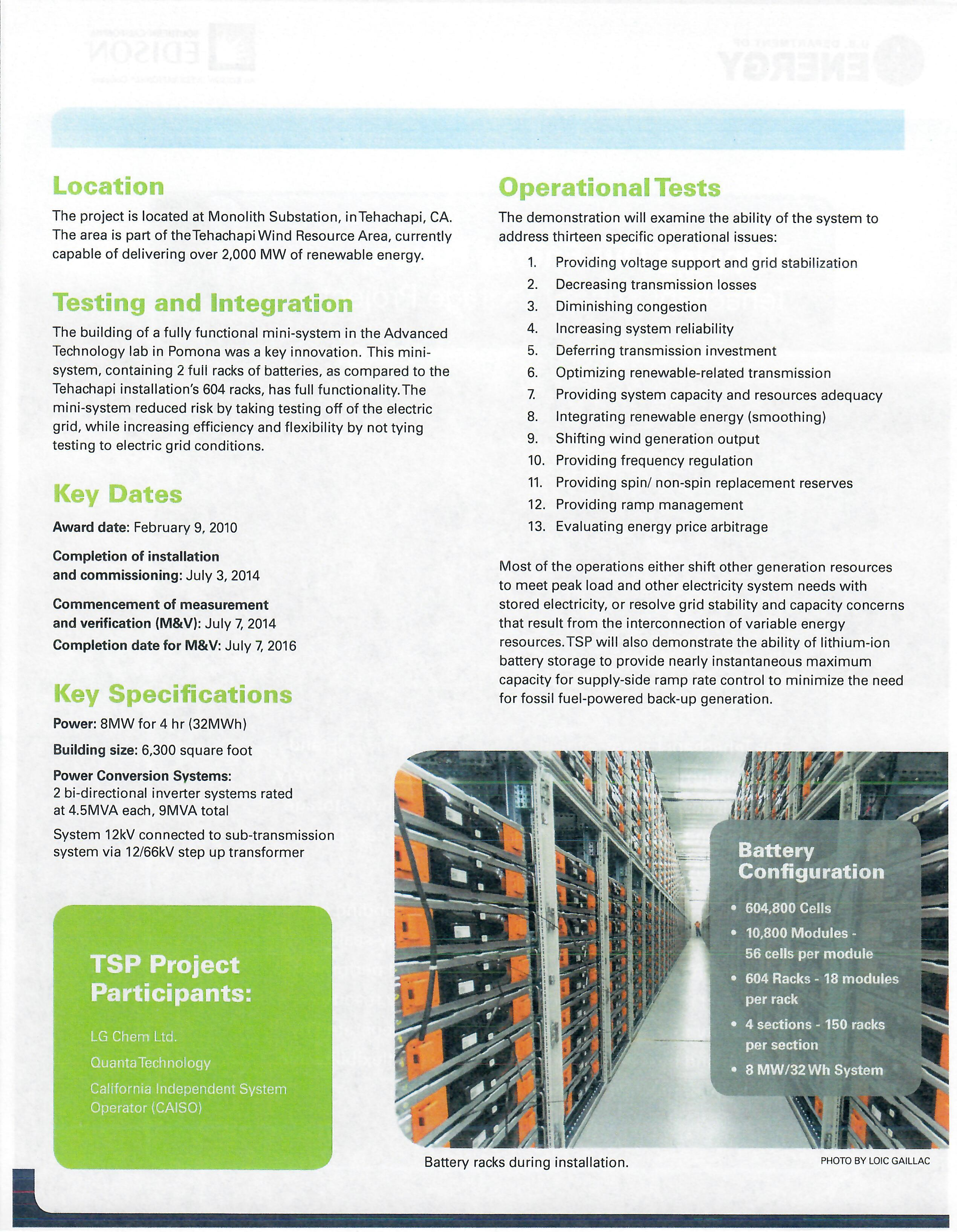
Information sheet distributed during ribbon-cutting ceremony-Page 2

An official ribbon-cutting ceremony, site tour, and presentation of a certificate of recognition from the California State Senate were held on September 24, 2014. The ceremony speakers included Doug Kim (Director of Advanced Technology, Southern California Edison), Zack Scrivner (Supervisor, Kern County Board of Supervisors), Dr. Imre Gyuk (Energy Storage Program Manager, United States Department of Energy), Dr. Seokhwan Kwak (Vice President of Marketing, LG Chem), and Romeo Agbalog (Office of State Senator, Jean Fuller – 18th District). Tours of the control room, battery room, and inverter enclosures were provided.

Upon commissioning, TSP was selected as a finalist for the 2014 Innovation Award for Energy Storage North America (ESNA) and elected to the ESNA Hall of Fame. Later in 2014, TSP was included in Innovations Across the Grid published by the Edison Foundation Institute for Electric Innovation, which described how the distribution grid is evolving to optimize the electric grid, integrate new resources, and provide customer solutions. TSP was featured as a real-life, new energy resource case study.

PBS science correspondent Miles O'Brien covered TSP in the December 15, 2015 edition of PBS NewsHour in a segment with Doug Kim of SCE that discussed the use of TSP to store energy generated by wind turbines.

A hundred miles north of Los Angeles, in Tehachapi, California, the wind can be a bountiful resource, but, unfortunately, not at the right time. It blows hardest at night, spooling up these wind turbines to their peak output, when the demand for electricity is at it lowest.

— Miles O'Brien, PBS NewsHour

So, matching the output of wind to when customers really need it, that's certainly one of the things that we're looking at with this system that you see here, because you can store energy.

— Doug Kim, PBS NewsHour

In 2016, the California Energy Storage Alliance featured TSP in the lead position in a video with policymakers, utility executives, and energy storage pioneers titled Gamechangers: How Energy Storage Transforms the Power System, which describes how SCE pioneered the use of grid energy storage. Region 6 of the IEEE awarded its Director's Award to SCE in 2016 with the successful completion of TSP as one of the key accomplishments. The Energy Storage Association (ESA) awarded LG Chem the Brad Roberts Award for Outstanding Industry Achievement in 2017 for marketplace and industry accomplishments during the past several years, including the successful delivery and commissioning of TSP.

At the Kern County Energy Summit 2017, Vibhu Kaushik, SCE principal manager, described TSP as the start of utility-scale energy storage projects for SCE.

…the story really started here in Kern County about five years ago when we built the world’s largest energy storage project, the Tehachapi Battery Storage Project. 8 megawatts 32 megawatt-hours. It got a lot of attention and made news everywhere as battery storage became a part of the energy mix at that time as people started looking at battery storage as a megawatt-size utility-scale resource.

— Vibhu Kaushik, Kern County Energy Summit 2017, Southern California Edison’s Recent Energy Storage Projects

PBS featured TSP in the Search for the Super Battery episode of Nova in 2017. Host and science writer David Pogue described how lithium-ion batteries are being installed on the grid and Doug Kim of SCE explained the use of TSP for smoothing, firming, and time shifting of wind power.

The 2018 and 2019 Economic Round Table Reports from the Greater Antelope Valley Economic Alliance include TSP as a highlight in the Renewable Energy sections. Kern County, California describes TSP as a key feature in its renewable energy portfolio for storing energy from solar power and wind power and improving grid flexibility and reliability. Kern County continues to cultivate energy storage as providing economic development opportunities for 2020 and beyond; by 2023, storage facilities a hundred times bigger than TSP are operating in Kern, California and USA.

In 2019, the U.S. Department of Energy featured TSP in Success Stories Spotlight: Solving Industry’s Energy Storage Challenges. The case study examined two areas: technology advancement and impact. TSP advanced technology by showing the abilities of lithium-ion battery storage systems to ramp up nearly instantaneously to maximum power capacity. TSP also demonstrated technical capabilities for frequency regulation, decreased transmission losses, voltage stabilization, and deferred transmission investment. The case study describes how TSP was operated outside of a laboratory and at scale. As a result, one of the important impacts of TSP is that it provided practical experience in operations and reliability under real-word conditions as one of the largest energy storage systems located on a high-traffic grid. The project provided hardware and software learning opportunities for the system supplier for future projects. Additional impacts included providing increased definition and development of the process for interconnecting energy storage systems to the grid. In turn, this provided improvements for integrating energy storage systems into power markets and providing financial data for the valuation of future projects. One additional impact mentioned was that the TSP provided an increased amount of renewable energy on the grid, as well as improved grid reliability and power quality.

In 2021, Forbes mentioned TSP as a notable example of energy storage used by SCE for charging and discharging power from the electric grid in support of renewable energy and electric utility preparations for electrification and decarbonization. Forbes explained that TSP can store and discharge energy at any time using lithium-ion batteries with a limited duration.

== See also ==
- List of energy storage projects
- List of battery storage power stations in California
