= Cerro Dominador Solar Thermal Plant =

Chilean electrical plant

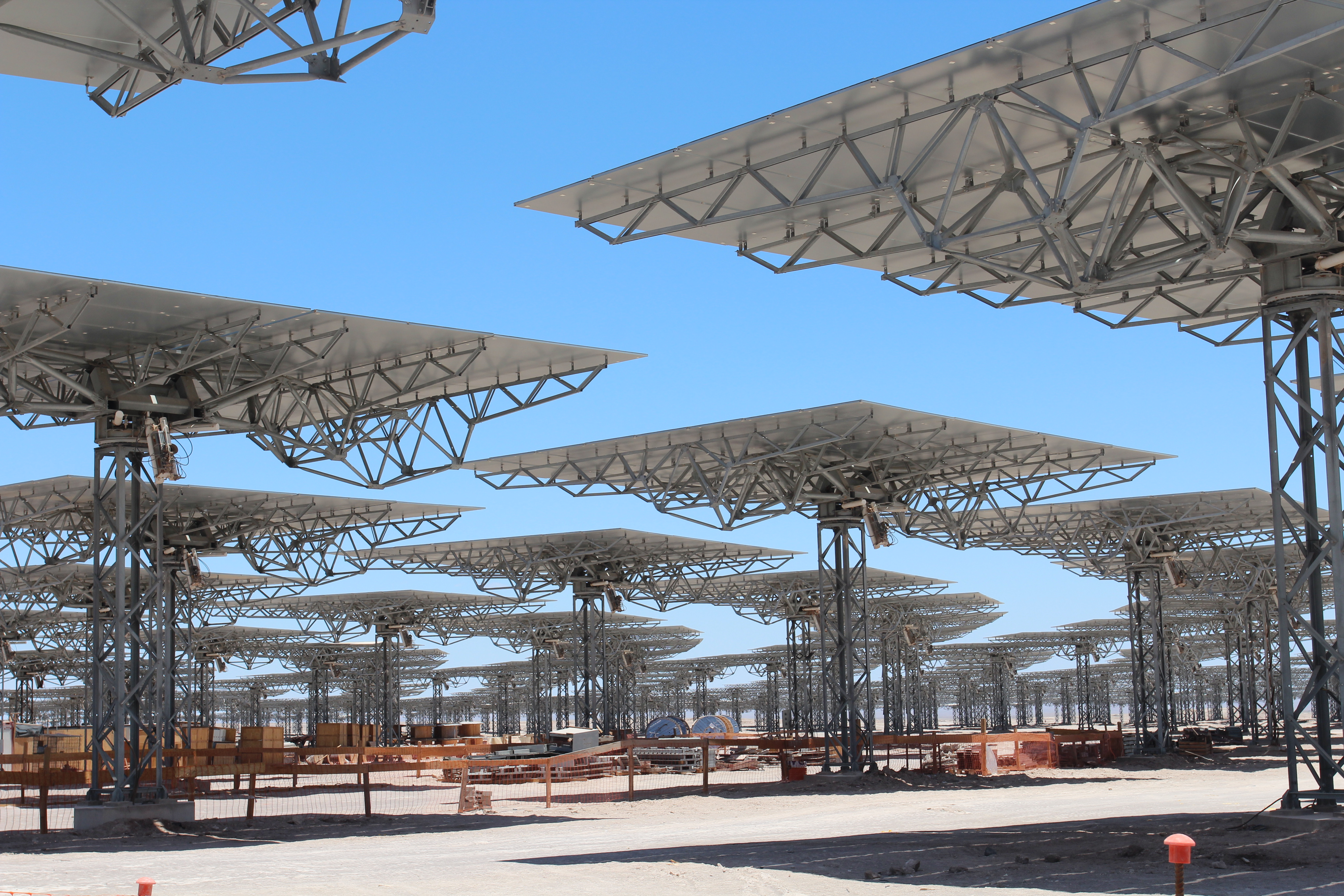
- Official name: Planta Solar Cerro Dominador
- Country: Chile
- Location: Antofagasta
- Coordinates: 22.77191°S 69.47994°W
- Status: Operational
- Construction began: May 2014
- Commission date: June 8th 2021
- Construction cost: est. $1 billion
- Owner: EIG Global Energy Partners

Solar farm
- Type: CPVCSP
- CSP technology: Solar power tower
- Collectors: 10,600
- Site area: 750 ha (1,900 acres)

Power generation
- Units operational: 100 MW
- Units under const.: 110 MW
- Nameplate capacity: 210 MW
- Annual net output: 950 GW·h (secured sale)
- Storage capacity: 1,925 MW·h_{e}

External links
- Commons: Related media on Commons

Cerro Dominador Solar Power Plant (Spanish: Planta Solar Cerro Dominador) is a 210-megawatt (MW) combined concentrated solar power and photovoltaic plant located in the commune of María Elena in the Antofagasta Region of Chile, about 24 kilometres (15 miles) west-northwest of Sierra Gorda. The project was approved by the Chilean government in 2013 and construction was started by Abengoa Solar Chile, a branch of the multinational Abengoa Spain. The plant was inaugurated on June 8, 2021. A follow-up project called Likana Solar bid $33.99/MWh in an auction in August 2021.

== History ==
Construction started in May 2014. On 29 August 2015, workers mobilization started a strike over poor working conditions. Following Abengoa financial woes, construction halted in January 2016, after about 1,500 workers were fired from the project, leaving only maintenance personnel on site. Construction progress was more than 50% complete. In October 2016, EIG Global Energy Partners became the sole owner of the project, after acquiring the participation of Abengoa, which remained as a technological partner and builder.

In February 2018, after Abengoa completed the construction of the 100 MW photovoltaic section, the plant started operation.

In May 2018, EIG Global Energy Partners closed a $758 million financing and Abengoa partnered with Acciona to restart construction and execute the second phase of the CSP section, which happened in June 2018. Among the financing funders are Natixis, Deutsche Bank, Société Générale, ABN AMRO, Banco Santander, Commerzbank and BTG Pactual.

In February 2020, the melting process of 45,000 tons salt in the thermal storage unit was initiated. The salt mixture was produced by the SQM mining company (Sociedad Química y Minera, a Chilean chemical supplier of fertilizers, iodine, lithium and industrial chemicals).

Its solar receiver weighing 2,300 tons was raised at the end of February 2020 to a height of 220 meters in the central tower of the complex, giving the tower a total height of 252 meters.

== Cerro Dominador CSP project ==
The Cerro Dominador project will see the construction and operation of a 110 MW concentrated solar power plant with storage in the northern Chilean region of Antofagasta, located in the Atacama Desert, one of the driest places with the highest solar radiation on earth. When finished, Cerro Dominador will be the largest CSP power plant with storage in Latin America. The facility will have a total aperture area of 1,484,000 m^{2} (15,970,000 sq ft), fully usable at noon. It was grid connected in April 2021.

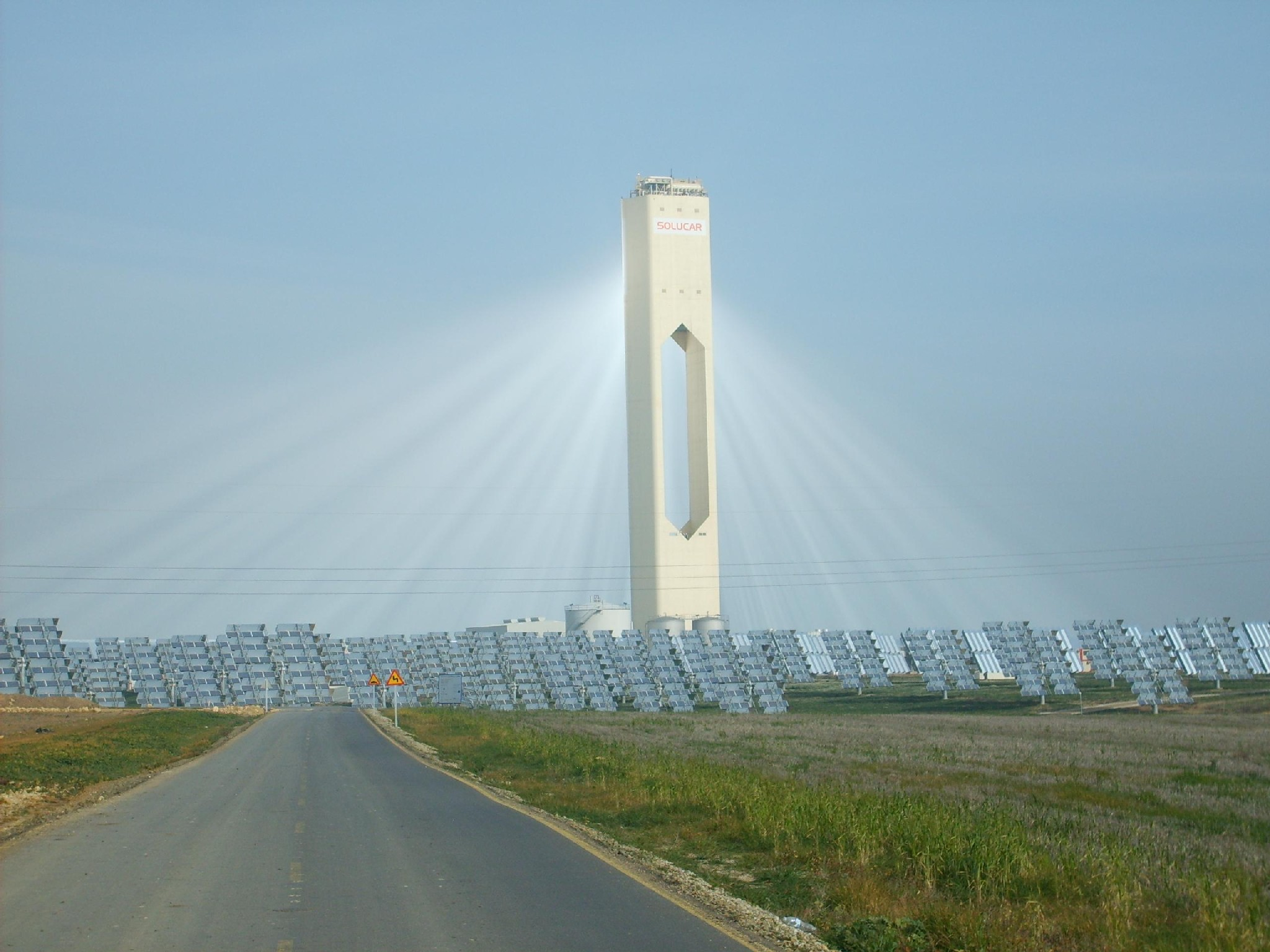
PS10 is the first commercial CSP (Concentrated Solar Power) plant of the World, built in Andalusia , Spain . CSP is also called “concentrating solar power” or “concentrated solar thermal”.

== Details ==
=== Technology ===
The Cerro Dominador project has a 110 MW solar-thermal tower. This technology uses a series of mirrors (heliostats) that track the sun on two axes, concentrating the solar radiation on a receiver on the upper part of the tower, where the heat is transferred to molten salts. The molten salts then transfer their heat in a heat exchanger to water, generating superheated steam, which feeds a turbine that transforms the kinetic energy of the steam into electric energy using the Rankine cycle. In this way, the Cerro Dominador plant is capable of generating around 110 MW of power. The plant has an advanced storage system enabling it to generate electricity for up to 17.5 hours without direct solar radiation, which allows it to provide a stable electricity supply without interruptions if required. The Project secured up to 950 GW·h per year sale. Additionally, the plant has a sub-station and transmission line connected to the SING (Sistema Interconectado del Norte Grande) or Norte Grande Electric Grid.

With 252 metres in height, the main tower is the second tallest man-made structure in Chile after Gran Torre Costanera.

The plant has an estimated lifespan of 30 to 50 years.

=== Funding ===
The cost of the project is estimated at US$1 billion, and construction started in May 2014. The Chilean government, through CORFO, is providing US$20 million of funding and is also loaning the land where the plant is located. The government also negotiated loans from the Inter-American Development Bank, or "IDB", the Clean Technology Fund (dispensed through the IDB), the German state-owned development bank (KfW), and the European Union.

A Power purchase agreement was signed with Empresas Copec in December 2019, running 5 years from July 2020.

=== Purpose ===
The project is part of Chile's national renewable energy program, intended to provide Chile with cleaner energy, while also reducing its dependency on fossil fuels like coal and natural gas. Chile has set a target to produce 20% of its electricity from clean energy sources by 2025.

Cerro Dominador will prevent the emission of approximately 643,000 tons of CO_{2} into the atmosphere every year. The construction, operation and maintenance of the plant will also act as a catalyst for regional socio-economic development, creating a large number of direct and indirect jobs in construction, development, commissioning and plant operation as well as a network of services that will promote economic growth in the region.

== See also ==
- Antofagasta
- Atacama Desert
- Concentrated solar power
- List of solar thermal power stations
- María Elena
- María Elena Solar Power Plant
- Renewable energy
- Solar thermal energy
