= Southern California Edison =

Electrical utility in Southern California, United States

- Type: Subsidiary
- Industry: Electric utilities
- Headquarters: 2244 Walnut Grove Ave., Rosemead, CA 91770
- Area served: Central, Coastal & Southern California
- Key people: Steven D. Powell (CEO)
- Products: Electricity generation Electric power transmission Electric power distribution
- Revenue: ▼US$16.275 billion (2023); US$17.172 billion (2022)
- Operating income: ▲US$ 2.640 billion (2023); US$1.513 billion (2022)
- Net income: ▲US$1.597 billion (2023); US$954 million (2022)
- Number of employees: ▲14,316 (2023); 12,831 (2022)
- Parent: Edison International
- Website: sce.com

Southern California Edison (SCE) is the primary electric utility company for much of Southern California, United States. It provides 15 million people with electricity across a service territory of approximately 50,000 square miles. (Note: Substantial portions of the southern California territory are served by the Los Angeles Department of Water and Power, San Diego Gas & Electric (SDG&E), Imperial Irrigation District, and some smaller municipal utilities. SCE is the largest subsidiary of Edison International. The northern part of the state is generally served by the Pacific Gas & Electric Company of San Francisco. Other investor-owned utilities (IOUs) in California include SDG&E, PacifiCorp, Bear Valley Electric, and Liberty Utilities.)

SCE owns all of its electrical transmission facilities and equipment. Deregulation of California's electricity market in the late 1990s forced the company to sell many of its power plants. SCE retained its hydroelectric plants, totaling about 1,200 MW, and a 75% share of the 2,150-MW San Onofre Nuclear Generating Station which was decommissioned in 2013.

In addition to its electric business, SCE operates the sole gas utility and water utility on Santa Catalina Island, under the names Catalina Island Gas Company and Catalina Island Water Company.

Many wildfires have been attributed to SCE's equipment, and SCE is named as the subject of numerous lawsuits alleging negligence as a cause, including for the Eaton Fire.

== History ==
The origins of the company lie with the scheme of business magnate Henry E. Huntington and hydraulic engineer John S. Eastwood, developed around 1908, for a vast complex of reservoirs to be constructed in the Sierra Nevada Mountains of central California. Huntington founded Pacific Light and Power, one of the roughly two dozen companies he controlled at the time, to execute what would eventually become one of the largest hydropower systems in the United States, the Big Creek Hydroelectric Project. Pacific Light and Power was one of the predecessor companies to SCE, along with Edison Electric, Mt. Whitney Power & Electric Co., California Electric Power Co., Southern California Power Co., and others.

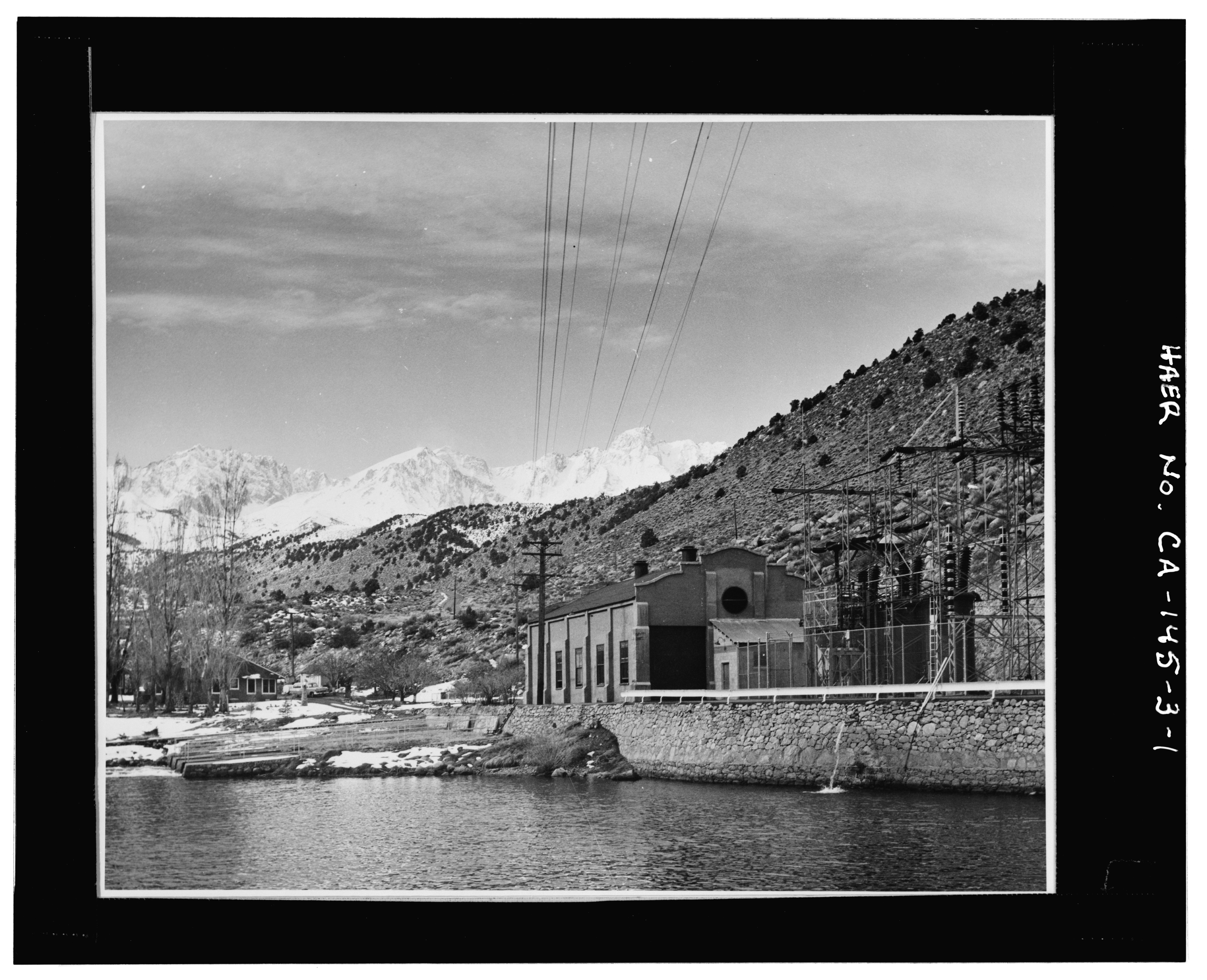
Southern California Edison Plant 3, Bishop, California, c. 1959

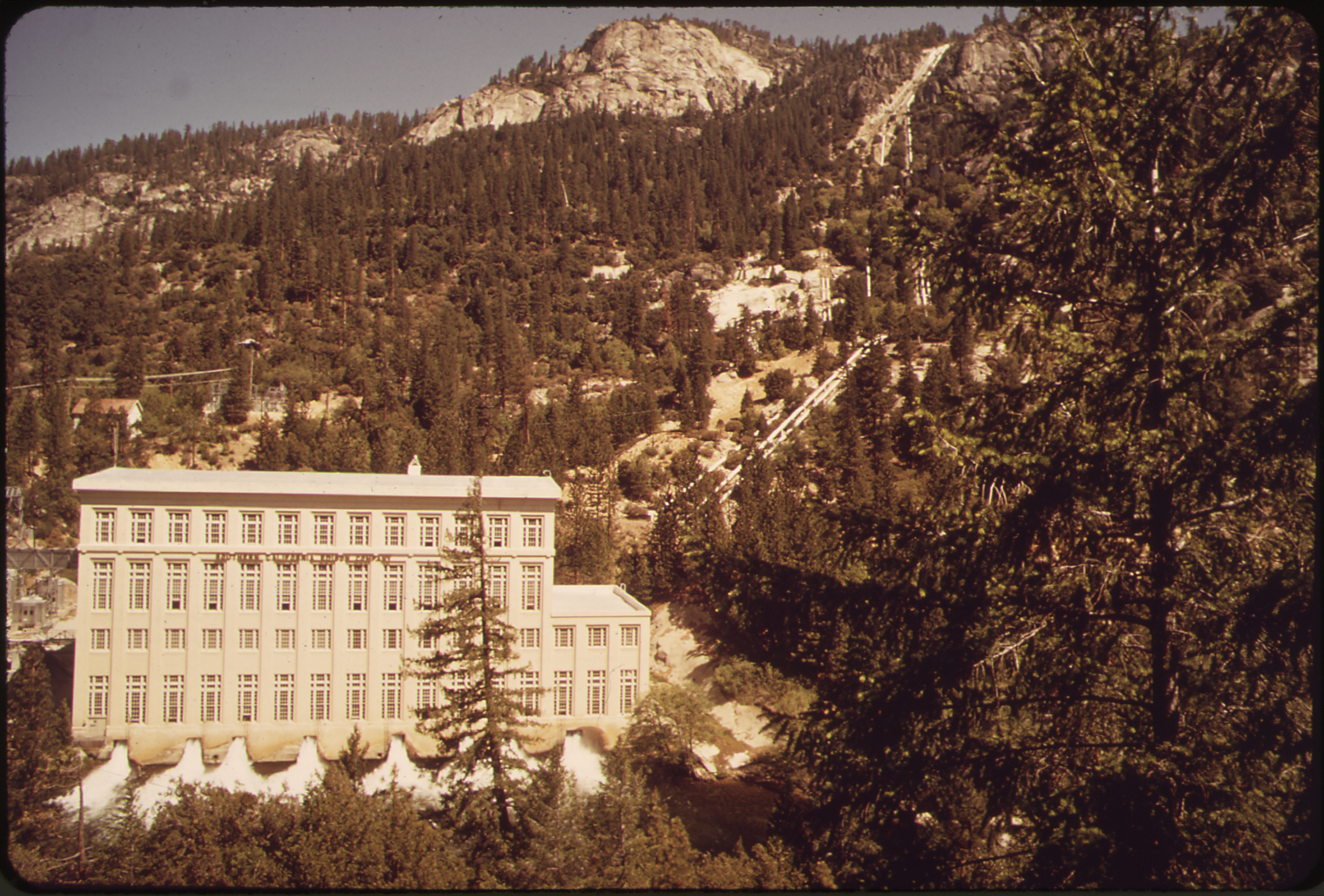
SoCal Edison plant, Big Creek, California, May 1972

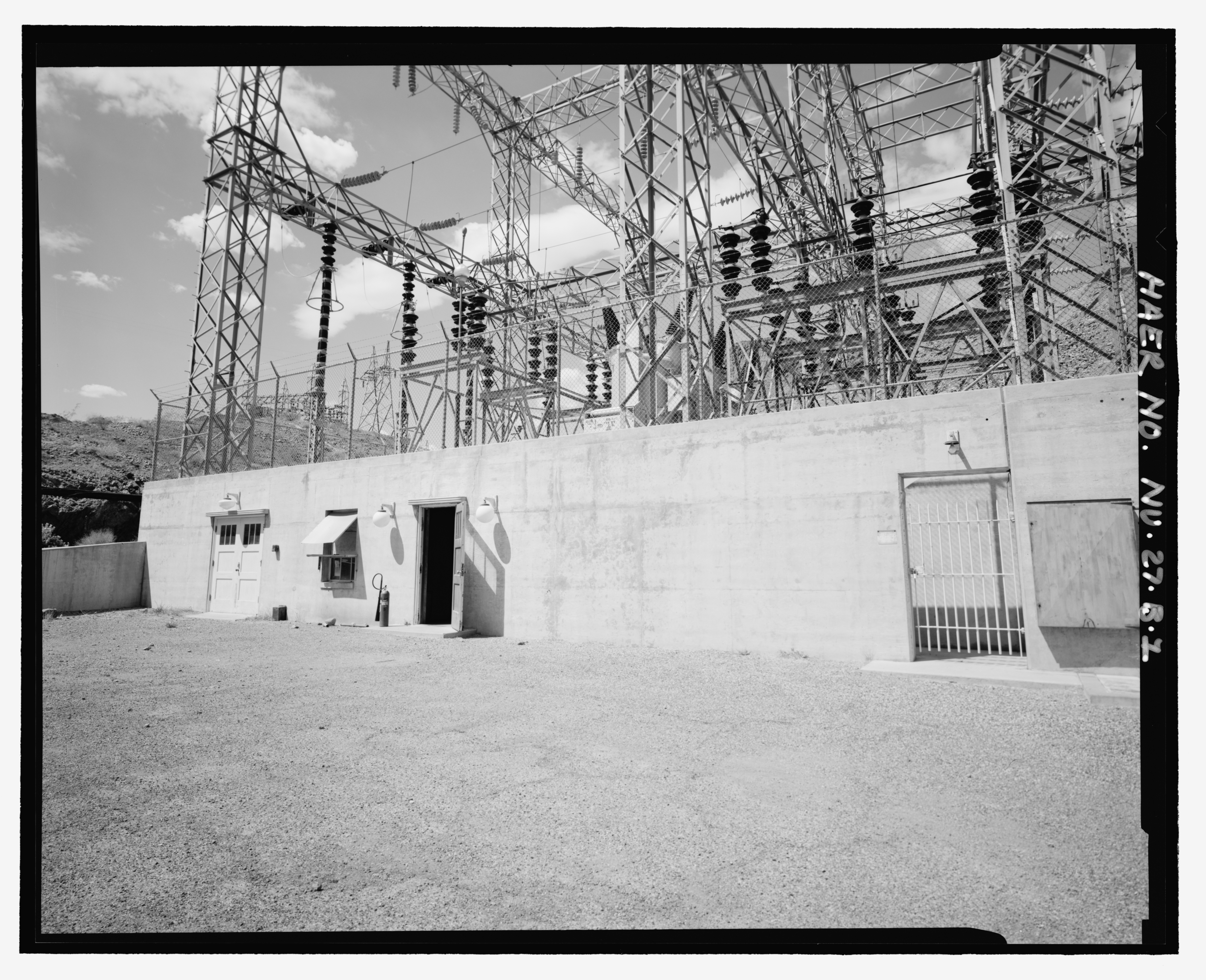
SoCal Edison 138-kilovolt substation, Boulder City, Nevada, 2001

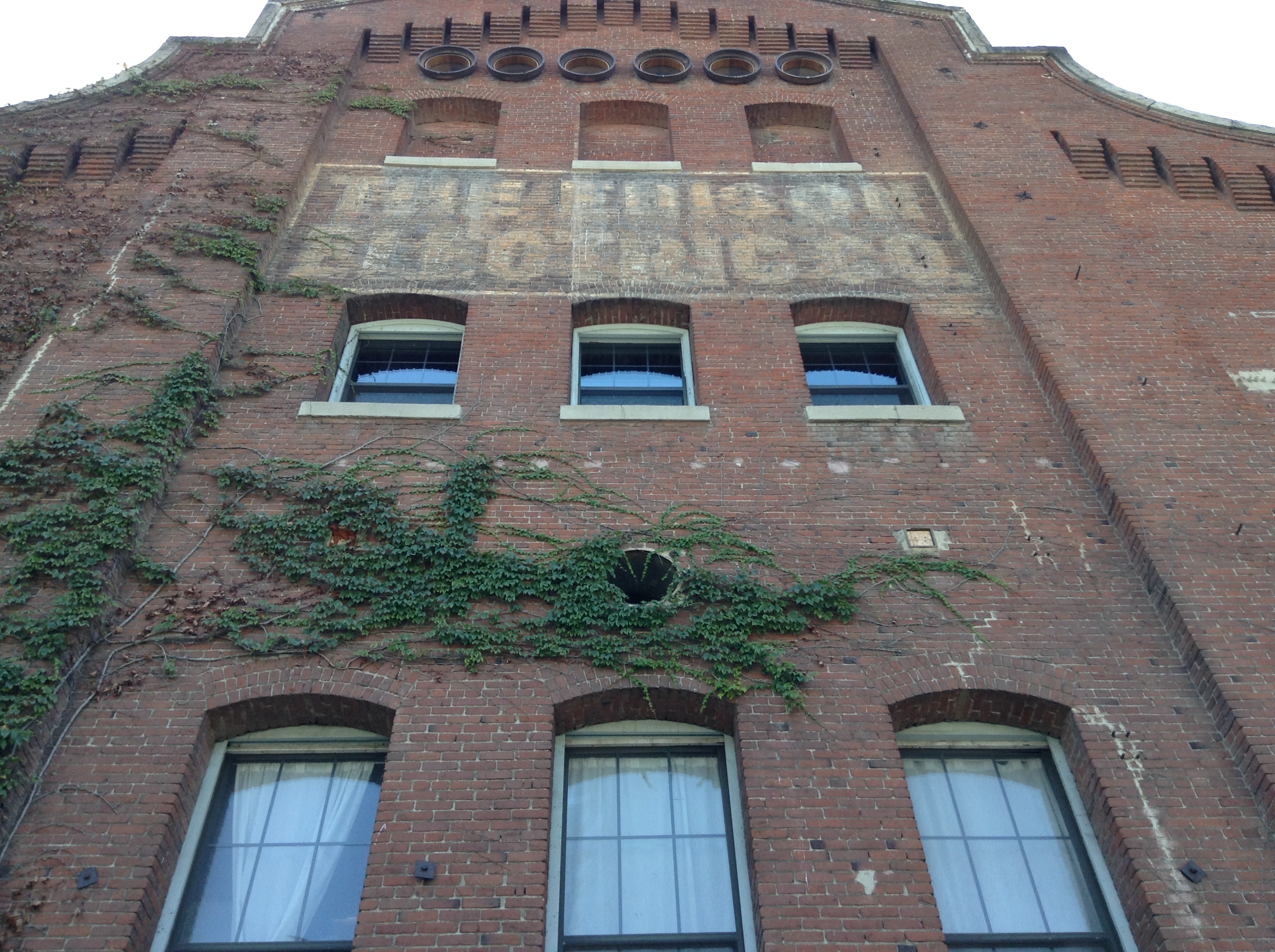
Edison Steam Plant in Lincoln Heights, Los Angeles, now part of the Brewery Art Colony

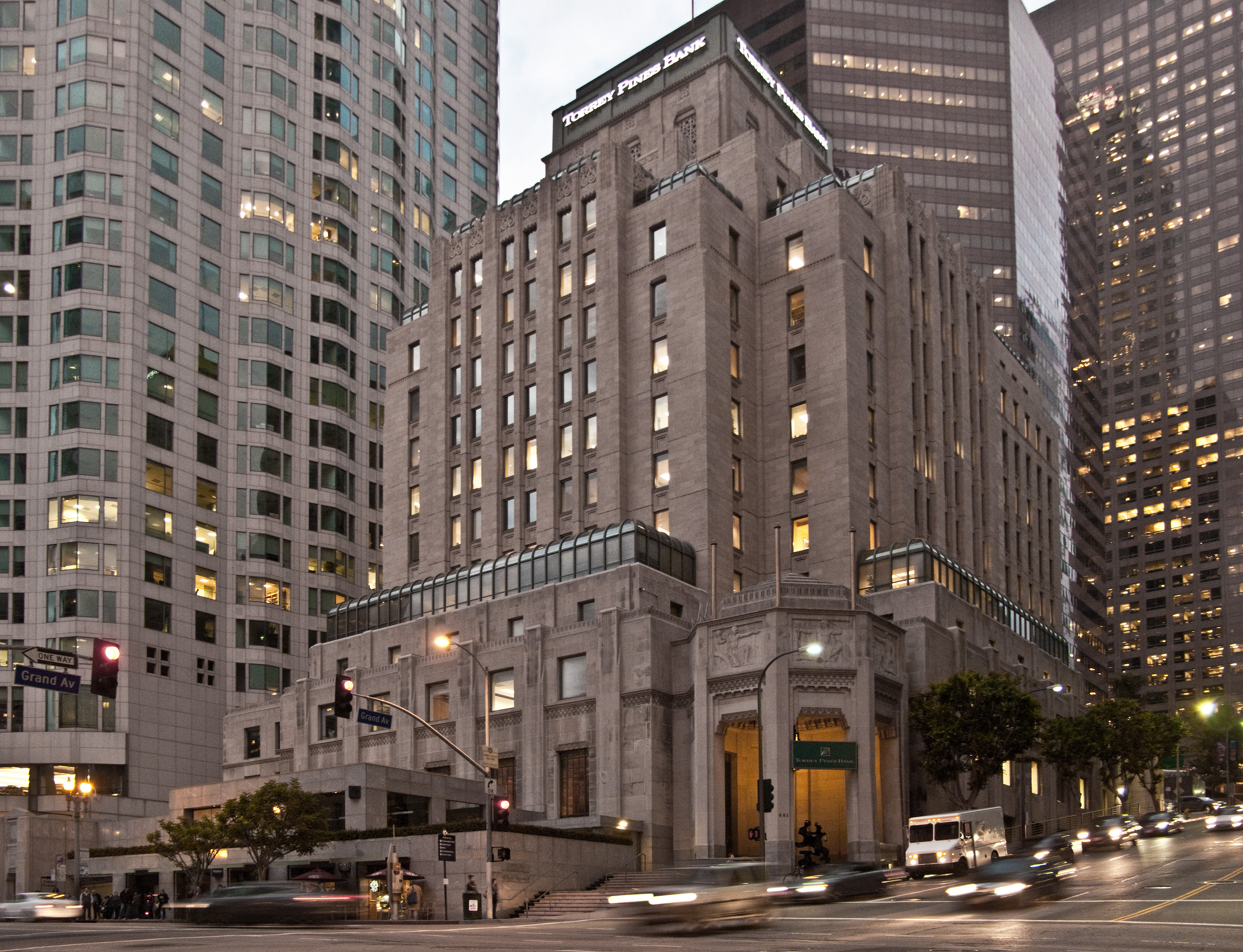
Edison Building, 601 West Fifth Street, Los Angeles, designed by Allison & Allison

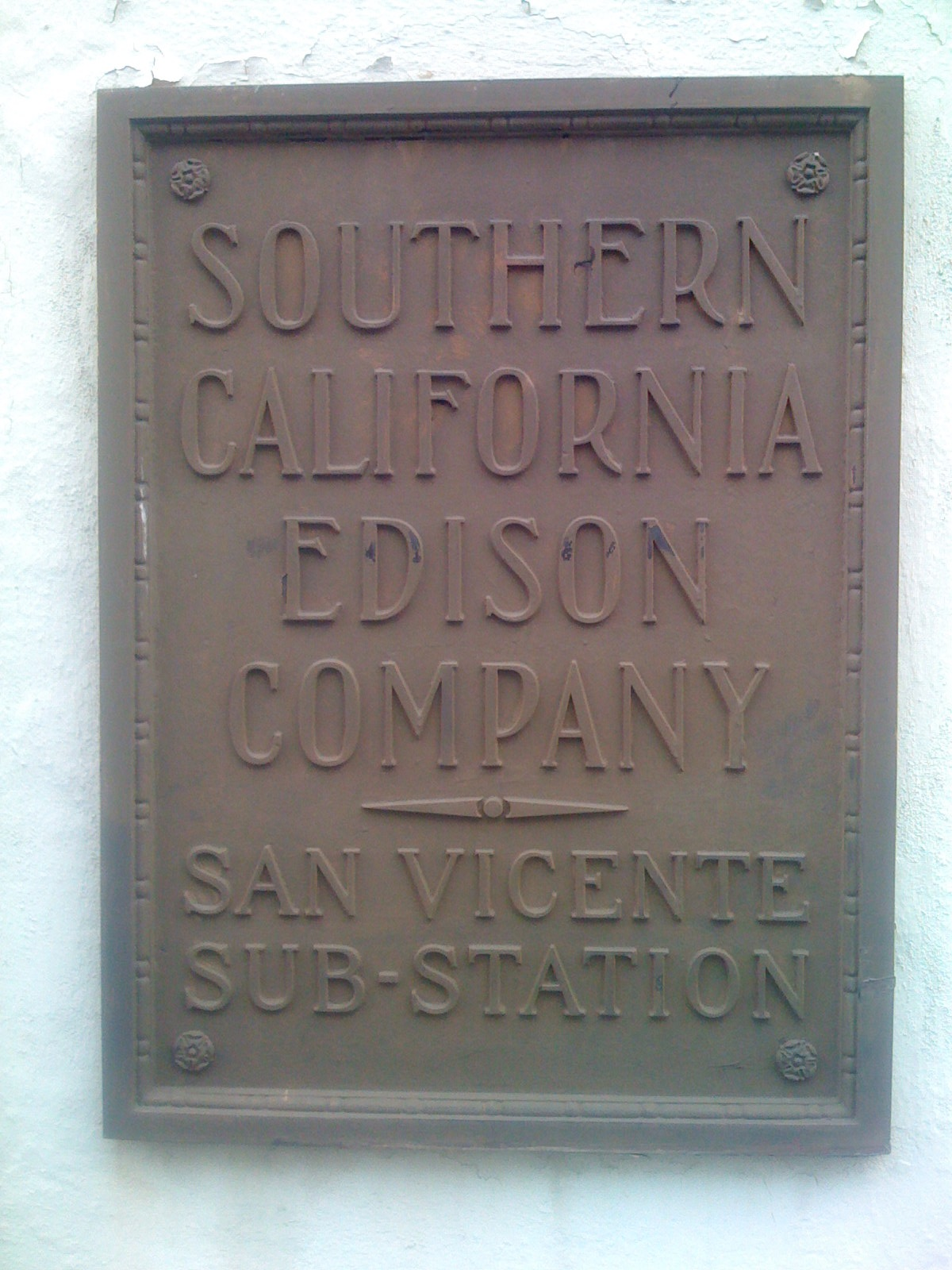
Sign for Southern California Edison Company San Vicente Sub station

In 2011, a shooting occurred when an employee of Southern California Edison opened fire at an office building in Irwindale.

== Energy Sources ==
=== Renewable energy ===
Southern California Edison allows its customer to obtain their electricity entirely from renewable sources by subscribing to a "green rate".

Reservoirs owned by SoCal Edison include:

- Mammoth Pool Reservoir
- Balsam Forebay
- Shaver Lake
- Florence Lake Dam
- Huntington Lake
- Lake Sabrina
- Lake Thomas A Edison
- Redinger Lake

In 2006, Southern California Edison planned to secure 1,500 megawatts or more of power generated from new projects to be built in the Tehachapi Pass Wind Farm area. The contract, which more than doubles SCE's wind energy portfolio, envisions more than 50 square miles (130 km^{2}) of wind parks in the Tehachapi region, which is triple the size of any existing U.S. wind farm.

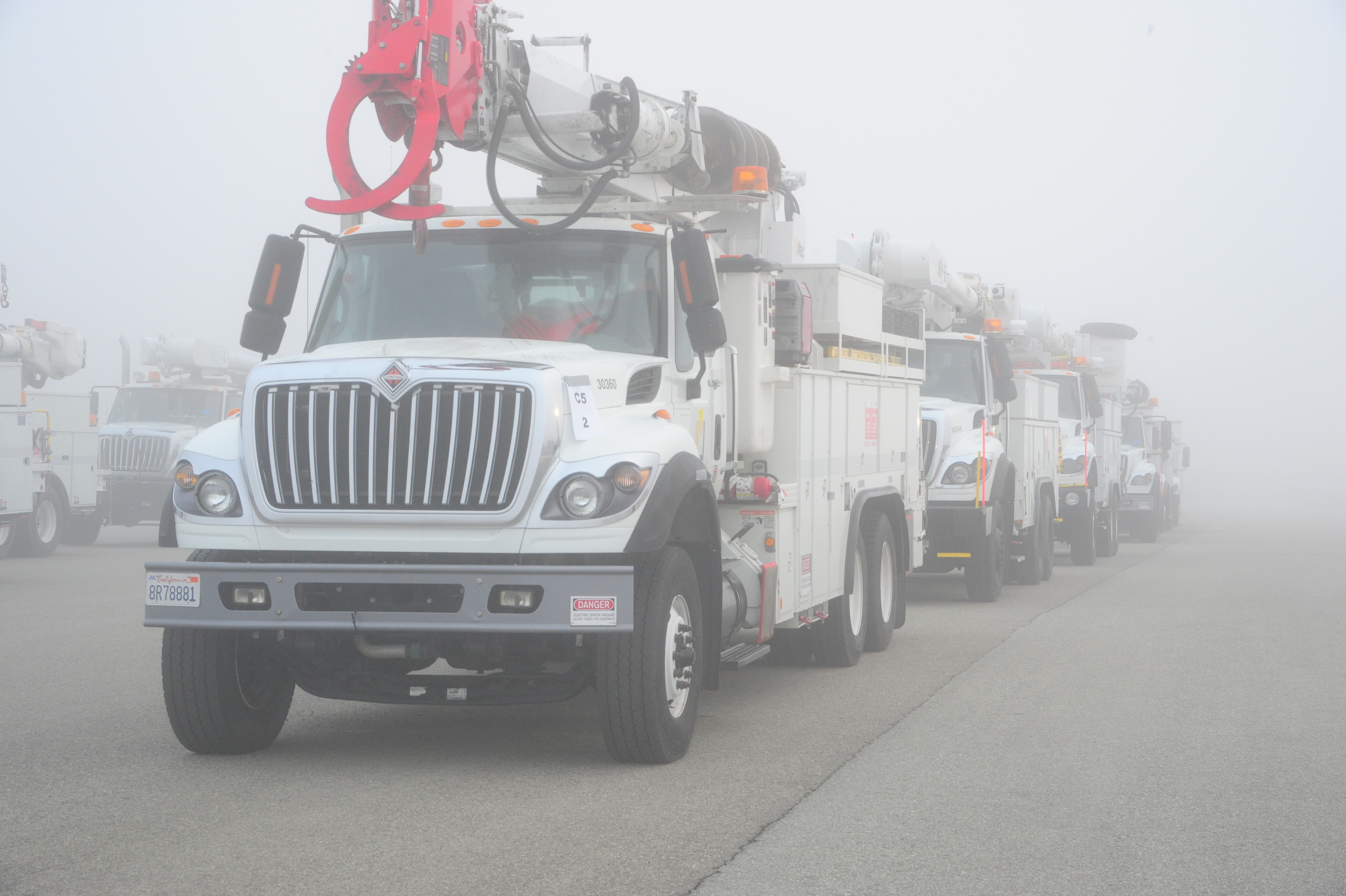
Southern California Edison trucks lined up for delivery to help restore power in the wake of Hurricane Sandy, 2012.

In March 2008, Southern California Edison announced a $875 million project to build a network of 250 megawatts of photovoltaic solar power generation, making it the biggest solar cell project in the nation. The photovoltaic cells will cover 65,000,000 square feet (6,000,000 m^{2}) of rooftops in southern California and will generate enough power to serve 162,000 homes.

In 2009, Southern California Edison entered into a contract with Solar Millennium to purchase solar thermal power up to 726 MW. Southern California Edison also entered into a contract with Stirling Energy Systems to buy electricity from a 500 megawatt, 4,600 acre (19 km^{2}), solar power plant which was due to open in 2009. The purchase was canceled in late 2010, as changes in technology reduced the cost of photovoltaic-based solar power to below that of solar Stirling generated power. This would have been the first commercial application of the dish stirling system. A different technology from the more familiar solar panel, the dish concentrates solar energy by the use of reflective surfaces and by the use of the Stirling heat engine to convert the heat into electricity.

In 2014, Southern California Edison installed the Tehachapi Energy Storage Project, which is composed of more than 600,000 lithium-ion battery cells at Monolith Substation in Tehachapi, California in order to test storing power generated from an area that currently has 5,000 wind turbines.

In 2014 SCE had a renewables mix of 23%. By 2016, 28.2% of SCE's power sources were renewable.

=== Natural gas and energy storage ===
In 2017, the company opened two new hybrid electric gas turbine (EGT) units called peaker plants, that combine gas turbines and storage batteries at the same site. Each plant delivers around 50-megawatts; the batteries can provide 10-megawatts and four megawatt-hours of power. Both the turbines and the batteries are designed and manufactured by General Electric's Power Division.

The plant runs the battery first in a series of short bursts, saving gas usage for longer power demand. The combination of a 30-minute duration battery improves the environmental impact of the gas turbine. The SCE setup (the first of its kind) cut greenhouse gas emissions by 60%, reduced annual water usage by 2 million gallons and lowered the number of gas starts by 50%.

=== Interconnections ===
Southern California Edison's power grid is linked to other California ISO resources by the Path 26 transmission lines that generally follow Interstate 5 over Tejon Pass. The interconnection takes place at a large substation at Buttonwillow. CAISO's and WAPA's Path 15 and Path 66, respectively, from Buttonwillow north eventually connect to BPA's grid in the Pacific Northwest. There are several other interconnections with local and out-of-state utilities, such as Path 46.

== Policies and Practices ==
=== Electric vehicles ===
Southern California Edison has a number of resources and a rate designed specifically for electric vehicle users.

As of July 2018, Southern California Edison planned to add thousands of new charging stations for passenger electric vehicles (EV). This addition is a component of the company's "Charge Ready" program, a pilot program with the aim of increasing the availability of charging ports for EVs.

Since 2016, Southern California Edison has installed 1,000 charging stations throughout their Southern and Central California service area.

The company also runs a rebate program for electric vehicle purchases.

=== Energy research and policy ===
Southern California Edison has a long history of research in the energy arena. Often this includes working with other companies and government entities. One example is the SOLARII feasibility generator, which was a solar-powered energy plant that could produce electricity 24 hours a day. This was done by heating molten salts that would hold the heat during the day and would be used to generate power at night.

Dr. John Jurewitz served as Director of Regulatory Policy for Southern California Edison for 15 years until his retirement in July 2007. His major areas of research are in oil, gas, and electricity policy and greenhouse gas regulation. He has testified and participated in government-sponsored proceedings addressing electric industry restructuring and energy policy at the state, federal, and international levels.

In November, 2014, SCE announced a partnership with Ice Energy to provide more efficient energy storage by freezing water at night when electricity is cheaper.

=== Labor practice controversy ===
In 2015, Southern California Edison laid off about 400 IT employees, with an additional 100 IT workers leaving voluntarily. Meanwhile, the utility company hired immigrants from India through Infosys, based in Bangalore, and Tata Consultancy Services in Mumbai, which are among the largest users of H-1B visas. SCE was subsequently investigated by the US Department of Labor for potential H1-B visa abuse.

== Disasters and Litigation ==
Major wildfires have been caused by Southern California Edison's equipment.

=== 1996 Calabasas Fire ===
The Calabasas Fire was a wildfire that burned in October 1996, destroying six structures, burning 13,010 acres, and threatening the campus of Pepperdine University. During the subsequent investigation, Edison refused to provide certain documents to Cal Fire investigators. Suspecting that these documents might reveal more information, Cal Fire had one of their investigators pose as an architecture student to gain entry to Edison's office and develop floor plans for a raid. Investigators ultimately found that Edison's equipment had started the fire. The Los Angeles County District Attorney's office investigated the possibility of criminal conduct and concluded that while Edison had not been diligent in monitoring the trees near its power lines and that it had destroyed evidence during the investigation into the cause of the fire, its conduct did not rise to the level of criminality. Following the raid, Edison and the government also entered an agreement on future procedures for investigations on wildfire causes.

=== Creek Fire (2017) ===
The Creek Fire was a wildfire that burned in Los Angeles from December 5, 2017 to January 9, 2018. It destroyed 123 structures.

Initially, scrutiny fell on the Los Angeles Department of Water and Power (LADWP) for causing the fire, and they were sued by over 300 fire victims and the federal government. However, it was discovered during the litigation process that at the time of the initial investigation, SCE had provided incomplete data. Specifically, SCE had provided data for its equipment on December 4 but not December 5 (the day the fire started), and the new data for December 5 revealed that an electrical fault had taken place at the time that the Creek Fire started. In light of this new data, a federal investigator concluded that the Creek Fire had been caused by SCE's equipment. The federal government is currently suing SCE for both causing the fire and withholding evidence. The government also alleges that SCE violated the agreement they made following the 1996 Calabasas fire and intentionally pinned the blame on the LADWP. SCE denies all of these allegations, including that they started the fire, claiming that the only reason they provided data for the wrong day was because of a mistake made by one of their employees early in the process.

=== Thomas Fire ===
The Thomas Fire (Note: There were initially two fires that started on the same day: the Thomas Fire, and the Koenigstein Fire. The two fires merged that night and are collectively known as the Thomas Fire.) was a wildfire that burned in Ventura County and Santa Barbara from December 2017 to January 2018. It destroyed over 1,000 structures and killed two people, as well as destabilized the soil, which led to mudflows in Montecito that killed 23 people and destroyed over 100 homes. An official investigation concluded that Edison's equipment was responsible for starting both the Koenigstein Fire and the Thomas Fire. Edison paid over $2.7 billion in settlements related to the fire and mudslides.

On January 30, 2025, the California Public Utilities Commission (CPUC) unanimously approved SCE's request to raise their rates to cover over $1.6 billion in payments made to Thomas Fire victims. This was opposed by numerous residents of Los Angeles, who argued that customers who had already been affected by wildfires should not have to bear responsibility for Edison's mistakes, and that the decision would fail to hold Edison accountable and lead to further inaction on their part. Seven state legislators (Note: Ben Allen, John Harabedian, Jacqui Irwin, Monique Limón, Sasha Renée Pérez, Pilar Schiavo, and Henry Stern.) also wrote a letter to the head of the CPUC expressing opposition to the rate hike. In return, Edison asserted that they would spread the costs over 30 years to minimize the financial impact on customers.

=== Woolsey Fire ===
The Woolsey Fire was a wildfire that burned in Los Angeles County and Ventura County in November 2018, destroying 1,643 structures and killing three people. In 2020, the CPUC released a report concluding that the fire was caused by Edison's electrical equipment. Edison later paid $2.2 billion in settlements related to the fire.

The California Department of Justice investigated the possibility of filing criminal charges against SCE but ultimately decided not to, finding that while SCE's equipment and poor vegetation control had led to the fire, their conduct did not rise to the level of criminality. The decision not to prosecute was criticized by attorneys representing fire victims. Politico later reported that just days before this announcement, California Attorney General Rob Bonta had received a $72,500 donation from SCE. A spokesperson for Bonta said that this was caused by a miscommunication and that Bonta would return the money.

=== Eaton Fire ===
The Eaton Fire was a wildfire that burned in the Eaton Canyon of the San Gabriel Mountains in January 2025 and spread into nearby foothill communities, most notably Altadena. It killed 19 people and destroyed over 9,000 buildings, making it the second most destructive wildfire in California history.

The cause of the Eaton Fire is still under investigation, but witness reports and video evidence have connected it to transmission lines owned by Edison in the Eaton Canyon, and Edison has reported that a fault on its lines occurred at around the time the fire started. The Los Angeles Times reported that several months prior, regulators had criticized Edison for falling behind in inspecting transmission lines in high-risk areas and for failing to find dangerous problems in inspections. Furthermore, in the three years leading up to the fire, regulators had criticized Edison's practice of checking wind speed every ten minutes, arguing that this could fail to capture the severity of a situation and miss high gusts, in contrast to other nearby utilities that check wind speed every thirty seconds. In response, Edison has highlighted the existing work they have done to reduce wildfire risk, cautioned against jumping to conclusions, and suggested that a nearby homeless encampment may have been responsible for starting the fire. They also stated that they believe they acted prudently even if their lines were responsible for the fire. Lawyers representing fire victims have also criticized Edison for re-energizing the power lines under suspicion in mid-January; they argued that this was done to destroy physical evidence linking their equipment to the fire, while Edison argued that it was a necessary step to return power to customers.

Some victims of the fire, including people who lost homes and families of people who died in the fire, have sued SCE. Four lawsuits were filed on January 13, alleging that the company had "violated public safety and utility codes and was negligent in its handling of power safety shut-offs". On January 16, the family of a person who died in the fire sued SCE for wrongful death, also alleging negligence in SCE's failure to deactivate utilities despite a red flag warning being issued due to fast Santa Ana winds. Los Angeles County, Pasadena, and Sierra Madre also announced plans to sue Edison.

NPR has reported that while the fire was ongoing, Edison reactivated power lines despite firefighters requesting they keep them off. This resulted in downed power lines sparking new fires.

In September 2025, the U.S. Department of Justice sued Southern California Edison, claiming that the public utility company was at fault for the fire.

=== Other fires ===
Edison's equipment has also been found to be the cause of other fires, including the 2007 Malibu Canyon Fire, Liberty Fire, Meyers Fire, Rye Fire, Easy Fire, Bobcat Fire, Silverado Fire, Coastal Fire, the Fairview Fire, and possibly also the Hurst Fire and the Eaton Fire.

== See also ==
- Energy use in California
- Solar power plants in the Mojave Desert
- Wind power in California
