= Ice Energy =

United States based energy storage company

- Company type: Private
- Industry: Energy storage
- Founded: 2012
- Defunct: 2019
- Headquarters: Santa Barbara, California, United States
- Area served: California
- Key people: Marcel Christians (COO); Alex Collins (COO)
- Products: Ice Bear, Ice Cub num_employees =
- Website: ice-energy.com

Ice Energy is a thermal energy storage company serving utility companies in the U.S. state of California.

== Products ==
The company's products operate on the customer side of the electricity meter.

The Ice Bear serves small to mid-sized commercial buildings. It freezes water at night when electricity is cheaper and uses that ice for daytime space cooling.

The Ice Cub addresses residential applications.

== History ==
Ice Energy was founded in 2003. The assets of Ice Energy were reformed into Ice Energy Holdings in 2012. In August 2014, Ice Energy revealed a version of the Ice Bear for single-family homes called the Ice Cub. In November, the company won sixteen contracts with Southern California Edison. The contracts totaled 25.6 megawatts.

In December 2019, the company filed for Chapter 7 bankruptcy.

A reinvigorated version of the company began operating a 25.6 mwh energy storage program in southern California in 2020, supporting 100 customer sites. This program provided more than 45 GWh by October 2024. The company claimed that the program had reduced customer bills by 20%.

== See also ==
- Energy storage
- List of energy storage projects
