= María Elena Avila =

American entrepreneur, philanthropist, and civic leader

- Born: April 18, 1953 (age 71); Guanajuato, Mexico

María Elena Avila (born April 18, 1953) is a Mexican-born American entrepreneur, philanthropist and civic leader in California.

== Biography ==
The daughter of Salvador and Margarita Avila, she was born in a small village in Guanajuato and came to the United States with her family at the age of five. The family settled in the Huntington Park area and opened their first restaurant in 1966. In 1974, Avila opened her own first restaurant. With her brothers, she owns and operates the Avila's El Ranchito chain of restaurants in southern California and also operates a catering business.

She was a founding member of the Orange County Hispanic Education Endowment Fund and of the Latino Leadership Council. She has been the "madrina" (godmother) of the University of California at Irvine's Community Outreach Partnership Center since 2001. She has also served on a number of boards for local universities.
