= María Elena Delgado =

Mexican sculptor

- Known for: Sculpture

Maria Elena Delgado was a Mexican sculptor whose work was recognized with membership in the Salón de la Plástica Mexicana.

Her works are often in semi precious stone such as white, green or ochre onyx, black, white Mexican or Carrara marble, but she also worked in fine wood, bronze, fiberglass and other types of stone. It often suggests cones or cylinders, and is almost always rounded in some way. For a period, her work had a definite erotic aspect, with the aim of relating to love.
