= Maria Elena Lorenzo =

Owner of Afro-Mexican restaurant in Los Angeles

- Occupation: Cook, restaurant manager

Maria Elena Lorenzo is an Afro-Mexican cook specializing in native cuisine from Costa Chica of Guerrero, Mexico. She is most known for her restaurant Tamales Y Elena Antojitos, heralded as the first Guerrero-style Afro-Mexican restaurant in Los Angeles.

== Early life and career ==
Maria was born in Costa Chica of Guerrero, Mexico, a predominantly Afro-Mexican community. In 1992, Lorenzo and her husband Juan Irra moved to Los Angeles, California.

After coming to the U.S., Maria and Juan began to cook and sell their native Afro-Mexican style tamales from a small cart in the Watts neighborhood of Bell Gardens, California. Maria started off selling her tamales at the local Grape Street Elementary School and the Imperial courts housing projects, where her and her family resided. In 2007, Maria upgraded to a food truck which continued to serve the Watts neighborhood with an expanded menu.

In July 2020, Maria opened a restaurant called Tamales Y Elena Antojitos, specializing in Guerrero-style cuisine passed down through the Lorenzo family. Maria and her five daughters all work to cook and run the restaurant alongside the food truck, while Juan Irra helps supply restaurant goods. Tamales Y Elena Antojitos is most known for their tamales and moles, but also serves other traditional Guerrero-style food such as pozole, elopozole with elote, lengua stew, and chilate. It is heralded as the first Guerrero-style Afro-Mexican restaurant in Los Angeles.

In 2022, Lorenzo's Tamales Elena y Antojitos was featured in the Netflix series Taco Chronicles.
