= Stanton Battery Energy Storage =

Battery storage power station in Stanton, California

Stanton Battery Energy Storage (SBES)
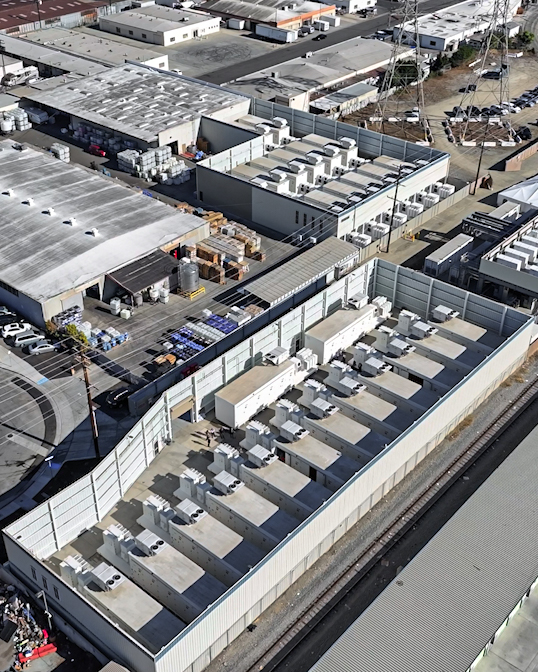
- The SBES power plant, located on two discontinuous parcels with the south parcel in the foreground and north parcel in the background. A portion of the separate Stanton Energy Reliability Center (SERC) 10MW BESS is visible on the right.
- Country: United States
- Location: Stanton, California
- Coordinates: 33°48′24.3864″N 117°59′15.4968″W
- Status: In operation
- Construction began: February, 2023
- Commission date: July, 2023
- Owners: W Power, LLC
- Operators: Wellhead Electric Company, Inc.

Power generation
- Storage capacity: 68.8 MW / 275.2 MWh

Stanton Battery Energy Storage (SBES) is a 68.8 MW / 275.2 MWh battery energy storage system (BESS) located in Stanton, California. The facility uses lithium-ion battery cells manufactured by Samsung and was, at the time of its completion, the 15th-largest standalone battery operating within the California Independent System Operator (CAISO) market.

The facility is operated by Wellhead Electric Company, a California-based Independent Power Producer (IPP). Wellhead also operates the physically adjacent Stanton Energy Reliability Center (SERC), a 98 MW natural gas-fired simple cycle power plant with accompanying 10 MW BESS. Stanton Battery Energy Storage was developed in part to allow for the phase-out of the natural gas portion of the existing SERC facility, which currently operates infrequently only as a peaker plant.

== Development ==
Construction on Stanton Battery Energy Storage began in February, 2023 and lasted 5 months. The facility reached its commercial operation date (COD) in July, 2023. Energy Storage technology company Energy Vault provided the Engineering, Procurement, and Construction (EPC) services and Energy Management System software for the project.

A $60 million investment tax credit (ITC) transfer for the project was completed by W Power, LLC, and Wellhead in November 2023. As a result, SBES was among the first projects to benefit from the Inflation Reduction Act of 2022 having expanded the ITC to include standalone energy storage.

An official ribbon-cutting ceremony was held for the facility on December 6, 2023.
