= María Elena Solar Power Plant =

Solar power plant in María Elena

- Thermosolar plant
- Country: Chile
- Location: Antofagasta
- Coordinates: 22°10′S 69°25′W
- Status: Project approved

Solar farm
- Type: CSP
- CSP technology: Solar power tower

Power generation
- Units operational: 4
- Nameplate capacity: 400 MW
- Annual net output: 110 GWh

María Elena Solar Power Plant (Spanish: Planta Termosolar María Elena) is a concentrated solar power plant with a molten-salt technology system that is currently under construction in the commune of María Elena in the Antofagasta Region of Chilé.

The María Elena complex will be made up of four separate 100 MW plants, for a total capacity of 400 MW, and will supply the northern SING (Sistema Interconectado del Norte Gande) grid via a 17.5 km, 220 kV double circuit transmission line connected to the Encuentro substation. The $3.6 billion thermosolar plant will be the largest plant of its kind in the world. The project is being developed by Ibereólica Solar Atacama, a subsidiary of Madrid-based Grupo Ibereólica. It will employ 1,500 workers during the construction stage and 200 as permanent staff when in operation. Construction will take 27 months so the plant will be operational in July 2016 at the earliest.

== See also ==
- Solar power in Chile
- Energy in Chile
- List of solar thermal power stations
- Atacama Desert
