= Redstone Solar Thermal Power =

Planned solar power tower solar thermal power plant

- Country: South Africa
- Location: Postmasburg (Tsantsabane), ZF Mgcawu District Municipality, Northern Cape Province
- Coordinates: 28°18′S 23°21′E
- Status: Commissioned
- Construction began: 2021
- Commission date: May 2025
- Construction cost: $715 million
- Owner: ACWA Power

Solar farm
- Type: CSP
- CSP technology: Solar power tower

Power generation
- Units planned: 1
- Nameplate capacity: 100 MW
- Capacity factor: 54.8% (planned)
- Annual net output: 480 GW·h (planned)
- Storage capacity: 1,200 MW·h_{e}

External links
- Website: redstone csp ipp

Redstone Solar Thermal Power (RSTP) is a solar power tower with molten salt energy storage, located in Postmasburg, near Kimberley, in the Northern Cape Region of South Africa. Redstone will have a capacity of 100 megawatts (MW) to deliver power to 200,000 people and was awarded in bid window 3.5 of the REIPPP at a strike price of 122.3 ZAR/KWh including time of day pricing in 2015. The project was initially based on the technology of now bankrupt Solar Reserve, but was delayed for several years because the PPA was not signed by Eskom until 2018. After the project was revived, the plant was put under construction, until May 2025 when it was connected to the grid for the first time after 4 years of construction. The technology is provided by Brightsource and John Cockerill, as demonstrated in the Noor Energy 1 project in the UAE.

== Announcement in 2015 ==
In January 2015, the South Africa Department of Energy awarded the RSTP project to a consortium led by SolarReserve and the Arabian Company for Water and Power Development (ACWA Power). The project was to achieve financial close at end of 2015 and commence operations in early 2018. Overall project cost were estimated at $715 million, and basic power tariff offered at $124/MW·h. Peak power tariff is 270% of the basic power tariff i.e. $334/MW·h. Tariffs quoted in Rands, fully indexed, were R1.70/kWh base rate and R4.58/kWh peak rate (2015 rate). The RSTP project would create 800 direct jobs during construction, with a planned 30-year operating life.

== Technology ==
The RSTP project features a 2-tank direct molten salt energy storage with 12 hours of full-load energy storage, namely 1200 MW·h of equivalent power production, avoiding any backup fuel requirement. The RSTP project is located adjacent the 75 MW Lesedi and 96 MW Jasper photovoltaic solar power projects. Together the three projects comprise a combined CSP and PV solar park with a total 271 MW of generating capacity.

== Delay since 2016 ==
In early 2016, the power purchase agreement (PPA) worth R50 billion with Eskom was postponed because of a generation surplus.

In April 2018, the purchase power agreement (PPA) with Eskom was signed. In August 2019, it was reported that financing for Redstone was complete.

It is unclear what the bankruptcy of technology provider SolarReserve in 2020 means for the project. On 10 May 2021 ACWA Power announced the achievement of financial close, with commercial operations expected to commence in Q4 2023. ACWA Power appointed Chinese company SEPCO3 to finish construction on the project.

The facility's tower was eventually completed in 2024, reaching a height of 248 meters. However, not all of the planned 40,000 heliostats surrounding the tower had been constructed at this point. Synchronization onto the national grid was then expected to take place in September 2024.

== See also ==
- List of solar thermal power stations
- List of power stations in South Africa
- Solar thermal energy
- Crescent Dunes Solar Energy Project
