= Copiapó Solar Project =

Solar thermal power project

- Official name: Proyecto Copiapó Solar
- Country: Chile
- Location: Copiapó, Atacama Region
- Coordinates: 27°21′S 70°19′W
- Status: Proposed
- Commission date: 2019 (planned)
- Construction cost: $2 billion
- Owner: Copiapó Energía Solar SpA

Solar farm
- Type: CSP
- CSP technology: Solar power tower

Power generation
- Units planned: 2 x 120 MW, 1 x 150 MW (PV)
- Nameplate capacity: 390 MW
- Capacity factor: 49.8% (planned)
- Annual net output: 1,700 GW·h (planned)
- Storage capacity: 3,360 MW·h_{e}

External links
- Website: www.solarreserve.com
- Priced at ¢6.3/kWh ($63/MWh)

The Copiapó Solar Project is a 390 megawatt (MW) net solar thermal power project to be located near Copiapó, about 65 kilometers east of the coastal town of Caldera. The project is being developed by SolarReserve, and is scheduled to reach commercial operation in 2019.

The Copiapó project will comprise two 120 megawatt (MW), 130 MW gross) solar thermal towers with up to 14 hours thermal storage, combined with 150 MW of PV. The hybrid project will deliver over 1,700 gigawatt-hours (GW·h) annually, as non-intermittent baseload power, 24 hours a day. The project uses heliostat mirrors that collect and focus the sun's thermal energy to heat molten salt flowing through a solar power tower. The molten salt circulates from the tower to a storage tank, where it is then used to produce steam and generate electricity. Excess thermal energy is stored in the molten salt and can be used to generate power for up to fourteen hours, including during the evening hours and when direct sunlight is not available. The project's solar tower component technology is based on the SolarReserve Crescent Dunes Solar Energy Project in the US.

The project is expected to cost $2 billion.

The Copiapó Solar project was submitted to a full environmental assessment under the Chilean system of Environmental Impact Assessment (SEIA) administered by the Department of Environmental Assessment (SEA), and received an Environmental Qualification Resolution (RCA), as it is called the Chilean environmental permit, on August 19, 2015.

The hybrid concept combines two or more energy conversion mechanisms, that when integrated, overcome limitations inherent in either. The purpose is to provide a high level of energy security and reliability through the integrated mix of complementary generation methods. Specifically, photovoltaics, to date, has a lower cost if one ignores the dispatchability question, that instead is solved by the solar thermal component.

At the 2017-01 auction, SolarReserve bid $63/MWh for 24-hour CSP power with no subsidies, competing with other types such as LNG gas turbines. And in the following auction they bid less than 5 ¢/kWh.

A photovoltaic project with the same name was planned in 2025. The numbers are 357 MW with a 320 MW / 1.28 GWh battery, delivering 750 GWh per year from 2026 for 15 years to mining company CAP Group, funded by $475 million.

== See also ==
- Atacama Desert
- List of solar thermal power stations
- Solar power in Chile
- Solar thermal energy
