= RSTP =

RSTP or Rstp may refer to:

- Rapid Spanning Tree Protocol, a computer network protocol
- Redstone Solar Thermal Power, a solar power tower in South Africa
- Rstp (Restrepia), an orchid genus

== See also ==
- Real-Time Streaming Protocol (RTSP), an application-level network protocol
