= Solar power in Chile =

- Installed capacity: 11.05 GW (2024) (19th)
- Annual generation: 19.92 TWh (2024)
- Capacity per capita: 592 W (2024)
- Share of electricity: 25.1% (2025)

Solar power in Chile is an increasingly important source of energy. Total installed photovoltaic (PV) capacity in Chile reached 11.05 GW in 2023. In 2025, solar energy generated 19.92 TWh of electricity in Chile, accounting for 25.1% of total national electricity grid generation, compared to less than 0.1% in 2013.

In October 2015 Chile's Ministry of Energy announced its "Roadmap to 2050: A Sustainable and Inclusive Strategy", which planned for 19% of the country's electricity to be from solar energy, 23% wind power, and 29% hydroelectric power.

In November 2024, Chile's solar power generation capacity was projected to quadruple until 2060, in order to help decarbonize Chile's electricity generation. Energy storage is expected to play a key role by storing a excess electricity generated during the day and releasing it at night. Due to its high solar potential, solar power developments will likely grow most in the north. Solar generation is expected to contribute 46% of Chile's electricity in 2060.

The Catholic University of the North has a leading position in Chile and South America in solar power research. The origin of this research dates back to the early days of the university in the late 1950s and 1960s when a group young researchers dubbed the heliocistas proposed research into solar power in defiance to nuclear power research that was in vougue then. In the 2010s, the development of new more efficient solar power technologies in conjunction with the Fukushima nuclear accident of 2011 cemented the government position in favouring solar power and dissipated a previous pressure that had built to push for nuclear power in Chile.

== Solar resource ==
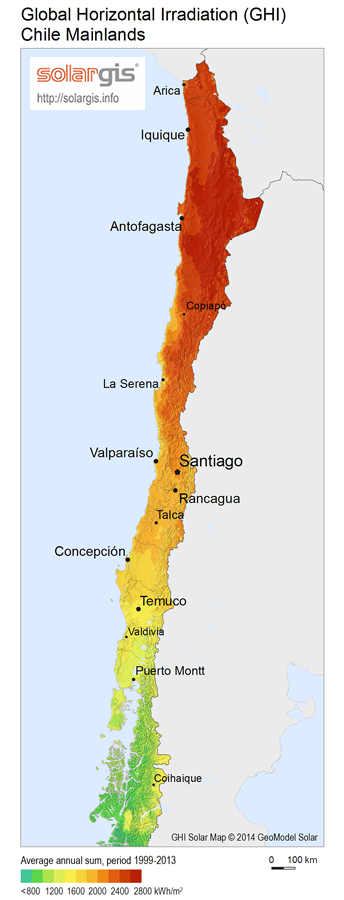
Solar irradiation map of Chile

Northern Chile has the highest solar incidence in the world.

Source: NREL

== Photovoltaics, annual capacity ==
Chile photovoltaics capacity (MWp)
End of the year	Installed capacity operating	Under construction	Presented for environmental assessment
2011	0	1	<769
2012	2	2.5	4,109
2013	6.7	128	8,184
2014	362	983	12,559
2015	750	2380	15,769
2023	8500	7729	?

== Early photovoltaics projects ==
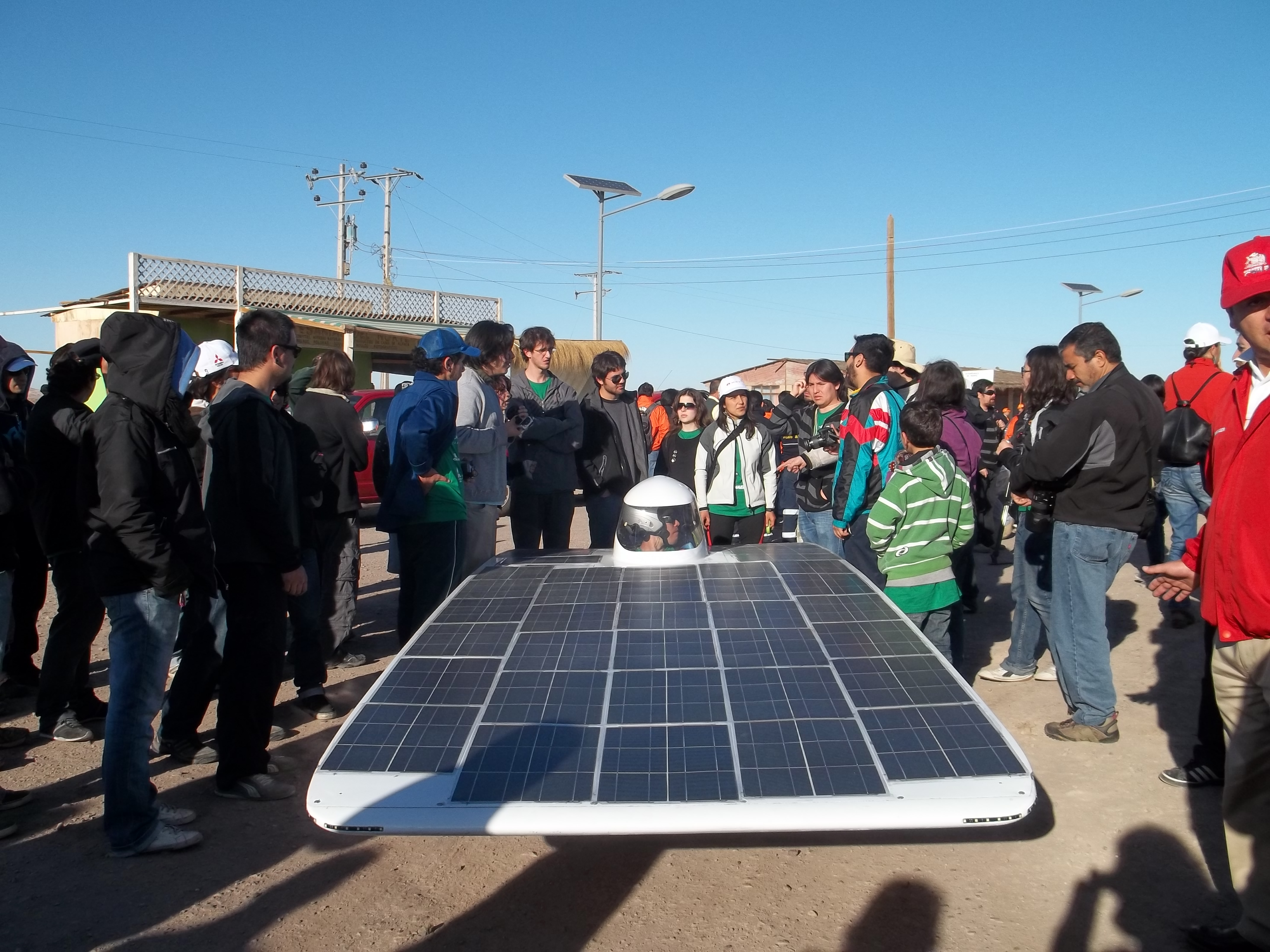
Solar car developed by the University of Chile

In June 2014, the 100-megawatt (MW) Amanecer Solar CAP, a photovoltaic power plant located near Copiapó in the Atacama Desert was inaugurated. It was developed by the company with the same name, Amanecer Solar CAP, and was the largest in Latin America at the time. It is capable of generating 270 gigawatt-hours (GWh) of electricity per year.

The 70 MW photovoltaic Salvador Solar Park went online in November 2014, followed by an official inauguration ceremony on 23 January 2015. It was expected to produce 200 GWh of electricity per year. The plant is located approximately 5 kilometres south of El Salvador, in the Atacama region. It is one of the first in the world to supply competitively priced solar energy to the open market without government subsidy.

The 60 MW photovoltaic Lalackama I plant went online in 2014 and is expected to produce 160 GWh of electricity per year. The nearby 18 MW Lalackama II plant went online in May 2015 and is capable of generating approximately 50 GWh per year. Both plants feature photovoltaic inverters designed and manufactured by Elettronica Santerno, an Italian company.

The 141 MW photovoltaic Luz Del Norte (Light of the North) plant, located 58 kilometres northeast of the city of Copiapó in the Atacama region, began construction in October 2014 and is scheduled for completion in December 2015. It uses more than 1.7 million cadmium telluride modules. The first two blocks of this project (approximately half of the project's total capacity) was connected to Chile's central power grid in October 2015. The plant supplies ancillary grid services.

The 79 MW Pampa Norte PV solar plant began operating in April 2016 at a site 32 kilometres southwest of Taltal in Chile's Antofagasta Region. It uses approximately 258,000 polycrystalline silicon photovoltaic modules and is capable of generating more than 200 GWh per year. The plant was developed by Enel Green Power and features photovoltaic inverters designed and manufactured by Elettronica Santerno.

The 97 MW Carrera Pinto photovoltaic plant is located 60 kilometres from the city of Copiapó in the Atacama Region. The first 20 MW of the plant was connected to the grid in early January 2016, with the remaining 77 MW connected in August 2016. The plant is capable of generating over 260 GWh per year.

The 246 MW El Romero single-axis tracking solar photovoltaic plant began operating in November 2016 at Vallenar in the Atacama region, with a 493 GWh annual average output. It was the largest solar farm in Latin America when it opened. It uses 776,000 polycrystalline silicon photovoltaic modules. The solar irradiance has been measured at 853 W/m2.

In 2016, SolarPack won an electricity auction by bidding $29.1/MWh; a record low price. In March 2020, PV Magazine reported that Solarpack had begun providing power on 2 March 2020, to the Chilean grid from its 123 MW Granja project, 10 months ahead of the contracted date of 1 January 2021. With that, Solarpack raised its total operating capacity in Chile at the time to 181 MW.

== Solar thermal power ==
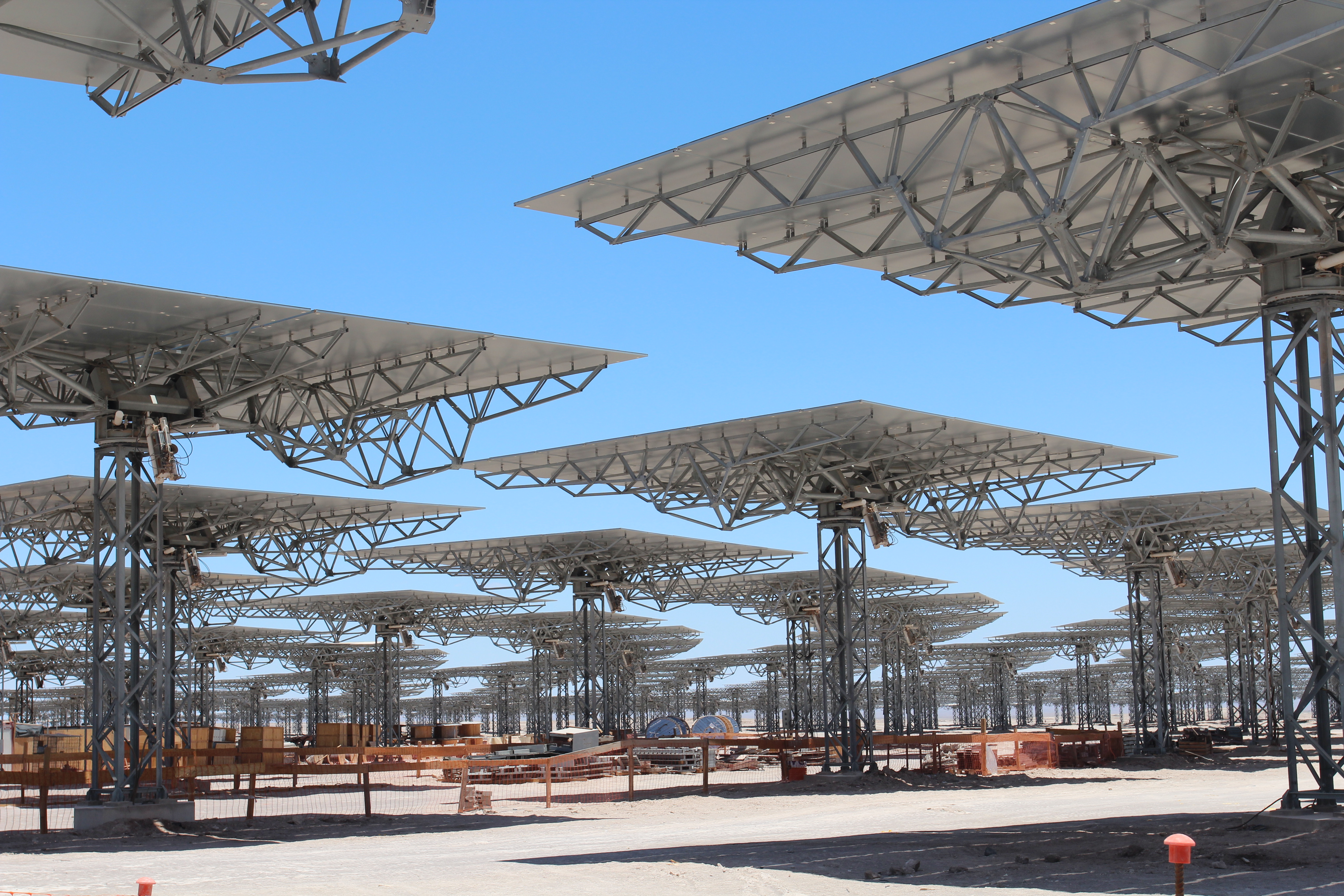
Heliostats at Cerro Dominador Solar Thermal Plant

In 2013 the Atacama 1 solar complex was proposed as a 110 MW solar thermal electric plant (the first in Latin America) and a 100 MW photovoltaic plant. The solar thermal plant will include 17.5 hours of thermal storage. These technologies complement each other to supply clean and stable energy 24 hours a day. The complex is located in the commune of María Elena, Segunda Región. Construction of the solar thermal electric plant commenced in 2014 and the plant was scheduled to begin operating in the second quarter of 2017, but got delayed significantly. Construction of the photovoltaic plant commenced in January 2015 and the plant began operating in June 2016 with 160 MW of panels, the largest solar plant in Chile at the time. By the end of 2020 the project was fully erected under the name Cerro Dominador Solar Thermal Plant and is expected to fully operate in 2021.

Because of its good solar resource several international companies have bid record low prices for solar thermal power plants in Chile, including the Copiapó Solar Project bid at $63/MWh by SolarReserve in 2017. If realized this would have been the lowest ever price for a CSP project in the world. Several CSP projects are under development in Chile, but in the absence of technology specific support policies Cerro Dominador is the only one under construction, yet.

== Batteries ==
Some solar facilities also have batteries connected, as they can deliver power after sunset when prices are higher. By August 2025, Chile had 4.6 GWh of battery energy capacity. In 2024 and 2025, around 6 TWh/year of electricity was curtailed (mainly solar in the north) due to insufficient transmission, an increase from 2.7 TWh in 2023.

Oasis de Atacama is a multi-site project with up to 2 GW of solar power and 11 GWh of storage. By early 2025, the first phases (Quillagua and Víctor Jara) were being tested, using lithium iron phosphate (LFP) batteries, and 4 phases operated by 2026.

=== Operating ===
Largest battery storage power plants by storage capacity
Name	Commissioning date	Energy (MWh)	Power (MW)	Duration (hours)	Type	Solar plant (MW)	Location/coords	Notes and refs
Elena (Oasis de Atacama)	2026	3000	430	7	LFP	446	María Elena 22.21°S 69.52°W	solar at night
Víctor Jara (Oasis de Atacama)	2026	1300	200	6	LFP	231	Tarapacá Region	
Quillagua (Oasis de Atacama)	2026	1200	200	6	LFP	221	María Elena 21.66°S 69.5°W	
Gabriela (Oasis de Atacama)	2026	1100	220	5		272		3 km above sea level
Arena	2026	1100	220	5		0	Antofagasta	
Cristales		1020	340			288	Antofagasta	
Chaca	2026	912	228	4				
Sol del Desierto	2025	800	200	4	Lithium-ion	244	María Elena 22.206°S 69.567°W	Electric busses
Tocopilla	2026	660	116	5			22.1°S 70.21°W	
Andes Solar IV	2024	650	130	5	Lithium-ion	211	Calama	
Coya	2024	638	139	4.5		181	María Elena 22.26°S 69.48°W	
Andes Solar II-b	2023	560	112	5	Lithium-ion	180	Antofagasta 24.02°S 68.58°W	
Andes III-a	2026	514	171	3		171	Antofagasta	
Tamaya	2025	418	68	6		114	Antofagasta 22.16°S 70.09°W	replaces diesel
Kallpa	2026	285	57	5		344 wind	Taltal	923 GWh/year
Capricornio	2025	264	48	5		88	Antofagasta23.42°S 70.18°W	
Salvador	2023	250	50	5		68	Diego de Almagro26.314°S 69.87°W	
San Andrés	2024	175	35	5		50	Atacama 27.255°S 70.105°W	
Arica	2026	150	25	6			Arica	$51 million
Bolero	2026	438	146			146	Sierra Gorda 23.47°S 69.41°W	$113m, 220kV
El Manzano	2025	134	67	2		99	Tiltil	
template	2026	100				31	[[]]	

=== Under construction ===
Largest battery power plants under construction
Name	Planned commissioning date	Energy (MWh)	Power (MW)	Duration (hours)	Type	Solar plant (MW)	Location	Refs
Mesembria	2025	1607						
Patache		1500	300	5			Tarapacá	
Pampas		1360	340	4		229 MW + 128 MW wind	Antofagasta	
CEME1-Dune	2026	1334	333	4		480	María Elena 22.37°S 69.59°W	Codelco
	2026	1000				220	Tarapacá	
Malgarida	2027	1000	200	5		238	Diego de Almagro26.27°S 69.96°W	
Libélula		960	199	5		151	Colina and Tiltil	
Monte Águila	2027	960				340	Cabrero, Chile	$300 million cost
Gran Teno	2027	939	241	4			[[]]	
Colbún/Celda	2026	912	228	4			Camarones 18.88°S 70.16°W	
Diego de Almagro Sur	2027	912+32	228	4	LFP	232	Diego de Almagro 26.588°S 69.96°W	
Libélula	2026		199			151	Colina y Tiltil	$310 million
Térmico de Mejillones	2026	800	140	6			Mejillones 23.087°S 70.406°W	$174 million
Pampina	2025	700	175	4		186	María Elena 22.38°S 69.59°W	Codelco
Luna de Verano	2027	600	300	2		82	Vallenar	
Atacama II		600	150	4				
Luz del Norte	2026	423	141	2				
Granja	2026	420	105	4		123	Tarapacá 20.813°S 69.487°W	
Azabache	2026	372	94	4		58 + 36 MW wind	Calama	
Maitenes	2026	360	90	4		131	O'Higgins Region	
Huatacondo	2026	312	98	3	LFP	103	Tarapacá 21.13°S 69.47°W	
Arenales	2026	900	300	3		0		
Los Loros	2026	230	46	5			Tierra Amarilla	$64 million
Las Salinas	2026	800	205			solar, 112 MW wind	Sierra Gorda, Antofagasta 22.85°S 68.95°W	
	2026	100				31	[[]]	

=== Planned ===
Largest battery storage power plants planned
Name	Planned commissioning date	Energy (MWh)	Power (MW)	Duration (hours)	Type	Solar plant (MW)	Location/coords	Refs
Antofagasta ERNC/HREP	2027	4950	990	5		1200 solar&wind	Antofagasta	
Llanura		3830				1000 MW + 150 MW wind	Antofagasta	Llullaillaco 500 kV line
Kanut	2027	1900	380	5			La Ligua	
Estepa	2027	1672	418	4		215	María Elena 22.247°S 69.56°W	450 GWh/year. $510 million
Black	2027	1400	350	4			Camarones	$220 million
La Isla	2027	1250	250	5	LFP	0	Llay-Llay	
Los Boldos	2027	1236	252	4.5		300	Petorca Province	
Terrazas	2027	1240				280	Coquimbo	
Monte Águila	2027	1100				340	[[]]	
Pampino	2029	1000				170	Pozo Almonte	
Huañil	2027	1000	200	5		31	Salamanca, Chile	$188 million
Plus Energía Camarones	2028	1000	200	5			Coquimbo	$350 million
El Romero	2028	980	196	5		246	Vallenar	
Melipilla	2026	922	120	7			Melipilla	
Nueva Pozo Almonte substation	2026	762	190	4	LFP	0	Pozo Almonte 20.32°S 69.7°W	
Cabo Leones	202x	680	170	4		192 wind	Atacama	
Freirina	202x	680	170	4		165 wind	Atacama	
Domeyko		660	300	2		83		
Hemera	2026	541	90	6		94	Río Claro	
Pradera Larga	202x	450	90	5		84	Valparaíso	
Planchón	2027	400	108	3.5			[[]]	
Llanos de Rungue - Halcón 9		367	69	4		280	Andacollo	
Copiapó Solar Project	2026	1280/932	340/320	4		357/330	Copiapó	750 GWh/year
Polpaico	2026	300					Til Til	
Dorado	2027	300	60	5		Quinta de Tilcoco substation	Quinta de Tilcoco	
Quinquimo	2026	200	90	2	Lithium-ion	90	Valparaíso32.45°S 71.28°W	
Tamango	2027	168			49		[[]]	
	2026	100				31	[[]]	(template)

== See also ==
- Renewable energy in Chile
- List of photovoltaic power stations
- Solar power by country
- Growth of photovoltaics

== Bibliography ==
- Arenas Coronil, Carlos (2025). "El aporte de las universidades, Cámara Chilena de la Construcción y la Secretaría Regional Ministerial de Energía , al desarrollo energético del norte de Chile (1975-2018)". In Arenas Coronil, Carlos (ed.). Historia de la Energía en la Región del Sol (in Spanish). RIL Editores. pp. 285–360. ISBN 978-956--01-1706-9.
- Alfaro Malatesta, Sergio (2025). "Aproximaciones a la energía solar en la Universidad del Norte, las opciones de investigación y desarrollo en la disyuntiva entre la energía atómica o el camino hacia la energía solar y el sueño del litio". In Arenas Coronil, Carlos (ed.). Historia de la Energía en la Región del Sol (in Spanish). RIL Editores. pp. 199–231. ISBN 978-956--01-1706-9.
