= SolarReserve =

American developer of utility-scale solar power projects

SolarReserve, LLC
- Company type: Private
- Industry: Solar thermal power
- Founded: 2008; 18 years ago
- Defunct: 2020
- Headquarters: Santa Monica, California, U.S.
- Key people: Tom Georgis (CEO); Bill Gould(CTO)
- Website: SolarReserve.com (archived)

SolarReserve was a developer of utility-scale solar power projects which include Concentrated Solar Power (CSP) and Photovoltaic (PV) technology. The company commercialized solar thermal energy storage technology that enables solar power tower CSP plants to deliver electricity day and night. In this technology, a molten salt is used to capture the energy from the sun and store it. When electricity is needed, the stored liquid salt is used to turn water into steam to turn a turbine and generate electricity.

As of May 2015, SolarReserve has developed and secured long-term power contracts for 482 megawatts (MW) of solar projects representing $2.8 billion of project capital, with a development pipeline of more than 6.6 gigawatts (GW) globally. SolarReserve reached its lowest price yet at ¢6.3/kWh for the 2019 Copiapó Solar Project. By 2020, the company had ceased operations. An affiliate of SolarReserve filed a lawsuit to inspect the books of Tonopah Solar Energy LLC, a power plant project SolarReserve invested but ended losing control. A Delaware judged rule rejected SolarReserve's affiliate claim.

== History ==
SolarReserve was formed in early 2008 with seed capital from US Renewables Group, in partnership with United Technologies Corporation (UTC), to commercialize advanced molten salt technology for utility-scale concentrated solar thermal power. This technology was first developed and tested by Rocketdyne for two decades and had more than 100 US and international patents. In September 2008, the company raised an additional $140 million in a Series B funding.

In 2014, SolarReserve acquired ownership from Rocketdyne of its intellectual property rights and patents specifically for molten salt technology for concentrated solar-thermal power and electricity storage, heliostat designs and collector field control systems. By 2020, the website was no longer active.

== Projects ==
=== Crescent Dunes Solar Energy Project ===
The 110 MW Crescent Dunes Solar Energy Project is the world’s first utility-scale facility to use molten salt power tower energy storage. It has 10,347 tracking mirrors (heliostats) that follow the sun and reflect and concentrate sunlight onto a heat exchanger, a receiver, atop a 640-foot (200 m) tower. Crescent Dunes has 10 hours of storage and was to deliver 500,000 MW hours of electricity per year, day and night, to 75,000 homes. In September, 2011, SolarReserve received a $737 million loan guarantee from the U.S. Department of Energy (DOE) for the project and broke ground. The project had a 25-year agreement with NV Energy for 100 percent of the electricity, but after multiple failures of its molten salt storage tanks, one resulting in an eight month outage, it was terminated by NV Energy in October 2019 due to the project having "failed to produce." Alleging a takeover by the DOE, SolarReserve has raised the possibility of this project filing for bankruptcy. The company canceled another Nevada project in 2019.

=== Redstone Solar Thermal Power Project ===
The Redstone Solar Thermal Power Project is a planned 100 MW solar project located at Postmasburg, near Kimberly, South Africa. The project will have 12 hours of storage to deliver to more than 200,000 South African homes. In May 2019, it was reported that financing for Redstone was almost complete.

=== Aurora Solar Thermal Power Project ===
The Aurora Solar Thermal Power Project was a 150MW solar thermal plant proposed to be built about 30 kilometres (19 mi) north of Port Augusta in South Australia. The project was expected to cost AUD $650 million and was to be completed by 2020. The promised power delivery price is noted to be competitive with combined-cycle natural-gas plants.

On 5 April 2019, South Australian Energy Minister Dan van Holst Pellekaan announced the cancellation of the project. The project may continue with other companies.

=== Copiapó Solar Project ===
The Copiapó Solar Project near Copiapó, Atacama Region, Chile is a 260 MW hybrid solar power project consisting of CSP and PV energy. It will have 14 hours of storage to deliver to more than 560,000 homes in Atacama. The project is the first of its kind in Chile and will be the largest solar power plant in the world. At the 2017 auction, SolarReserve bid $63/MWh (¢6.3/kWh) for 24-hour CSP power with no subsidies, competing with other types such as LNG gas turbines.

=== Photovoltaic ===
1. Lesedi Solar Energy Project
2. Letsatsi Solar Energy Project
3. Jasper Solar Energy Project

== See also ==
- Concentrated solar power
- Energy storage
- List of concentrating solar thermal power companies
- List of energy storage projects
