= Jasper Solar Energy Project =

Photovoltaic power station in South Africa

- Country: South Africa
- Location: Between Postmasburg and Kimberley, Northern Cape
- Coordinates: 28°17′53″S 23°21′56″E
- Status: Operational
- Commission date: 2014
- Construction cost: US$260 million

Solar farm
- Type: Standard PV

Power generation
- Nameplate capacity: 96 MW_{p} (75 MW_{AC})
- Annual net output: 180 GWh

The Jasper Solar Energy Project (or Jasper PV Project) is a 96 megawatt (MW) photovoltaic power station, located 120 km west of Kimberley, in South Africa's Northern Cape. Construction of the project was completed in October 2014 and it is fully operational to power up to 80,000 homes.

Google has a recent history of investing in wind and solar power, and since 2010 has committed to more than US$1 billion in renewable energy projects worldwide. Until 2013 little of this was spent on renewable energy in Africa. A new $12 million investment in the Jasper power project, at a project cost of approximately ZAR2.3 billion ($260 million) signals a change in policy. It is one of the largest solar installations in Africa, comprising over 325,000 PV modules.

== Background ==
Since 2008 South African households and industry endure rolling blackouts due to a severe lack of generating capacity. Only since then has the government been active in looking at new potential sources of electricity. These incentives led to South Africa having the highest growth in clean energy investment in the world in 2012. While it is dependent on fossil fuels, its generous resources of wind and sun have made it opportune to diversify and to set itself the goal of installing 18 gigawatts of renewable energy capacity by 2030.

SolarReserve, a developer of large-scale solar energy projects, joined forces with the Kensani Group and Intikon Energy, two South African companies, to develop three photovoltaic (PV) solar energy projects in South Africa. This consortium was awarded preferred bidder status in May 2012 by the South Africa Department of Energy. SolarReserve is busy on two other 75 megawatt projects, Letsatsi and Lesedi. The consortium closed the $260-million contract with investments coming from Google, the government's Public Investment Corporation (PIC), the Development Bank of Southern Africa and the PEACE Humansrus Trust. SolarReserve appointed SgurrEnergy as technical advisor on the projects involving the Letsatsi PV plant at Soutdrif north of Bloemfontein and Lesedi PV plant at Humansrus east of Postmasburg.

== See also ==
- List of power stations in South Africa
