= Aurora Solar Thermal Power Project =

- Country: Australia
- Location: South Australia
- Coordinates: 32.2°S 137.6°E
- Status: Proposed
- Construction cost: A$650M
- Operators: SolarReserve (until 2019); 1414 Degrees (from 2019)

Solar farm
- Type: Flat-panel PV
- CSP technology: Solar power tower

Power generation
- Units cancelled: 1
- Nameplate capacity: 70–400 (proposed)
- Annual net output: 495 GW·h (planned)
- Storage capacity: 1,200 MW·h_{e} (cancelled)

External links
- Website: Official website (until 2019); Official website (from 2019)

Aurora Solar Thermal Power Project was a planned solar power tower solar thermal power plant to be located north of Port Augusta in South Australia. It aimed to generate 150 MW of electricity upon completion in 2020, with storage capacity sufficient for up to 8 hours of full power operation. The facility was projected to produce 495 GWh of electricity annually and was to be situated 30 kilometres (19 miles) north of Port Augusta at Carriewerloo Station.

On April 5, 2019, South Australian Energy Minister Dan van Holst Pellekaan announced the cancellation of the project.

== Project announcement and original timeline ==
Then premier of South Australia, Jay Weatherill announced in August 2017 that construction would begin in 2018 and was expected to be completed in 2020. It was expected to cost A$650M to build, including a A$110M loan from the Federal Government. SolarReserve had a contract to supply all of the electricity required by the state government's offices from this power project.

The plant received formal development approval from the state government in January 2018. At that time, finance was not yet all in place, but SolarReserve still anticipated starting construction in mid-2018 and taking 650 workers two and a half years to build it.

On 5 April 2019, South Australian Energy Minister Dan van Holst Pellekaan announced that he had been contacted by SolarReserve who said the project would not be going ahead.

== Purchase and subsequent reboot of the project ==
In December 2019, local South Australian renewable energy company 1414 Degrees (ASX: 14D) announced it had acquired the project from SolarReserve, along with SolarReserve's early-stage solar PV projects in NSW. 1414 Degrees renamed the site Aurora Solar Energy Project, indicating it would develop the site as a solar photovoltaic farm firmed up using their proprietary GRID-TESS thermal energy storage system using molten silicon.

In May 2020, it announced that the first stage would open in mid-2021 with 70MW of solar panels, followed by a pilot Thermal Energy Storage System (TESS). However, by June 2020 the thermal storage lacked maturity and the project was reshaped with a bigger battery (140 MW/280 MWh), 70MW of solar PV and 150MW of concentrated solar power (CSP), to be constructed in 2023.

== Reasons for the original cancellation of the project ==
Tim Buckley, the Director of Energy Finance Studies for the anti-fossil fuel Institute for Energy Economics and Financial Analysis, said that the most likely reason for the cancellation was a lack of revenue certainty for the technical demonstrator project. The Aurora plant had the capability of firming up variable renewables by providing stored power from hot salt after the sun had gone down and solar photovoltaic panels had stopped generation but, according to Buckley, there was probably no long-term contract on offer to provide for a fixed price for electricity from the plant, particularly during the evening peak hours of 6 pm to 8 pm. He suggests that this was due to an apparent lack of a government policy framework and a lack of “time of day” electricity pricing.

South Australian opposition leader Peter Malinauskas blamed the failure to secure finance on the state government's plan to establish a new electricity interconnector to New South Wales. This interconnector was expected to reduce the peak wholesale cost of electricity.
