= Crescent Dunes Solar Energy Project =

Solar power station in Nevada, United States

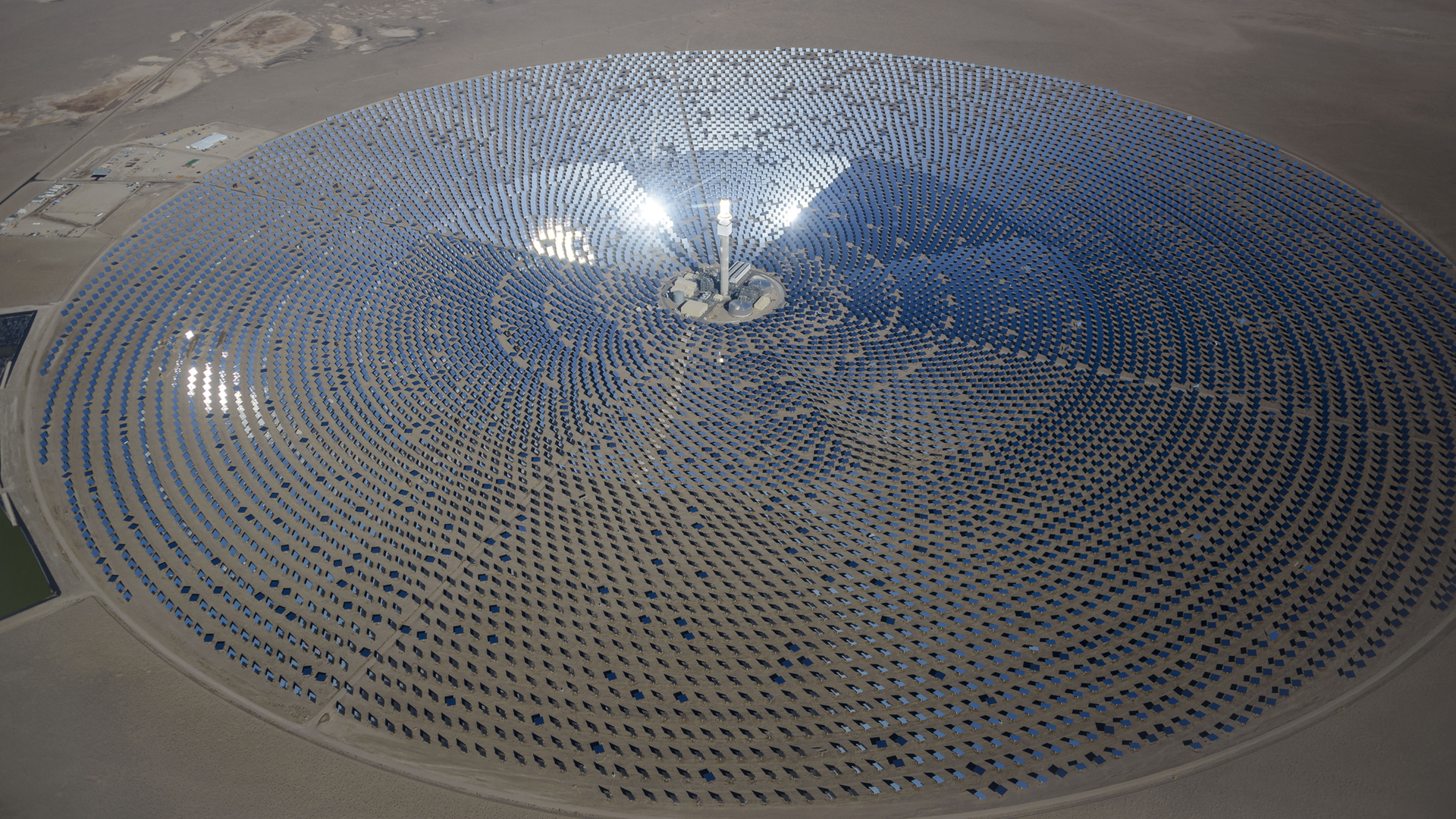
- Country: United States
- Location: Tonopah, Nye County, Nevada
- Coordinates: 38°14′00″N 117°22′01″W
- Status: Post-bankruptcy reorganization, restart
- Construction began: 2011; 15 years ago
- Commission date: 2016; 10 years ago
- Construction cost: $975 million
- Owners: Tonopah Solar Energy, LLC (SolarReserve, LLC)
- Operator: Vinci SA

Solar farm
- Type: CSP
- CSP technology: Solar power tower
- Collectors: 10347 × 115.72 m^{2}
- Total collector area: 296 acres (1,200,000 m^{2})
- Site resource: 2,685 kW·h/m^{2}/yr
- Site area: 1,670 acres (676 ha)

Power generation
- Units operational: 1
- Make and model: Alstom
- Nameplate capacity: 110 MW
- Capacity factor: 51.9% (planned); 20.3% (2018)
- Annual net output: 196 GW·h over 1 year (2018)
- Storage capacity: 1,100 MW·h_{e}

External links
- Website: Crescent Dunes
- Commons: Related media on Commons

The Crescent Dunes Solar Energy Project is a solar thermal power project with an installed capacity of 110 megawatts (MW) and 1.1 gigawatt-hours of energy storage located near Tonopah, about 190 miles (310 km) northwest of Las Vegas. Crescent Dunes is the first commercial concentrated solar power (CSP) plant with a central receiver tower and advanced molten salt energy storage technology at full scale (110 MW), following the experimental Solar Two and Gemasolar in Spain at 50 MW. As of 2023, it is operated by its new owner, Vinci SA, and in a new contract with NV Energy, it now supplies solar energy at night only, drawing on thermal energy stored each day.

Startup energy venture company SolarReserve (created via seed funding), US Renewables Group, and United Technologies were the original owners of Tonopah Solar Energy LLC, the owner and operator of the Crescent Dunes plant. The Crescent Dunes project was subsequently backed by $737 million in U.S. government loan guarantees and by Tonopah partnering with Cobra Thermosolar Plants, Inc. The overall venture had a projected cost of less than $1 billion. The plant suffered several design, construction and technical problems and, having not produced power since April 2019, its sole customer, NV Energy, subsequently terminated its contract. Bloomberg reported that NV Energy was not allowed to sever its agreement with the plant until after the DoE took over the shuttered plant in August 2019.

Since the initial failure of the Crescent Dunes project, SolarReserve took down its website and is believed to have permanently ceased operations. Upon the developer's silence as the involved parties sought legal recourse, the plant's exact status was publicly unknown for some time and was left to conjecture.

While proceeding through its subsequent bankruptcy proceedings, Tonopah Solar Energy stated that it had hopes for a restart of the Crescent Dunes plant by the end of 2020. According to court documents, Tonopah is owned by SolarReserve, Cobra Energy Investment LLC, a division of Spanish construction company ACS Group and Banco Santander, S.A. On September 11, 2020, the bankruptcy court approved Tonopah Solar Energy's disclosure statement. On December 3, 2020, the Chapter 11 bankruptcy reorganization plan was confirmed by the court. As one result of this plan's confirmation, Cobra now has operational control of the plant. In July 2021, the project restarted production for NV Energy.On January 21, 2026, Tonopah Solar Energy filed for Chapter 11 bankruptcy for the second time with plans to sell its assets, including the Crescent Dunes solar energy project. See history below.

== History ==
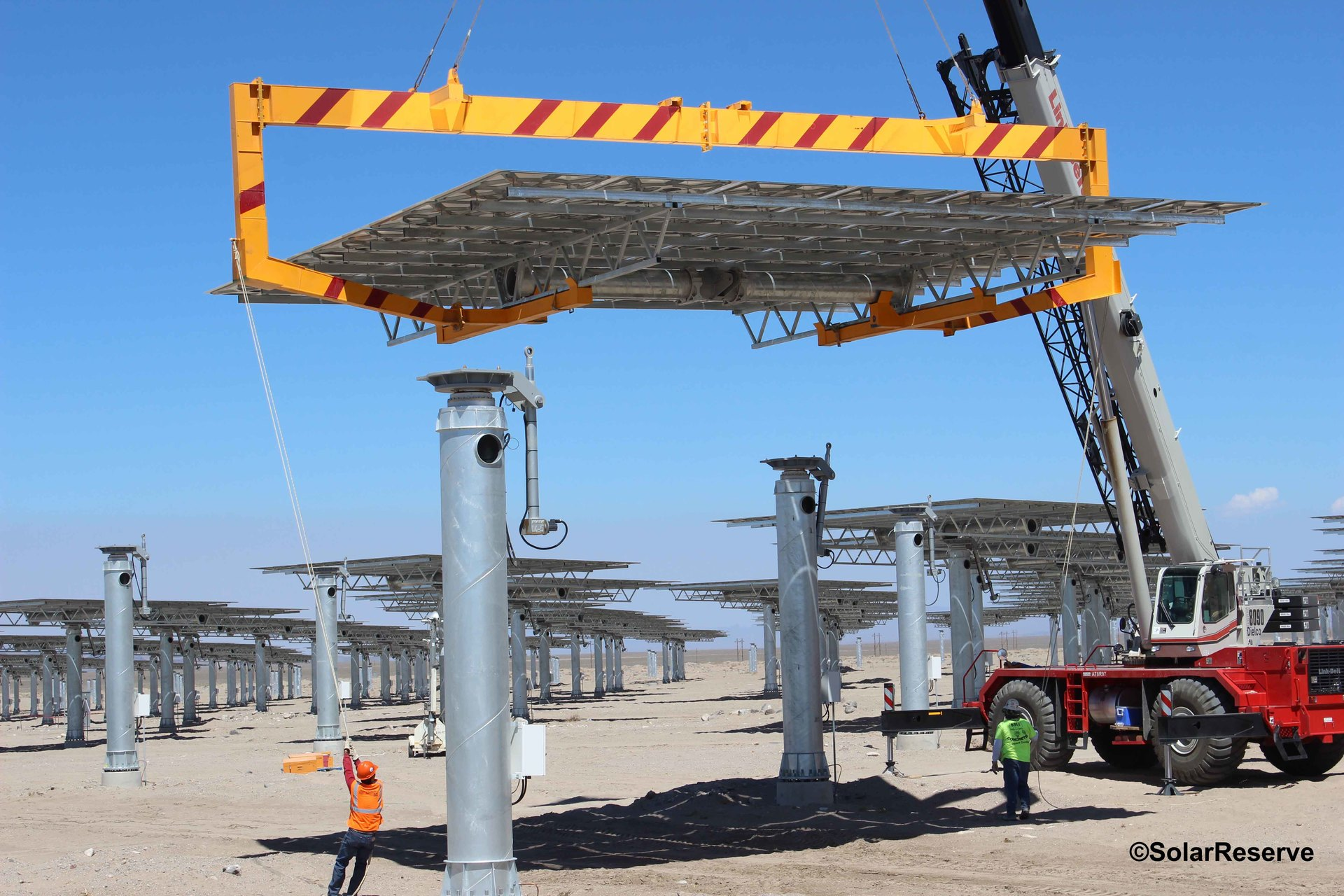
Workers installing heliostats at Crescent Dunes

In late September 2011 Tonopah Solar Energy received a $737 million loan guarantee from the United States Department of Energy (DOE) and the right to build on public land. The capital stack included $170,000,000 in EB-5 investment through SolarReserve/ACS Cobra partner CMB Regional Centers. Under a power purchase agreement between SolarReserve and NV Energy, all power generated by the Crescent Dunes project in the next 25 years would have been sold to NV Energy for $0.135 per kilowatt-hour.

Ground was broken on the project in September 2011. Construction terminated at the end of 2013, followed by several months of testing the plant systems. The project entered commissioning phase in February 2014 following completion of construction. It began operation in September 2015, but went off-line in October 2016 due to a leak in a molten salt tank. The owners warned the EPC about flaws in the salt tank foundations (and other matters) with formal comments lodged on the record in March 2012 progress meeting with DOE and its engineer present (the lender did not voice any objection). It returned to operation in July 2017.

The plant having last produced power in April 2019, NV Energy—the project's sole customer—terminated its contract in October 2019 on the basis of the project having "failed to produce." Alleging a takeover of Tonopah Solar Energy by the DOE, SolarReserve then raised the possibility of the project filing for bankruptcy, which subsequently happened. SolarReserve also filed a lawsuit, claiming that the Department of Energy was looking to appoint two new members to Tonopah Solar Energy's board of managers, giving the appearance of the Energy Department in complete control of Tonopah directors which comprise the entirety of the Tonopah Board of Managers. An interim outcome in this regard was that SolarReserve took down its website and was believed to have ceased operations permanently.

Tonopah Solar Energy filed for bankruptcy on July 30, 2020. Pending the approval of the bankruptcy court, a $200 million settlement with the remaining debtors — Tonopah Solar Energy LLC and ACS Cobra — for the return of taxpayer dollars was also announced at the end of July 2020. The amount is less than half of what taxpayers are owed on the outstanding $425 million of public debt. Under the settlement agreement and as a function of subsequent repairs, restoration of the plant to power production and acquisition of new long-term customers, ACS Cobra is liable for an additional $100 million in otherwise suspended debt.

On January 21, 2026, Tonopah Solar Energy filed for Chapter 11 bankruptcy for the second time with plans to sell its assets, including the Crescent Dunes solar energy project. The company claimed it still owes nearly $173 million in unpaid debt to Crescent Dunes Finance, Inc.

== Technology ==
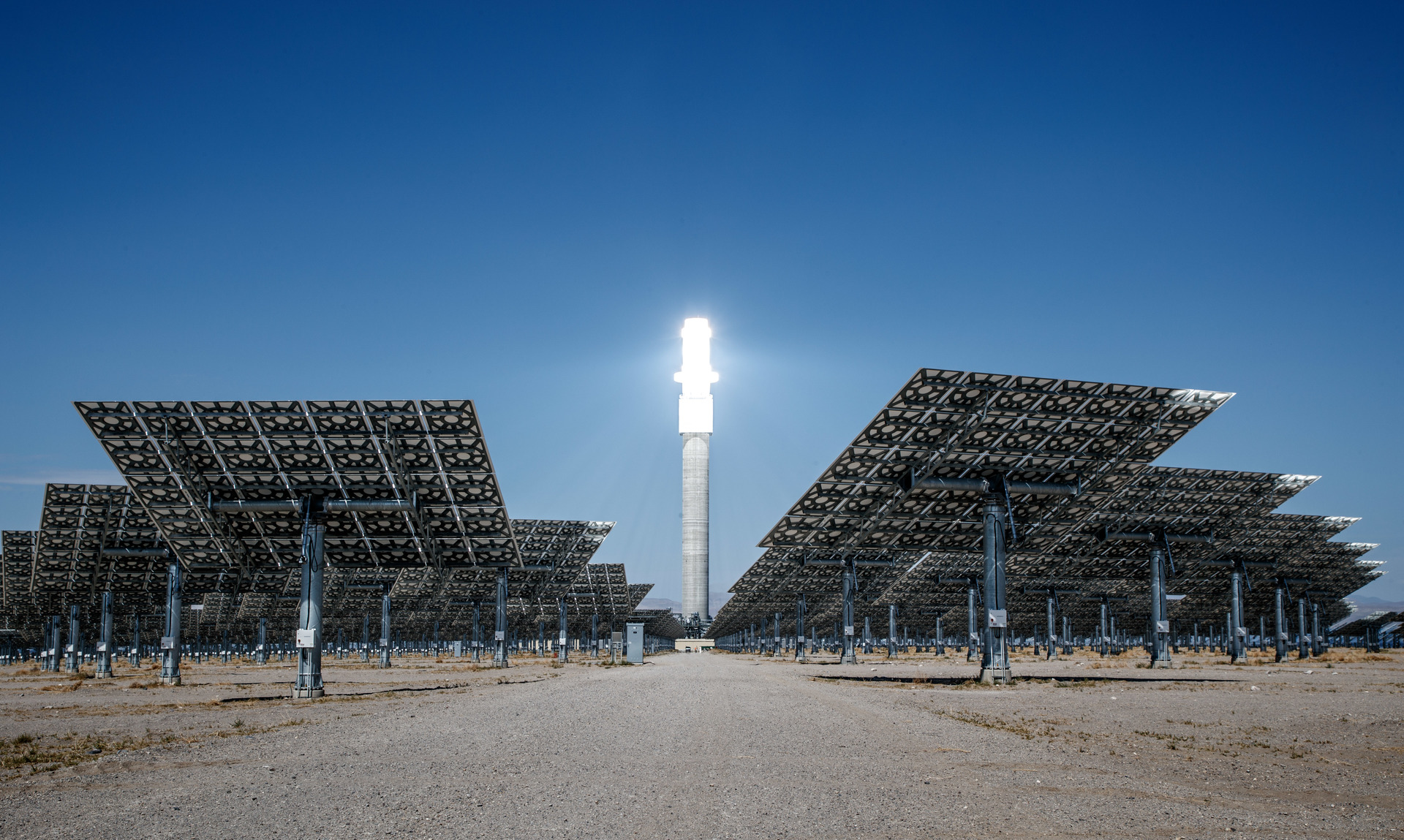
Sunlight heating molten salt in the central tower

The project's EPC Contractor was ACS Cobra, which carried out the engineering design, procured the equipment and materials necessary, and then constructed and delivered the facility to Tonopah Solar Energy. The project includes 10,347 heliostats that collect and focus the sun's thermal energy to heat molten salt flowing through an approximately 656-foot (200 m) tall solar power tower. Each heliostat is made up of 35 6×6 ft (1.8x1.8 meter) mirror facets, yielding a heliostat overall usable area of 1,245 square feet (115.7 m^{2}). Total solar field aperture adds up to 12,882,015 square feet (1,196,778 m^{2}). The molten salt circulates from the tower to a storage tank, where it is then used to produce steam and generate electricity.

Excess thermal energy is stored in the molten salt and could be used to generate power for up to ten hours, including during the evening hours and when direct sunlight is not available. The storage technology thus eliminated the need for any backup fossil fuels, such as natural gas. Melting about 70,000,000 pounds (32,000,000 kg) of salt took two months. Once melted, the salt stays melted for the life of the plant and is cycled through the receiver for reheating.

=== The thermal storage high-temperature salt tank buckling failure ===
Crescent Dunes was the first large (110 MW) tower CSP with thermal storage. While storage tanks of trough CSP operate at 400 °C (752 °F), Crescent Dunes operated the storage tank at almost 600 °C (1,112 °F), while keeping 280 °C (536 °F) as base (cold) temperature. Higher temperature differences result in a greater expansion of the tank floor, generating greater compressive forces around the floor plate. At very large diameters, as with the big tank of Crescent Dunes, that resulted in a high probability of failure under cycling loading.

== Production ==
Crescent Dunes began operation in September 2015, but went offline in October 2016 due to a leak in a molten salt tank. It returned to operation in July 2017. While its average monthly production was expected to exceed 40,000 MWh, as of May 2019 it never reached that value and only exceeded half of it during 9 months.

Generation (MW·h) of Crescent Dunes Solar Energy
Year	Jan	Feb	Mar	Apr	May	Jun	Jul	Aug	Sep	Oct	Nov	Dec	Total
2015										1,703	1,831	0	3,534
2016	1,508	9,121	7,099	2,158	11,485	6,216	25,560	28,267	30,514	5,410	0	0	127,338
2017	0	0	0	0	0	0	9,420	9,192	13,666	9,263	488	0	42,029
2018	795	5,145	5,907	13,801	10,653	33,387	23,749	33,169	31,632	21,253	8,130	8,189	195,810
2019	12,889	14,431	20,041	2,807	Production suspended								50,168
2020	Production suspended												0
2021	Production suspended						3,974	15,445	20,796	11,929	17,489	5,088	74,721
2022	14,635	12,238	0	0	0	0	0	8,852	22,166	24,710	10,590	7,475	100,666
2023	8,437	2,086	0	0	0	0	6,649	14,563	13,784	18,060	10,590	6,067	80,236
2024	4,556	4,122	6,448	13,516	20,968	26,227	18,093	19,889	18,790	9,549	5,607	6,637	154,402
2025	0	0	0	0	1,393	7,323	18,154	16,787	3,639	0	4,615	7,086	58,997
2026	7,086	5,981	10,802	8,390	-	-	-	-	-	-	-	-	-

The commissioning of a new thermal plant requires up to four years to achieve 100% operating level, from the first grid connection to full production. As an example the Edwardsport production data, whose progression, skipping first partial year, is a 40% output the first full year, 57% the second full year, the next year the progression was stopped by a problem in October, but resumes with a 73% the fourth and next year. At Crescent Dunes, a similar progression was expected, but the failure of the storage tanks in 2016 froze the commissioning. Following that, first full production year was delayed to 2018, starting with a 40% (200 over 500) output.

=== Shutdown ===
The first three months of 2019 (January, February and March) showed good progression, topping all previous monthly data [?? not consistent with Production], but in April the plant was shut down because the project's sole buyer, NV Energy, terminated the Power Purchase Agreement for failure to produce the contracted power production. The power generated also cost NV Energy about $135 per megawatt-hour, compared with less than $30 per MWh available from a new Nevada photovoltaic solar farm. However, the Tonopah solar project power is dispatchable while photovoltaic power is intermittent. Levelized cost comparisons must include the capacity payments for generating capacity available to supply power during peak hours. By doing so, low-to-high hourly wholesale electricity prices have been shown to vary by up to four orders of magnitude.

In July 2021, the project restarted production.

== Gallery ==
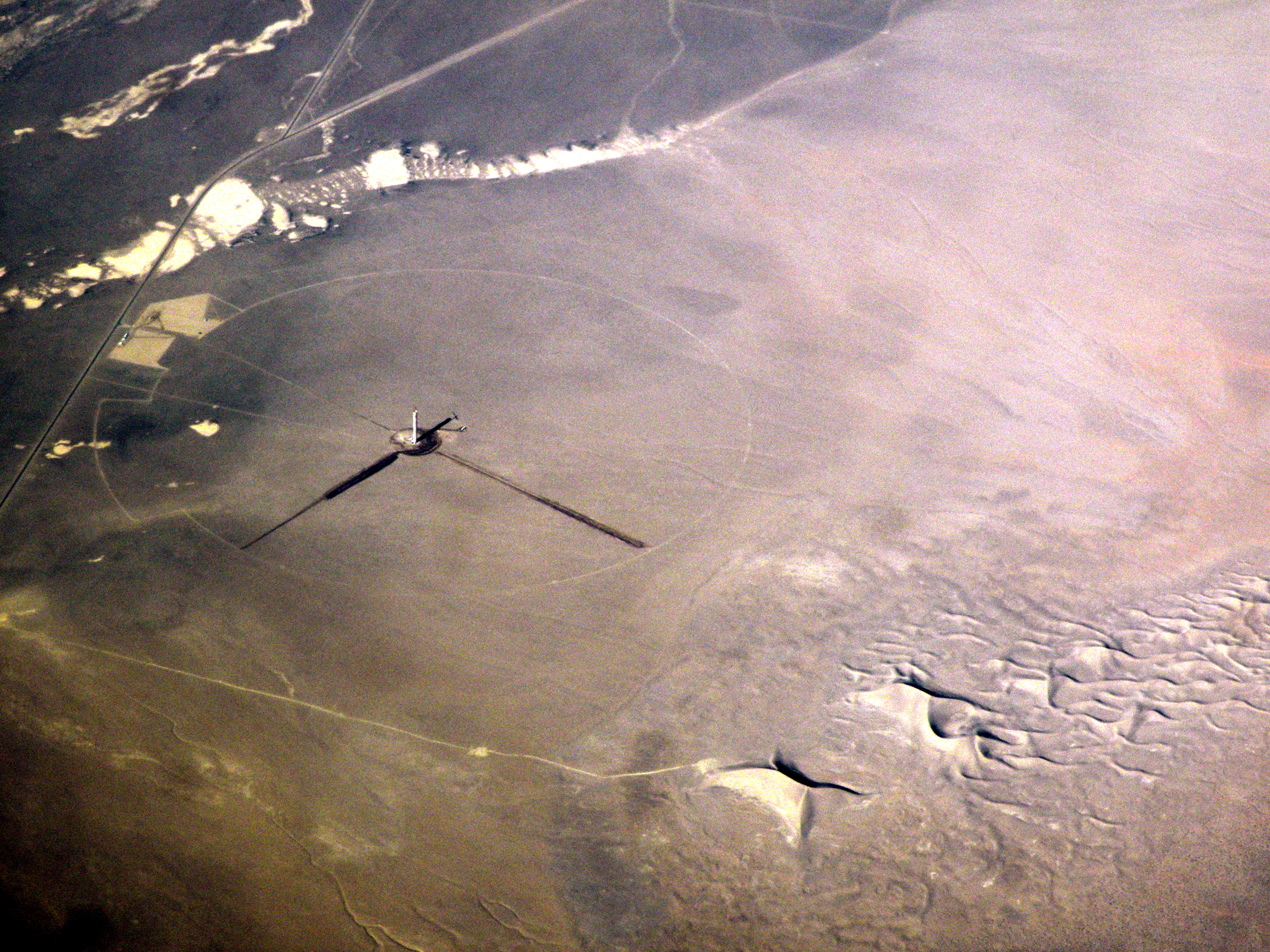
2012 January – The solar tower under construction as seen from a commercial airliner. The eponymous Crescent Dunes are at lower right.

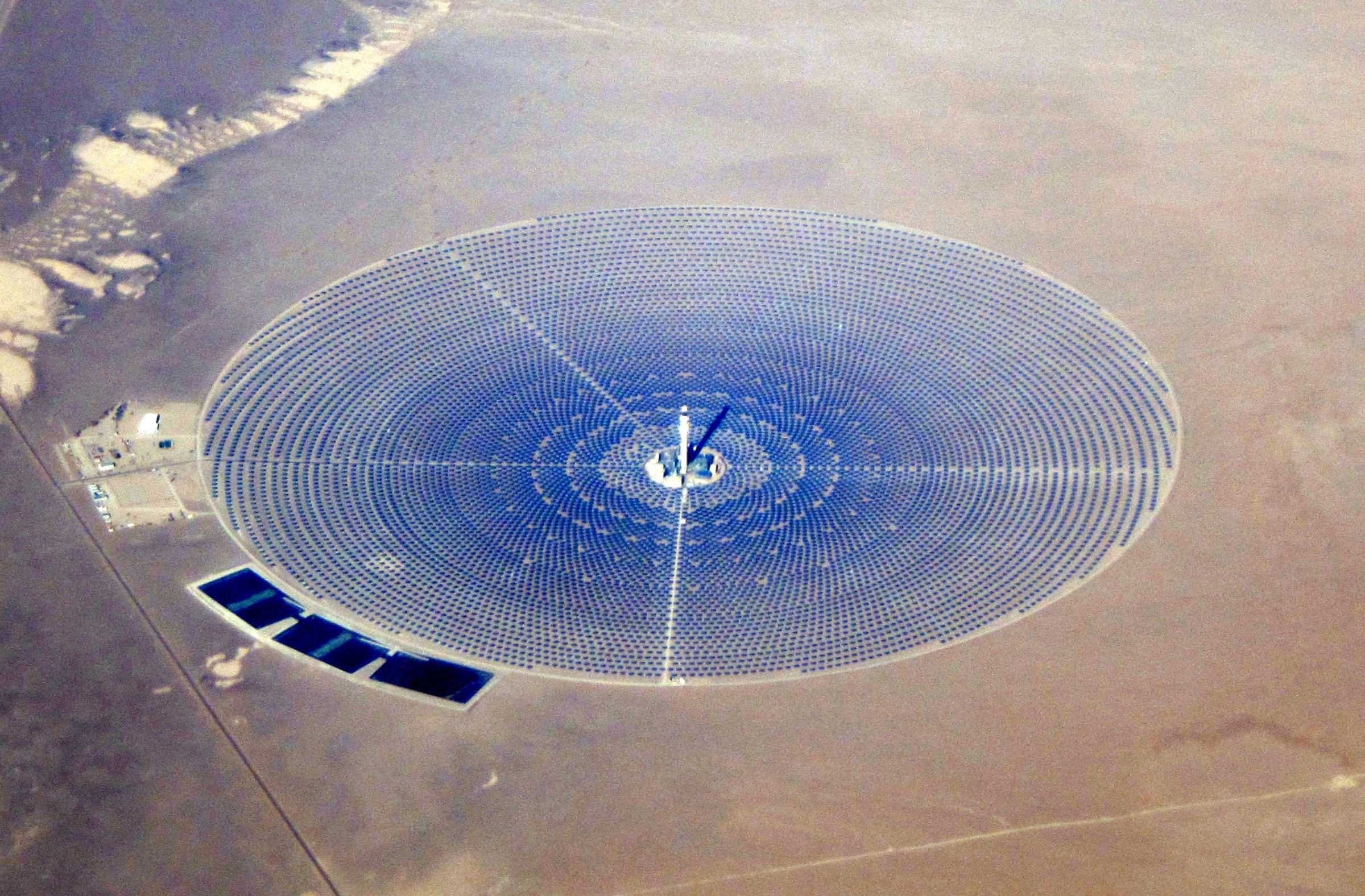
2014 December – Completed site as seen from a commercial airliner.

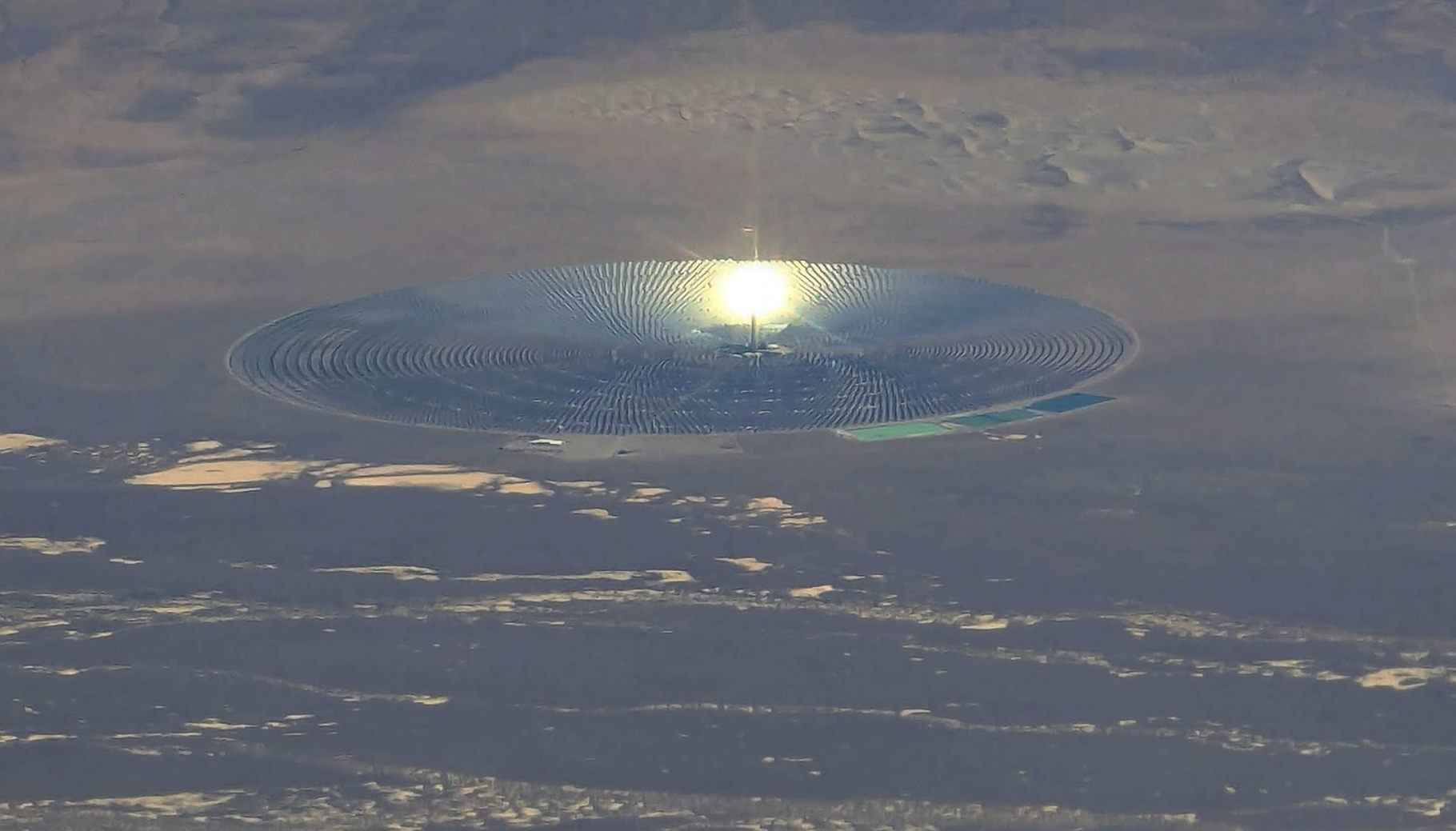
2024 August - Crescent Dunes Solar Energy Project as seen from commercial airliner

== See also ==
- List of solar thermal power stations
- Renewable energy in the United States
- Solar thermal energy
