= Lesedi Solar Park =

Photovoltaic power plant in South Africa

- 28°18'36"S 23°21'47"E
- Country: South Africa
- Location: Postmasburg, Northern Cape Province
- Coordinates: 28°18′36″S 23°21′47″E
- Status: Operational

Solar farm
- Type: Flat-panel PV

Power generation
- Units operational: 277,632
- Nameplate capacity: 75 MW_{p}, 64 MW_{AC}

The Lesedi Solar Park is a 75-megawatt (MW) solar photovoltaic power plant in Groenwater, Northern Cape, South Africa. The solar park with 277,632 PV solar panels which went fully on line in May 2014, and will supply electricity for 65,000 homes, while reducing the use of pollution-generating fossil fuels.
