= STACEE =

Gamma ray detector

- Location: New Mexico
- Coordinates: 34.9623°N 106.5097°W
- Built: 2001-10–2007-06
- Location within the United States

The Solar Tower Atmospheric Cherenkov Effect Experiment (STACEE), is a gamma ray detector located near Albuquerque, New Mexico. Observations with STACEE began in October 2001 (24 years ago) and concluded in June 2007 (19 years ago). Gamma rays were observed from objects such as the Crab Nebula, a supernova remnant, and Markarian 421, a blazar. STACEE uses the heliostats and space on the receiver tower of the National Solar Thermal Test Facility (NSTTF) operated by the Sandia National Laboratories on the grounds of the Kirtland Air Force Base. In the daytime, the facility is used for solar energy research. During the night STACEE uses the heliostats to reflect the brief flashes of Čerenkov radiation caused by gamma rays hitting the upper atmosphere to photodetectors mounted in the tower. STACEE is a nonimaging telescope, meaning that it detects the light from a portion of the sky, but does not resolve the light into an image.

The detector is operated in consortium with several universities, including McGill University, Case Western Reserve University, the University of California, Los Angeles (UCLA), the University of California, Santa Cruz, Columbia University, and the University of Alberta.
