= World's Toughest Fixes =

- Presented by: Sean Riley
- Country of origin: United States
- No. of seasons: 4

Production
- Running time: 60 including commercials

Original release
- Network: National Geographic Channel
- Release: September 28, 2008 – 2010

World's Toughest Fixes is an American reality television series that premiered on the National Geographic Channel on September 28, 2008. It featured Sean Riley participating in various "tough fixes"; repairs and renovations done on equipment that is very large or dangerous. Riley is an expert in heavy duty rigging and load bearing, and works with other specialized engineers to tackle these uniquely difficult jobs. A first season aired 8 episodes beginning on September 26, 2008. A second season aired 8 episodes beginning on June 4, 2009. A third season of 7 episodes aired beginning May 6, 2010. A fourth season aired beginning September 30, 2010. The first season DVD contains 10 episodes, 2 of which aired in season 2. The second season DVD contains 11 episodes, 5 of which aired in season 3.

== Season 1 episodes ==
- "Nuclear Turbine" - Susquehanna Steam Electric Station
- "Boeing 767" - An Air Seychelles Boeing 767-300ER has a pressure dome replaced at Charles de Gaulle Airport.
- "High Voltage Power Lines"
- "Thirty-Eight Ton Engine" - DCV Balder thruster
- "Giant Telescope" - Very Large Telescope
- "2000-Foot Tower" - KDLT Tower, a TV antenna in South Dakota
- "Cruise Ship Engine" - Fixing Radiance of the Seas power generator in Grand Bahama Island
- "Interstate Bridge" - Replacing a bridge in Utah (DVD "Bridge Quick Fix")

== Season 2 episodes ==
- "Satellite Launch" - Guiana Space Centre
- "Alaska Oil Pipeline" (DVD S1)
- "Giant Wind Turbine" - Rhode Island
- "50-Ton Rudder" - Curaçao
- "Mississippi River Barge" (DVD S1)
- "Solar Power Plant" - construction of the eSolar Sierra SunTower 5 MW solar energy plant in Lancaster, CA
- "Columbia River Dam"
- "Atom Smasher" - Large Hadron Collider

== Season 3 episodes ==
- "Rocky Mountain Rigging" (DVD S2) - Ski lift in Cody, Wyoming
- "Extreme Bridges" - UK/London (Tower Bridge) and Scotland (Forth bridges)
- "Fixing Vegas" (DVD S2)
- "Extreme Heights" (DVD S2)
- "Cruise Ship Overhaul" (DVD S2)
- "Philly Mega Transit" - SEPTA operations and repair
- "San Francisco Bridge" (DVD S2) - about the Eastern span replacement of the San Francisco – Oakland Bay Bridge

== Season 4 episodes ==
- "Ultimate Water Ride" - Water coaster at Holiday World & Splashin' Safari
- "Sky High Texas Tower" - Remove an old analog TV antenna in San Antonio, Texas
- "Salt Lake City Sky Bridge" - The City Creek Center Sky Bridge spanning Main Street in downtown Salt Lake City.
- "Alaskan Salvage" - Sea cowboys removes an old rusty fishing ship (Ocean Clipper) at Saint Paul Island (Alaska)
- "Deep Space Antenna" - Overhauling of the bearings of the DSS 14 Antenna in Goldstone Deep Space Communications Complex

== See also ==
- Megastructures (TV series)
