= Particle receiver =

Solar tower

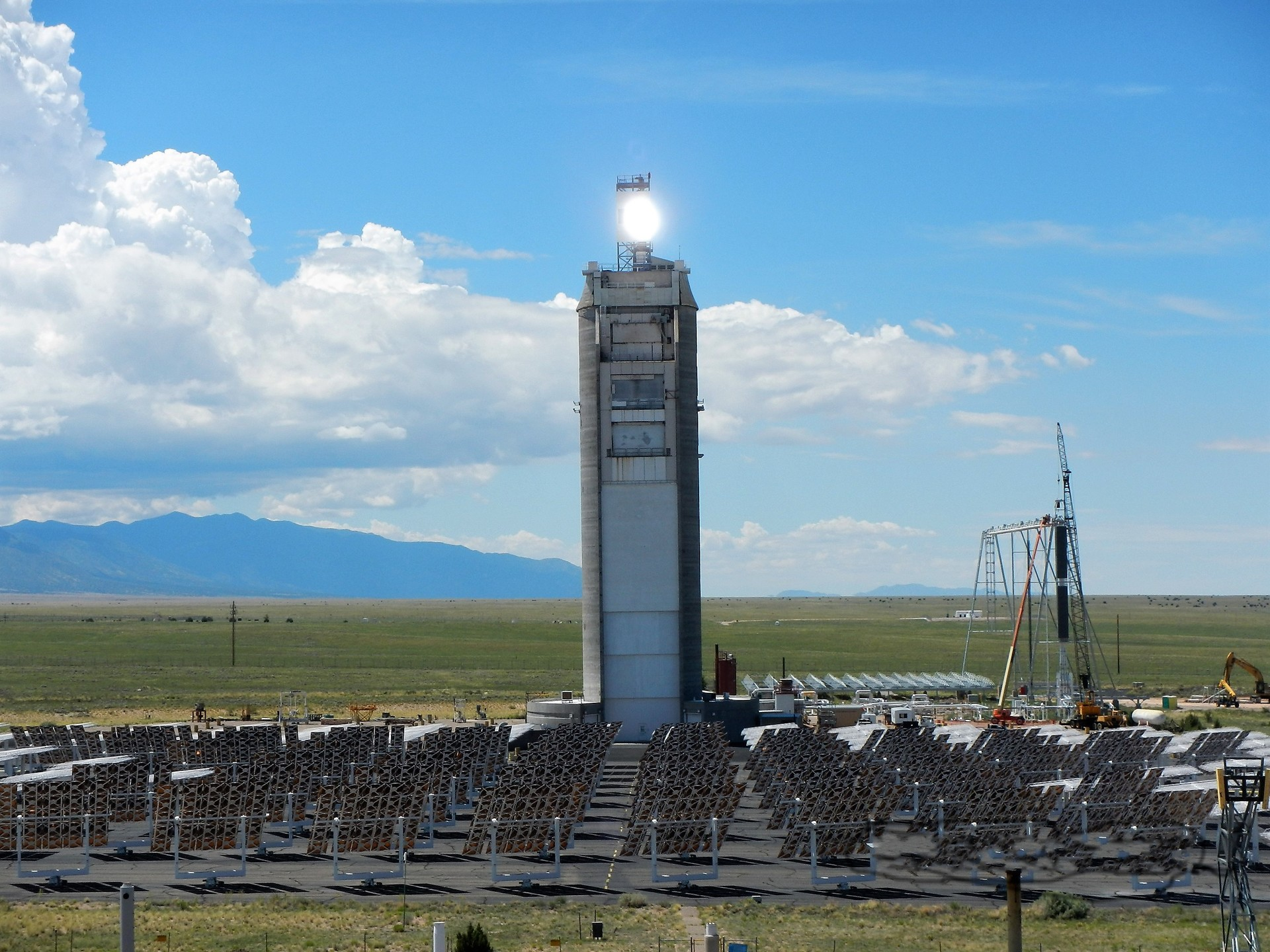
Solar tower employing particle receiver at National Solar Thermal Test Facility

A particle receiver is an object placed on the top of a solar tower on which surface solar energy is concentrated by means of a solar field composed of large number of mirrors, called heliostats. The goal is to transform solar energy into thermal energy that can be used in a heat process, thermochemical process, or in a heat engine to produce electricity in a solar tower power plant. To accomplish this, it is necessary to introduce certain material, called heat transfer medium, to the receiver that is then heated up, either directly or indirectly, by the concentrated solar energy before leaving the receiver at a higher temperature. Unlike receivers used in conventional concentrated solar power (CSP), power plants which employ molten salts as a heat transfer medium that is heated indirectly by flowing through the metal tubes that are exposed to the concentrated solar energy, particle receivers adopt solid particles which then can be heated either directly or indirectly, depending on the technology considered.

One of the main advantages of adopting particles as a heat transfer medium is the possibility of direct heating, where particles are exposed directly to the incoming solar radiation, thus avoiding issues related to non-uniform heating of receiver tubes. Also, the possibility to reach temperatures above 1000 °C allows for the adoption of Brayton cycle with supercritical CO_{2} as the working fluid which can achieve higher thermal efficiency compared to the steam Rankine cycle which is used in the conventional CSP power plants that have a maximum temperature limit of 565 °C due to issues related with the thermal stability of the molten salts.

== Directly heated particle receiver ==
=== Free-falling receiver ===
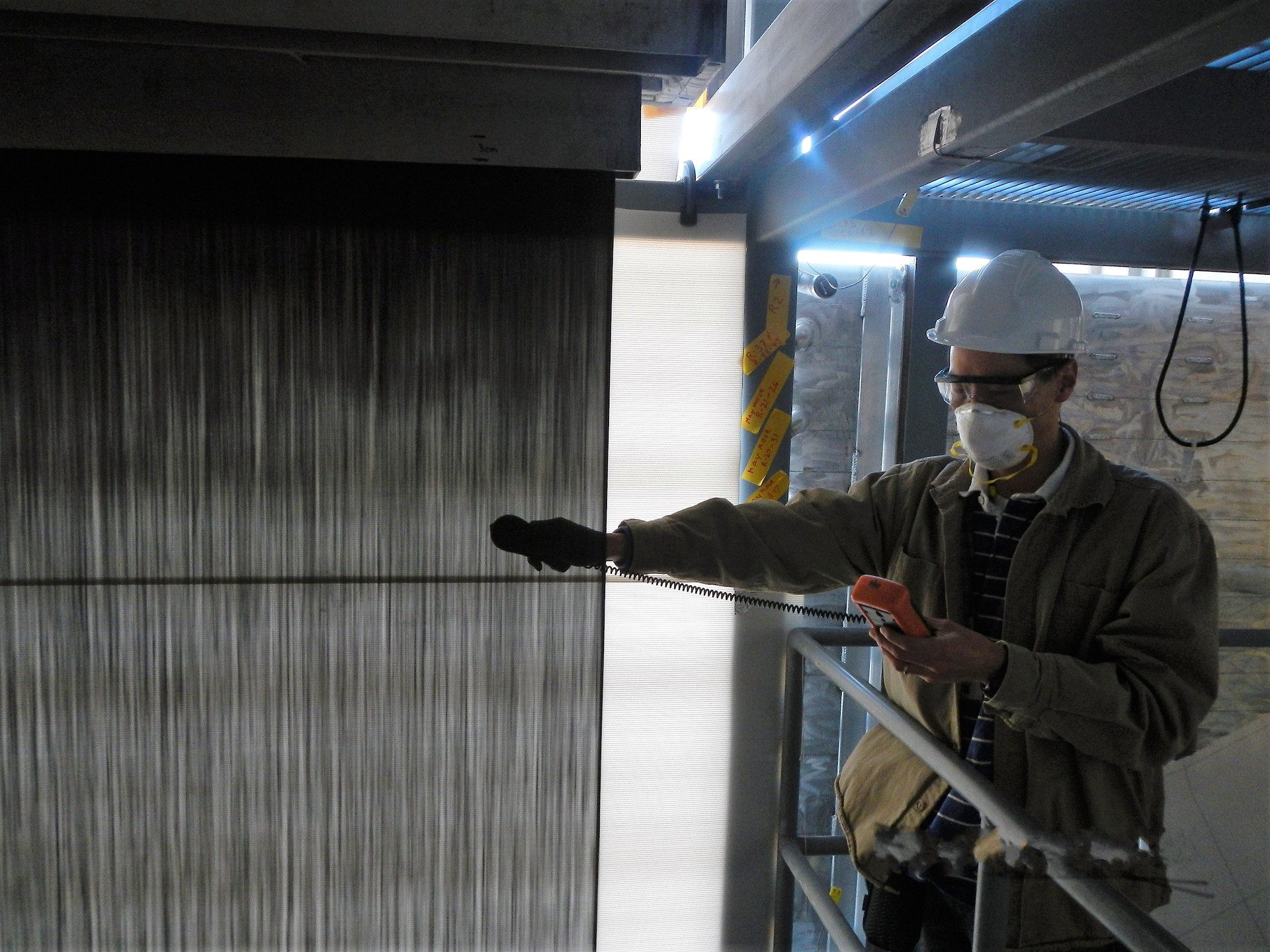
Measurements of light transmittance of the falling particle curtain in December 2014 at the National Solar Thermal Test Facility

This technology is based on a free-falling particle curtain inside the receiver cavity that absorbs concentrated solar radiation. The idea of using falling solid particles in a concentrated solar power facility to supply high-temperature heat to the power cycle or chemical process was introduced in a pioneering work carried out by Martin and Vitko during the beginning of the 1980s at Sandia National Laboratories. However, the first step towards demonstrating the concept at the larger scale was carried out in 2009 at National Solar Thermal Test Facility in Albuquerque, New Mexico, where prototype particle receiver was placed atop the 61-meter-tall (200 ft) solar tower with a solar field able to provide 5 MW_{th}. These tests resulted in receiver thermal efficiency of around 50% and maximum temperature increase of the particles of around 250 °C. More comprehensive tests were carried out in 2015 using a 1 MW_{th} receiver having a 1 by 1 meter aperture through which concentrated sun radiation enters the cavity. Receiver thermal efficiency ranged from 50% to 80%, and the temperature of the particles at the bottom of the receiver reached 700 °C in some cases.

Limit on the maximum temperature of molten salts used in the conventional solar tower power plants led to a workshop organized by United States Department of Energy (DOE) in August 2016 which identified three possible pathways for the next generation CSP power plants based on the following heat transfer carriers: molten salts, solid particles, and gaseous fluids. This further led to the Generation 3 Concentrating Solar Power Systems funding program that started on May 15 of 2018 when DOE announced its intention to provide $72 million to the project where three teams are going to compete in building a system integrated with a thermal energy storage that is able to efficiently capture solar energy and provide it to the working fluid of the power cycle at temperatures above 700 °C. On March 25, 2021 DOE announced that the pathway adopting falling solid particles is the most promising one for achieving 2030 cost targets of 0.05$/kWh and awarded Sandia National Laboratories with $25 million for building, testing, and operating pilot plant adopting particle receiver at National Solar Thermal Test Facility which is expected to be completed by the end of 2024.

=== Obstructed-flow receiver ===
Idea of obstructing the flow of particles while retaining the concept of direct heating is motivated by the fact that by slowing down the flow of particles, it is possible to increase thermal efficiency of the receiver by increasing the opacity of the particle curtain and reduce their loss through the aperture. Early tests of this concept were carried out at Sandia during the 1980s, but no analytical nor experimental studies were published until the 2010s. Experiments carried out at Sandia in 2015 using chevron-shaped porous structures managed to improve heating of the particles and reduce their loss through the receiver aperture. However, there were problems related to the direct exposure of the stainless steel 316, used for constructing these porous structures, to concentrated solar radiation, and its wear due to particle flow over it. Another design proposes to use a spiral ramp over which particles flow due to the combined effect of the gravitational force and mechanically induced vibrations. Tests showed that it is possible to reach particle temperature of 650 °C and thermal efficiency of around 60%. However, this design requires beam-down optics that would result in additional optical losses, and significant particle flow could be difficult to obtain using the proposed design.

=== Centrifugal receiver ===
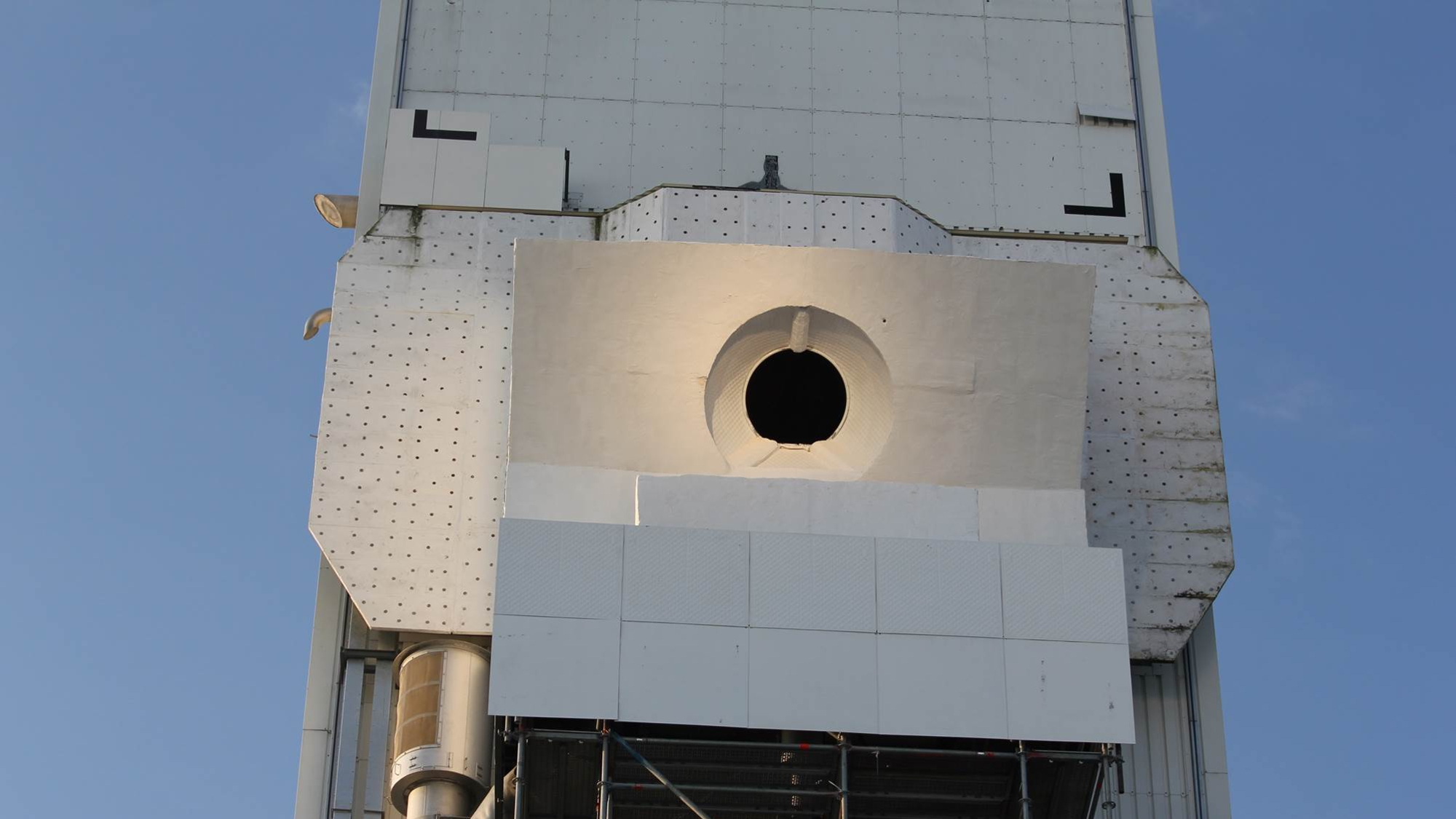
Centrifugal receiver installed at Jülich Solar Tower by DLR

This concept is based on a rotating cylindrical cavity that can be inclined with respect to the horizontal direction. Due to rotation of the cavity, particles form thin but opaque layer over the cavity inner surface. These particles are then heated by concentrated solar radiation while they descend slowly along the axial direction of the cavity due to effect of the gravitational force. Concept was proposed initially by Flamant in the late 1970s and early 1980s but there were no further developments until DLR started working on this concept in the early 2010s when they started with laboratory scale prototype testing. Proof-of-Concept 15 kW_{th} centrifugal receiver was designed, built, and tested at the DLR facility in Cologne and the results showed that it is possible to reach outlet particle temperatures of over 900 °C. However, due to problems in measuring particle mass flow rate it was not possible to determine receiver thermal efficiency. Further experimental campaigns obtained thermal efficiency of 75% for particle outlet temperature equal to 900 °C with an incident heat flux of 670 kW/m^{2}. As of 2018 this receiver concept is installed at Jülich Solar Tower test facility.

=== Fluidized receiver ===
This receiver can operate on two possible working principles. First one was proposed by Flamant at the same time when he proposed the centrifugal receiver, and it is based on a transparent silica wall through which concentrated solar energy passes and heats solid particles that are suspended by means of compressed air. Goal was to heat the suspended particles in order to perform decarbonation of CaCO_{3} and therefore the conversion of solar energy to the thermochemical one. Tests carried out showed that it is possible to reach particle temperatures above 1200 °C. Second working principle was proposed by Hunt during the late 1970s and it is based on the injection of very small particles inside the stream of compressed air that absorb concentrated solar energy, and due to their large surface area they immediately transfer that heat to the surrounding air. Heating of the mixture is performed until the particles vaporize and then the air is sent to the Brayton cycle to produce electric energy.

== Indirectly heated particle receiver ==
=== Gravity-driven particle flow through enclosures ===
This receiver concept is composed of an enclosure with horizontal tubes with their external side inside of the enclosure and having their internal side irradiated with concentrated solar energy. The idea is that particles are going to flow down inside the enclosure due to the gravitational force and around the staggered array of tubes while being heated. Tests showed that heat transfer between particles and tubes was reduced in the areas where particles lost contact with the tubes, however no data regarding the temperatures and thermal efficiencies were reported. Advantages of this concept include absence of particle loss due to the presence of the enclosure, however issues related to the thermal stresses on the enclosure may arise due to indirect heating of the particles.

=== Fluidized particle flow through tubes ===
This concept is similar to that of the directly heated fluidized receiver, only difference is that now tubes are not transparent and particles are heated indirectly by the metal tubes. Flamant proposed and demonstrated this concept and obtained suspension temperatures up to 750 °C, however he did not report thermal efficiencies. Possible problems related to this idea include electric energy consumption for the fluidization of particles in the receiver and possible hotspots and high surface temperatures that can increase radiation losses to the environment.

== Particle selection ==
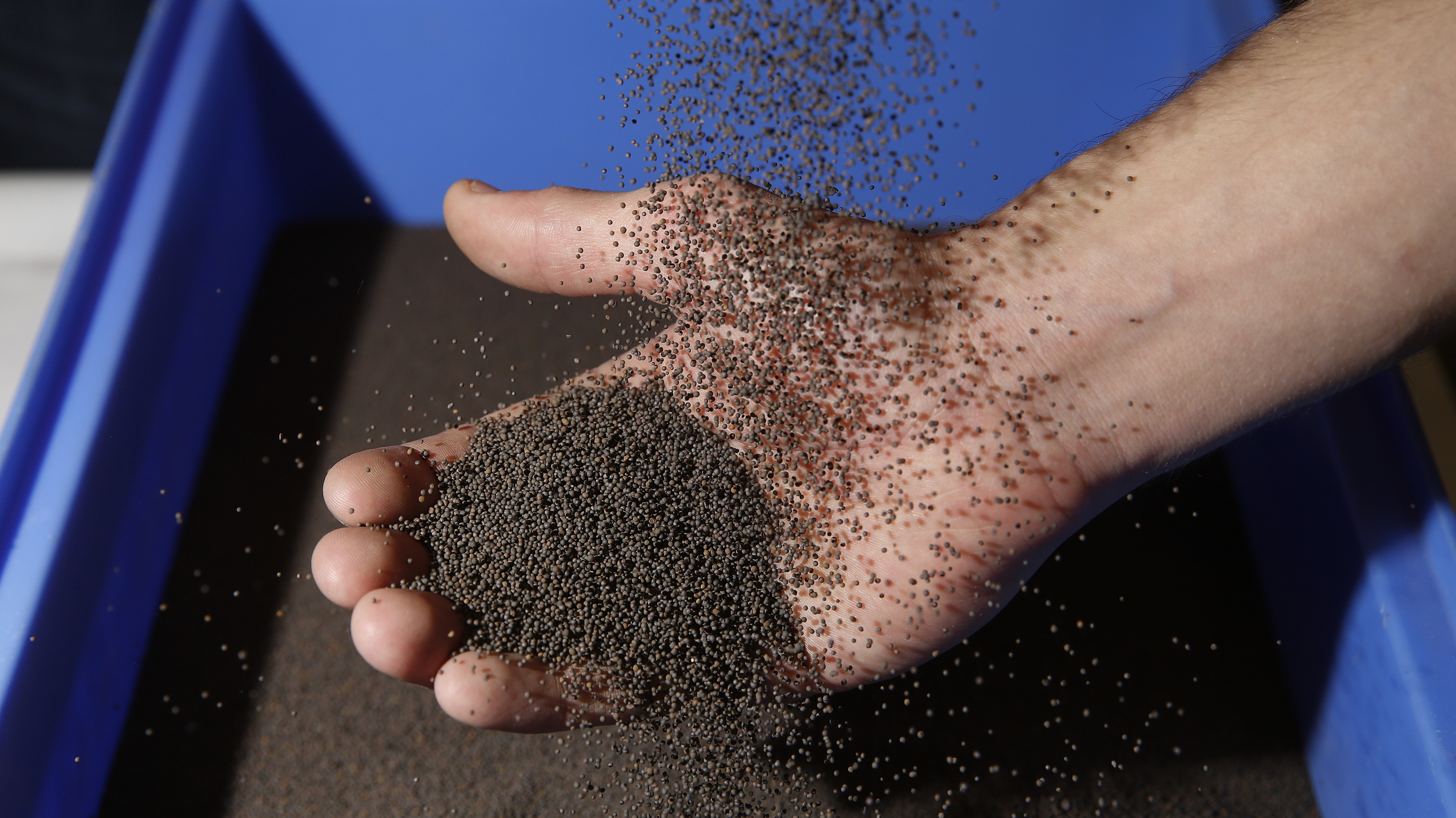
Bauxite particles

Important factor in evaluating thermal performance of the particle receiver and economic viability of the whole plant is the type of particles used. Desired properties include low cost, high thermal stability, and in case of directly heated receivers, optical properties. Natural materials are considered due to their low price, however attention should also be paid to the composite materials that can be synthesized to enhance desired properties even though they have a higher price. As in directly heated receivers solid particles serve as the solar absorbers, their optical properties become crucial in evaluating receiver performances. It has been shown that increasing solar absorptivity is more important than reducing thermal emissivity, meaning that particles with high emissivity can still be considered as a good candidate if they have high absorptivity, but particles having low absorptivity cannot be considered as a good candidate even if they have low emissivity. Sintered bauxite particles have high solar absorptivity, and it has been shown that despite certain degradation due to prolonged heating, they are able to keep it above 90%. It has also been shown that they are the most durable ones among the other candidate particles. Therefore it has been concluded that they are the best candidate for the use in directly heated particle receivers, and in particular intermediate-density casting media "Accucast" has been deployed at Sandia's National Solar Thermal Test Facility.

== See also ==
- Concentrated solar power
- Solar power tower
- Solar thermal collector
- Solar thermal energy
