= Rio Mesa Solar Electric Generating Facility =

Canceled power station in California

- Country: United States
- Location: near Blythe, Riverside Co.
- Coordinates: 33°27′30″N 114°46′30″W
- Status: Proposed
- Construction began: planned for 2013; cancelled
- Commission date: planned for 2016; cancelled
- Construction cost: $2 billion

Solar farm
- Type: CSP
- CSP technology: Solar power tower
- Site area: 4,070 acres (16.5 km^{2})

Power generation
- Nameplate capacity: 500 MW

The Rio Mesa Solar Electric Generating Facility was a proposed 500 megawatts (670,000 hp) solar thermal power project in Riverside County, California. The developers for the project were subsidiaries of BrightSource Energy, Inc. The plant was expected to cost about $2 billion.

The plant was to comprise two solar power towers, each with a generating capacity of 250 megawatts (340,000 hp). About 170,000 heliostats would have reflected sunlight to the receivers mounted on top of the 750-foot (230 m) towers. The project was scaled down from 750 megawatts (1,010,000 hp) to 500 MW in May 2012, for which it has a power purchase agreement (PPA) with Southern California Edison (SCE).

In December 2011, the California Energy Commission (CEC) accepted the application for certification for the Rio Mesa SEGF. In October 2012, Rio Mesa received preliminary approval from the CEC; final approval was needed by June 2013 to fulfill its PPA. However, the discovery of a large deposit of Pleistocene fossils underlying part of the project's area delayed approval or construction. In January 2013, BrightSource suspended the Rio Mesa project; the project was formally cancelled in July 2013.
