= BrightSource Energy =

Solar power company

BrightSource Energy, Inc.
- Type: Venture backed private
- Industry: Solar thermal power
- Founded: 2004; 22 years ago
- Founder: Arnold J. Goldman
- Headquarters: Oakland, California, U.S.
- Key people: David Ramm (CEO)(Chairman)
- Website: www.brightsourceenergy.com

BrightSource Energy, Inc. is an Oakland, California based corporation that designs, builds, finances, and operates utility-scale solar power plants. Greentech Media ranked BrightSource as one of the top 10 greentech startups in the world in 2008.

== History ==
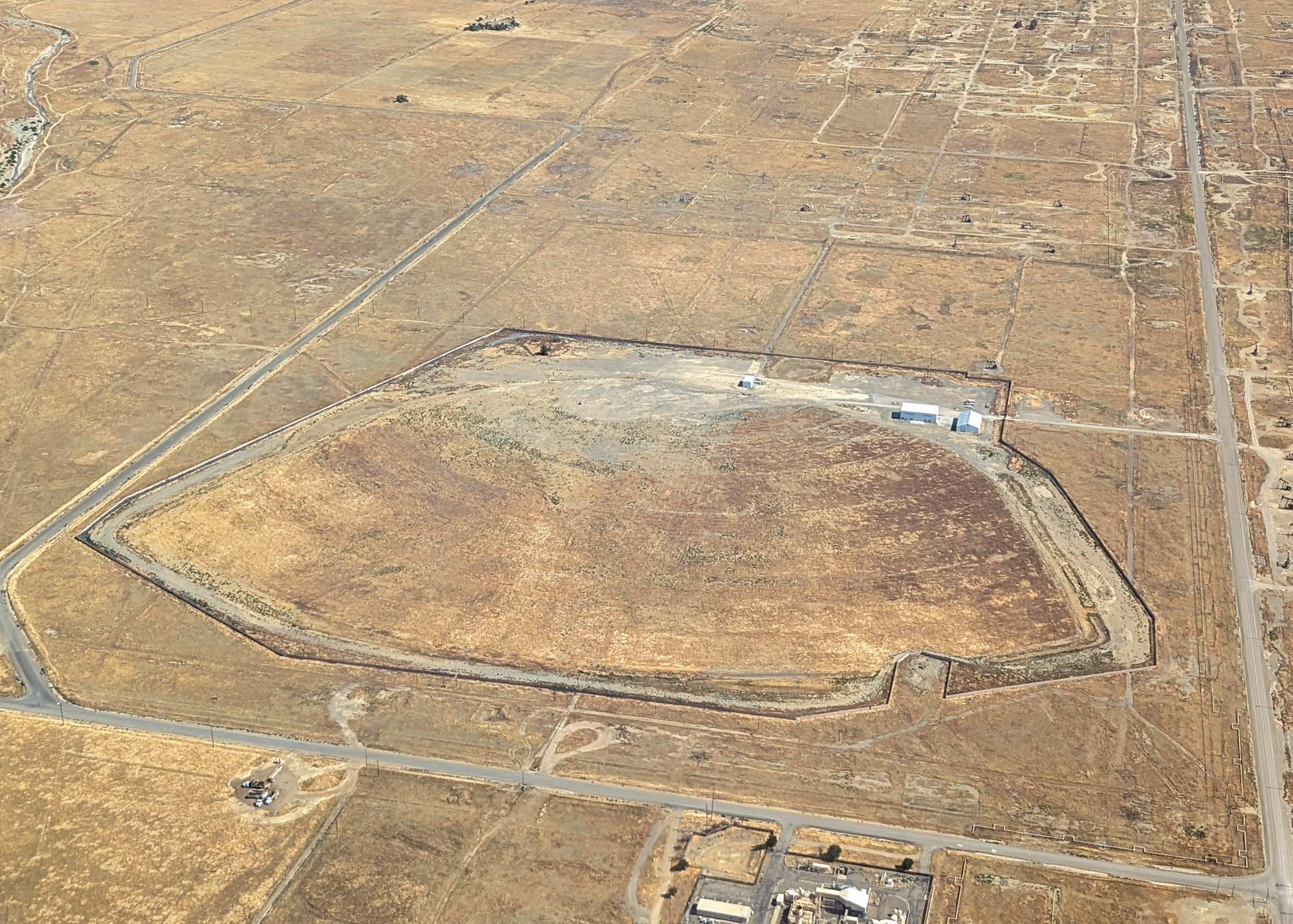
The former BrightSource Energy solar plant, Coalinga, California

BrightSource was formed with seed capital from VantagePoint Venture Partners. It secured $115 million in additional corporate funding from its Series C round of financing in May 2008, bringing the total the company has raised at that time to over $160 million. Investors include Google.org, BP Alternative Energy, Morgan Stanley, DBL Investors, Draper Fisher Jurvetson, Chevron Technology Ventures, Statoil Venture, and Black River. By May 2010, the total amount raised was $337 million.

BrightSource Industries (Israel) Ltd., formerly named Luz II Ltd., is a wholly owned subsidiary of BrightSource Energy, Inc. Based in Israel, BrightSource Industries is responsible for solar technology development, plant design and engineering.

In March 2008, BrightSource entered into a series of power purchase agreements with Pacific Gas and Electric Company (PG&E) for up to 900 MW of electricity. In February 2009, BrightSource contracted to sell power from seven solar power towers in the Mojave Desert to Southern California Edison (SCE). The plants were to have a combined capacity of 1,300 MW, producing 3.7 billion kilowatt-hours per year. The Ivanpah Solar Power Facility, BrightSource's 377 MW, 3,900-acre (16 km^{2}) plant opened on February 13, 2014. The total cost of the Ivanpah project was $2.2 billion. The largest investor in the project was NRG Energy, a power generating company based in Princeton, New Jersey, that contributed $300 million. Siemens supplied instrumentation and control systems as well as steam-turbine generators.

In 2009, BrightSource Energy announced plans to build a 960 MW (1,290,000 hp) solar thermal power plant in Coyote Springs that would be on line by 2012. In 2010, BrightSource hired Morgan Stanley and Goldman Sachs to begin preparations for a public offering in 2011. Its fourth round of equity financing in May netted $150 million, bringing total equity financing to $330 million to date.

In November 2011, Google announced that they would stop investing in CSP projects due to the rapid price decline of photovoltaics. Google spent $168 million on BrightSource. In December 2011, Google and KKR & Co. announced an agreement to invest in four California solar power PV plants with total capacity of 88 megawatts.

In December 2011, The California Energy Commission (CEC) began to review a proposed 750 MW Rio Mesa Solar Project in Riverside County, California. BrightSource Energy Inc. is the developer for this project. The project was cancelled in 2013.

In 2012, BrightSource Energy proposed to build the Hidden Hills Solar Electric Generating System Project near Charleston View, California. The project was withdrawn in 2015 due to concerns over the effects on wildlife, groundwater, cultural and historical resources in the area along with "lackluster updates" by BrightSource. In addition, then recent Inyo County planning policy changes would prevent large solar thermal plants being built in the county.

=== Shift to overseas projects ===
In September 2014, BrightSource ended its upcoming California projects, withdrawing its application for a solar thermal power plant at Palen, near Riverside. Biologists, Native American groups, and advocates for Joshua Tree National Park were concerned that the bright light and heat of the Palen project's heliostats would prove fatal for birds. The company shifted its focus to overseas projects. In November 2014, Bright Source announced a joint venture with Shanghai Electric to build "utility scale solar thermal projects," and proposed the "construction of two 135 megawatt (MW) CSP plants as part of the Qinghai Delingha Solar Thermal Power Generation Project."

In March 2016, it was confirmed that BrightSource is supplying technology to Ashalim Power Station in the Negev Desert of Israel.

In September 2016, BrightSource signed a deal to sell its Ivanpah solar farm technology to a Chinese project owned by a state-run energy company.

Arnold Goldman, the founder of BrightSource, died in 2017.

In 2020 it was reported that the main telephone number of BrightSource was directed to voicemail and that the most recent announcement on the website was from 2017.

== See also ==
- Concentrating solar power
- Solar power tower
- Solar thermal energy
- List of concentrating solar thermal power companies
- List of energy storage projects
- List of solar thermal power stations
