= Khi Solar One =

Solar power tower plant in the Northern Cape, South Africa

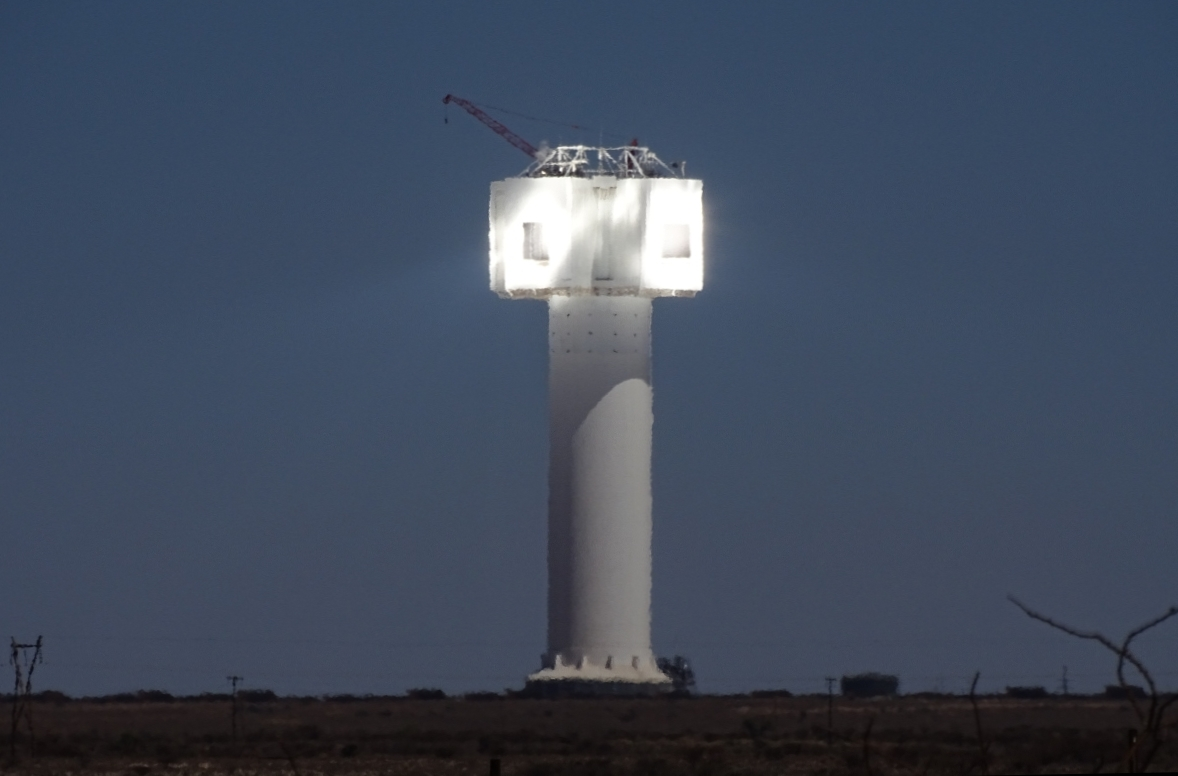
- Solar One from South
- Country: South Africa
- Location: Upington (Dawid Kruiper Local Municipality)
- Coordinates: 28°32′14″S 21°4′39″E
- Status: Operational
- Construction began: November 2012
- Commission date: February 2016
- Owner: Khi Solar One Pty. Ltd
- Operator: Abengoa

Solar farm
- Type: CSP
- CSP technology: Solar power tower
- Collectors: 4,120
- Total collector area: 57.68 hectares (143 acres)
- Site area: 140 hectares (346 acres)

Power generation
- Units operational: 1
- Nameplate capacity: 50 MW
- Capacity factor: 41% (planned)
- Annual net output: 180 GW·h (planned)
- Storage capacity: 100 MW·h_{e}

External links
- Commons: Related media on Commons

Khi Solar One (KSO) is a solar power tower solar thermal power plant, located in the Northern Cape Region of South Africa. Khi Solar One is 50 megawatts (MW), and is the first solar tower plant in Africa. It covers an area of 140 hectares (346 acres).

Abengoa claims that Khi Solar One is the first thermal solar tower plant in Africa and the first to achieve 24 hours of operation using only solar energy. This is made possible by reduced electricity demand at night, as the plant's storage system can provide full output for only two hours.

The KSO is an evolution of the PS10 and PS20 projects, operating since 2007 and 2009 respectively in Spain. KSO solar field is made of more than 4,000 heliostats, totaling up to 576,800 m^{2} (6,209,000 sq ft) of mirror surface, focusing solar energy on a boiler located on top a centralized 205-metre-high (673 ft) tower. KSO uses a superheated steam cycle that should be able to reach a maximum operating temperature of 530 °C. Accumulated saturated steam is also used to provide up to two hours of thermal storage at the plant. KSO condenser is cooled with a dry cooling system, a natural draft condenser that uses towers to distribute air across fin blades in order to dissipate heat.

The project has been developed by the Spanish company Abengoa, and the project was financed with help from Industrial Development Corporation (IDC) and community group, Khi Community Trust.

== Accident ==
In November 2014, a crane collapse on site during construction killed two and injured seven. The accident was largely responsible for the project commencing commercial operation fourteen months later than scheduled.

== Gallery ==
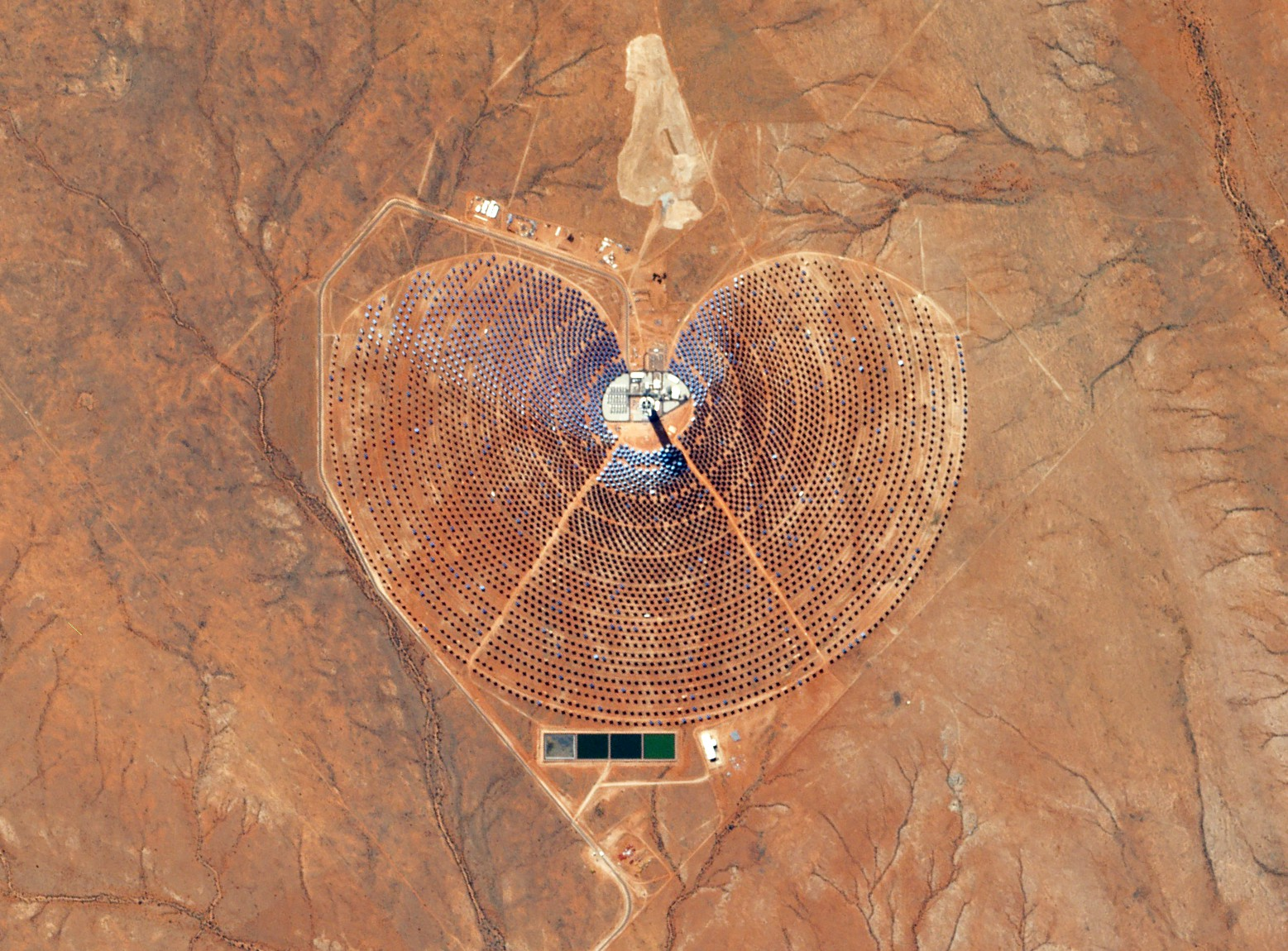
Khi Solar One, 50 MW, 180 GWh, solar power tower thermal plant

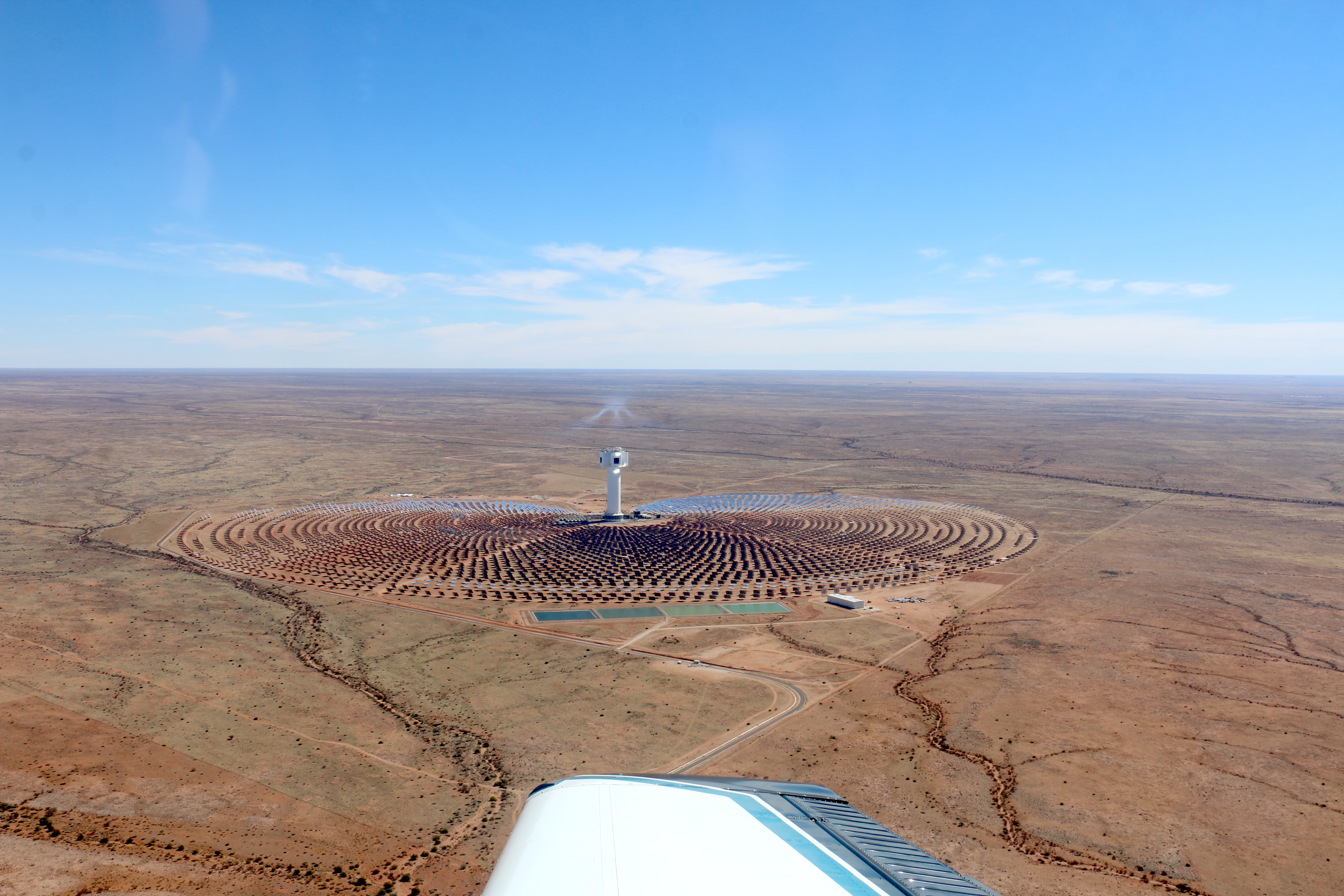
high oblique aerial photograph of Khi Solar One (Picture October 2016)

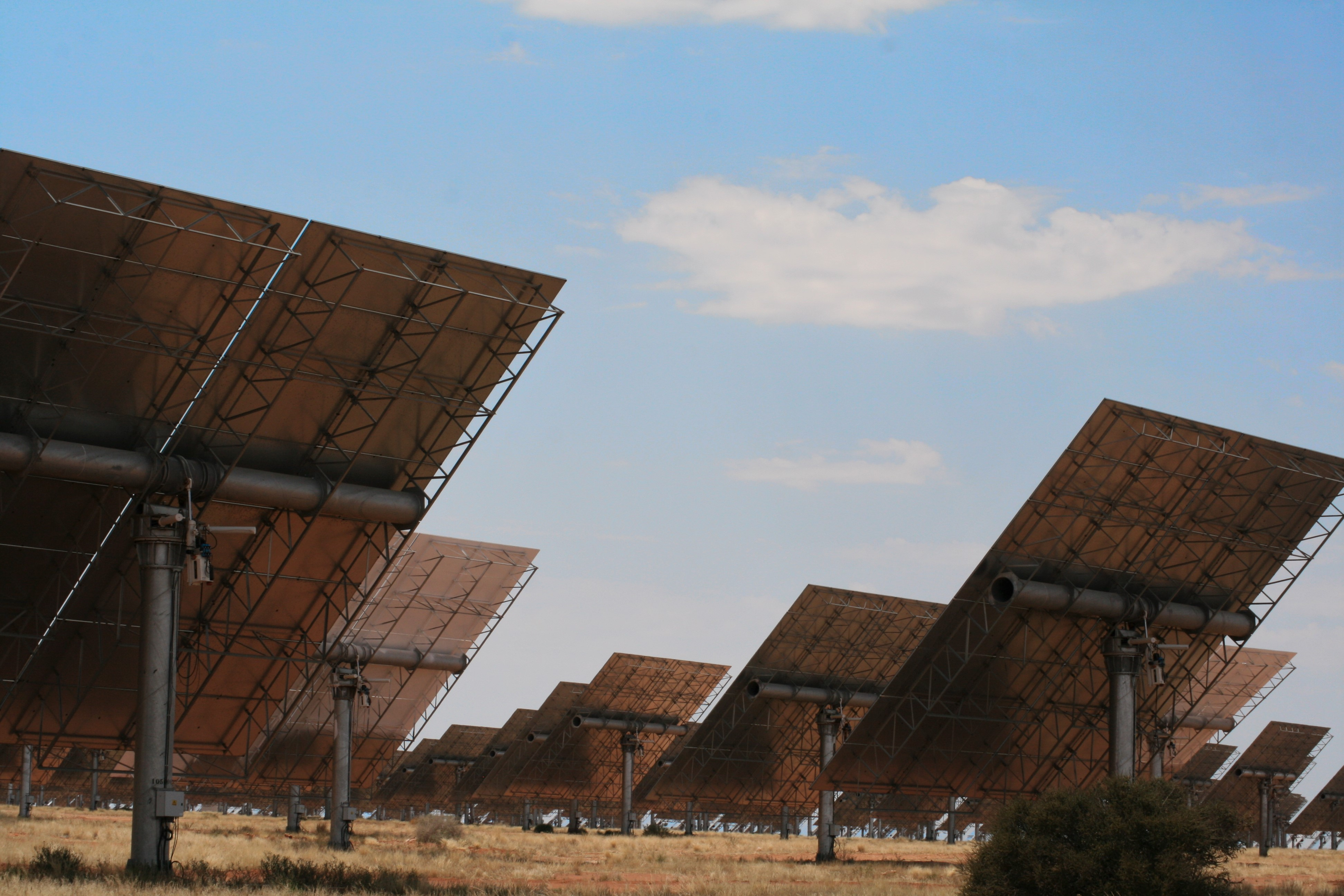
Detail of mirrors

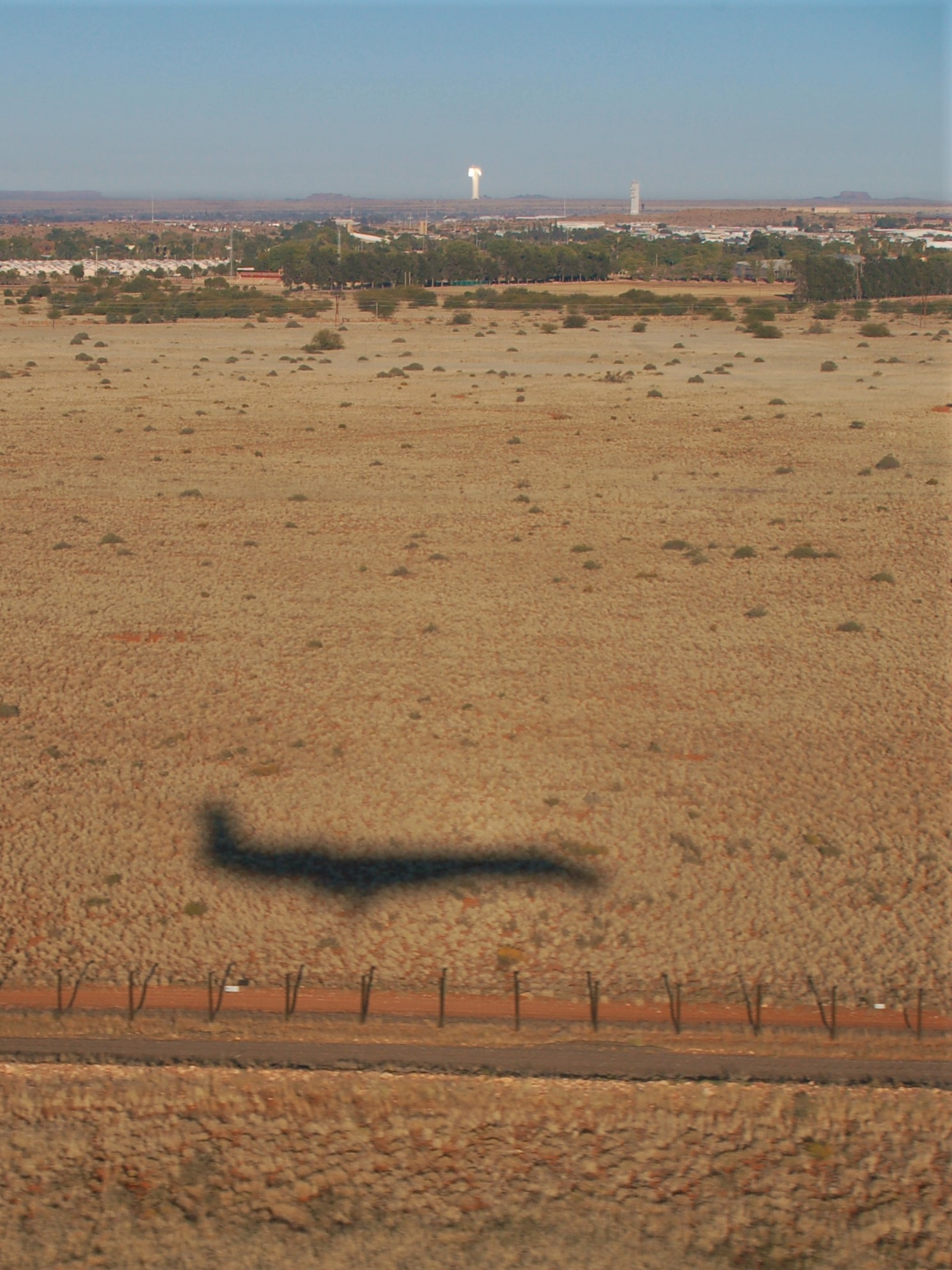
Khi Solar One tower as seen from a plane just before landing at Upington Airport

== Abengoa Bankruptcy ==
In November 2015, Abengoa started insolvency proceedings. Khi Solar One is one of the assets which Abengoa could be looking to sell.

On 27 December 2016, Abengoa received a “Provisional Acceptance Certificate”, officially handing the plant to its owner Khi Solar One Pty Ltd. Abengoa has a 51% stake, Industrial Development Corporation (IDC) has a 29% stake and Khi Community Trust has a 20% stake in that society. Abengoa will take on the operation and maintenance of the plant. The plant output is sold to grid operator Eskom under a 20-year PPA (Power Purchase Agreement).

Khi Solar One demonstrated in early 2016, up to 24 consecutive hours of operation.

== See also ==
- List of power stations in South Africa
- List of solar thermal power stations
- Solar thermal energy
