= Solar Euromed =

Concentrated solar power technology

- Type: Privately held
- Industry: Concentrated Solar Power Technology
- Founded: 2007
- Defunct: 2016
- Headquarters: Dijon, France
- Website: solareuromed.com

Solar Euromed was a technology group based in France specializing in concentrated solar power technology, and was active from 2007 until 2016.

The company provided concentrated solar power systems based on the concept of direct steam generation and linear Fresnel optics, and was developed together with the French National Centre for Scientific Research, and the French Atomic Energy and Alternative Energies Commission.

== History ==
- In 2007, Solar Euromed developed the Solenha project, ultimately classified as Seveso, enabling a greater knowledge in the environmental impact assessment of parabolic trough technology.
- In 2009, the group launched its technology development plan, funded by the French innovation fund Oseo and the European Union, which initially resulted in a Fresnel-based pilot plant located at the Themis solar energy R&D platform in the Pyreneans.
- In 2010, the company signed a 2 GW agreement with the Republic of Sudan for the development, construction and operation of CSP plants to be implemented over the next decade. A few weeks later, Solar Euromed signed a power purchase agreement for the realization of the first 250 MW.
- In 2011, it acquired a Corsican construction permit for the implementation of the largest solar thermal power plant in France set to demonstrate Solar Euromed’s proprietary Fresnel-based technology at utility scale.
- In September 2015, the company was placed under administration. It was shut down in September 2016.

== Technology ==
Solar Euromed's technology used long and narrow segments of mirror that pivot to reflect the sunlight onto a fixed absorber tube located at the common focal line of the reflectors. A secondary reflector enables the ability to have a higher heat flux, and homogeneous heating of the absorber tube, which can generate temperatures up to 450 °C (842 °F). Solar Euromed's solutions included a large scale assembly of Fresnel reflector modules working with direct steam generation at high temperature, a thermal storage capacity, a scheme of assembly enabling farming under the reflectors due to the high positioning of the structures, and the usage of recyclable materials to limit waste.

In partnership with two French R&D centers (CNRS and CEA), Solar Euromed implemented this technology development into a fully instrumented MW-size pilot plant called Augustin Fresnel 1 located in the French Pyreneans.

== Alba Nova 1 ==
Located in Ghisonaccia, Corsica. Alba Nova 1 is Solar Euromed's CSP demonstration plant for which a construction permit was already secured for a net power output of 12 MW producing electricity equivalent of the consumption of 10,000 households, thus serving as a bridge between the pilot phase and the anticipated deployment in the MENA region. It was the first CSP project to be authorized in France since more than 30 years.

== See also ==
- List of concentrating solar thermal power companies
- List of solar thermal power stations
