= Sierra SunTower =

Solar power plant in Lancaster, California, U.S.

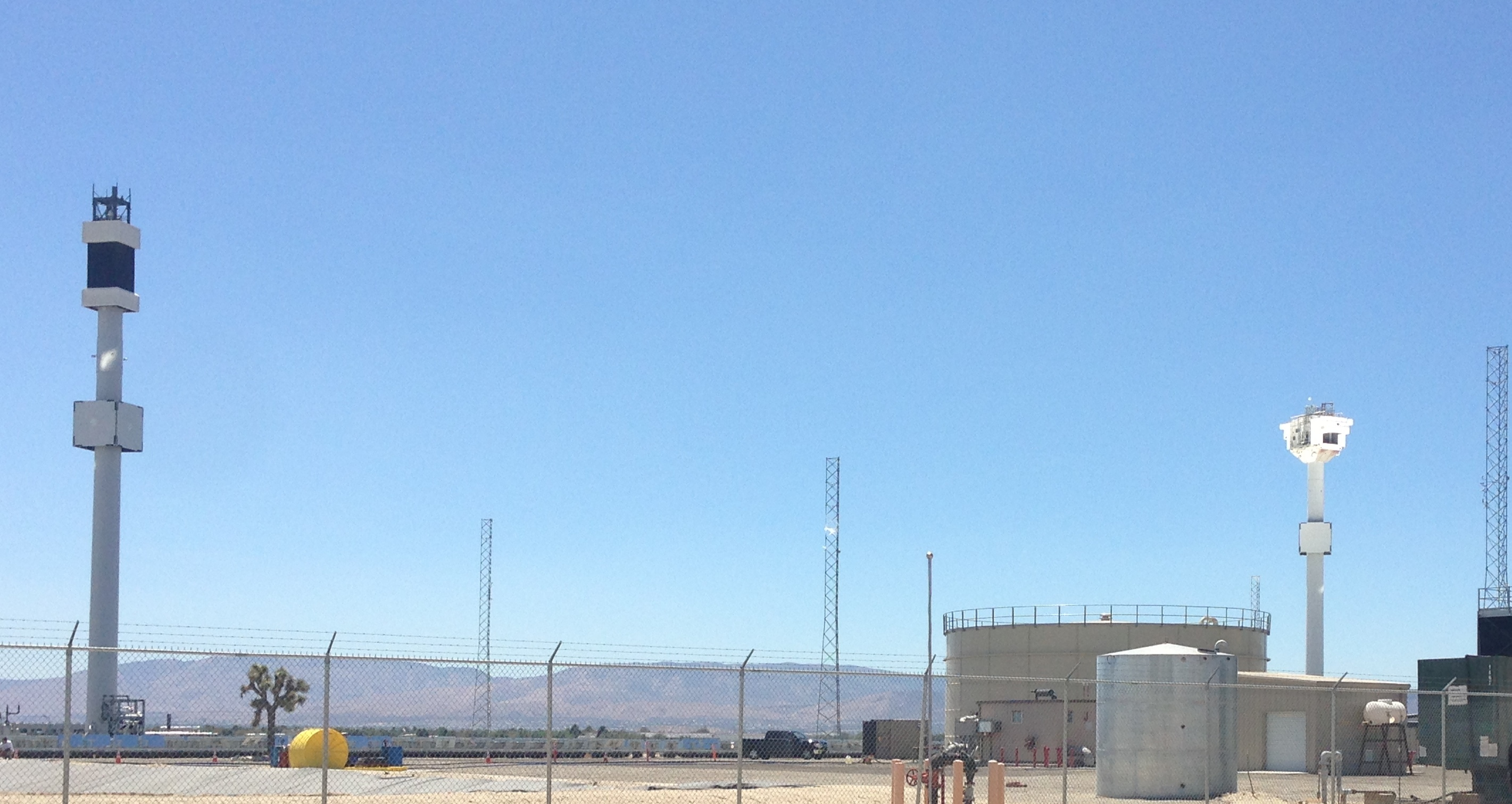
- The Sierra SunTower power plant in Lancaster, California
- Country: United States
- Location: Mojave Desert, California
- Coordinates: 34°43′53″N 118°08′19″W
- Status: Operational
- Construction began: 2009; 17 years ago
- Commission date: 2010; 16 years ago
- Decommission date: December 2014
- Owner: eSolar
- Operator: eSolar

Solar farm
- Type: CSP
- CSP technology: Solar power tower
- Collectors: 24,000
- Site area: 20 acres (0 km^{2})

Power generation
- Nameplate capacity: 5 MW
- Annual net output: 540 MWh

External links
- Commons: Related media on Commons

Sierra SunTower was a 5 MW commercial concentrating solar power (CSP) plant built and operated by eSolar. The plant is located in Lancaster, California. As of mid-September, 2022, the two towers that were the center of the facility are no longer standing. However the rest of the plant is still present.

== Overview ==
Sierra SunTower was designed to validate eSolar's technology at full scale, effectively eliminating scaleup risks, and to serve as a model from which future plants of this type would be built.

The Sierra SunTower facility was based on power tower CSP technology. The plant had an array of heliostats which reflected solar radiation to a tower-mounted thermal receiver. The concentrated solar energy boiled water in the receiver to produce steam. The steam was piped to a turbine generator which converted the energy to electricity. The steam coming out of the turbine was condensed and pressurized back into the receiver.

== History ==
In the summer of 2009, eSolar unveiled the 5 MW Sierra SunTower plant, a commercial power facility in Lancaster, California, to demonstrate the efficacy of this CSP technology. The Sierra SunTower was connected to the Southern California Edison (SCE) grid and, in spring 2010, it was the only commercial CSP tower facility in North America.

At the plant's official unveiling, California Governor Arnold Schwarzenegger praised the eSolar solution, "...proving that California's energy and environmental leadership are advancing carbon-free, cost-effective energy that can be used around the world."

However, the plant was only able to operate on days when the sun was fully unobstructed. As of 2015, California had two operational solar power tower projects online: the 392-megawatt Ivanpah Solar Electric Generating System in San Bernardino County near the Mojave National Preserve, and eSolar's Sierra SunTower. At the end of 2014, the two combined only generated 397 megawatts for the year.

== Shutdown ==
In 2015, the Sierra SunTower was shut down for commercial operation, as it was deemed to be too costly to operate except on the sunniest of days.

== Location ==
The project site occupied approximately 8 hectares (20 acres) in an arid valley in the southwestern corner of the Mojave Desert at 35° north latitude, on private farm land.

== Equipment ==
The Sierra SunTower included two modules. 24,000 heliostats, divided between four sub-fields, tracked the sun and focused its energy onto two tower-mounted receivers. The focused heat converted feedwater piped to the receivers into superheated steam that drove a reconditioned 1947 GE turbine generator to produce electricity. The steam passed through a steam condenser, reverted to water through cooling, and the process repeated.

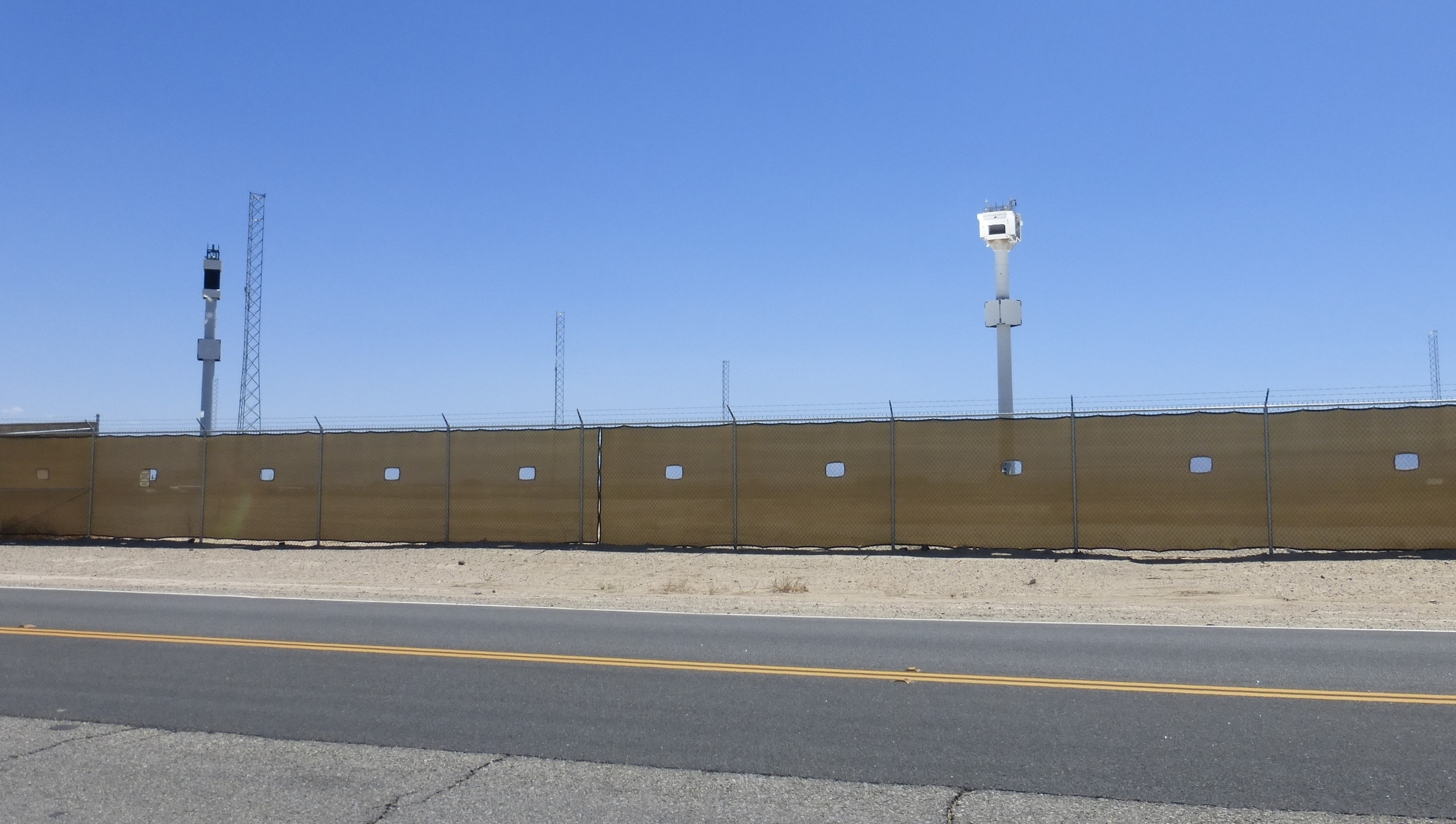
The Sierra SunTower power plant

During the 12 months of construction, Sierra SunTower created over 300 temporary jobs. During operation, the site employed 21 permanent employees.

== Output ==
Sierra SunTower was certified by the California Energy Commission as a renewable energy facility. Power from the facility was sold under a Power Purchase Agreement (PPA) with SCE, with a projected maximum output sufficient to power approximately 4,000 homes.

The 5 MW output from Sierra SunTower displaced CO_{2} emissions by 7,000 tons per year, an amount equivalent to planting 5,265 acres (21.31 km^{2}) of trees, removing 1,368 automobiles from the road, or saving 650,000 gallons of gasoline.

== Awards ==
In December 2009, editors of Power Engineering magazine selected Sierra SunTower as the winner of the "Best Renewable Project". The award distinguished Sierra as an exceptional power generation project toward meeting growing global demand.

In February 2010, Sierra SunTower won Renewable Energy World's "Renewable Project of the Year" award. The award recognized eSolar's achievements in the clean energy industry by naming Sierra SunTower an exceptional breakthrough in the commercialization of solar thermal technology.

== Performance data ==
According to the US Treasury Department - Performance Report and Certification Form, the eSolar Sierra SunTower generated 539 MWh (MegaWatt-hour) of electricity from August 1, 2010, to July 31, 2011.

A total of 539 MWh of gross electrical energy was generated at Sierra from August 1, 2010 to July 31, 2011. This was approximately 12.6% of the expected power generation of the initial estimate of 4270 MWh.

== Production ==
Generation (MW·h) of Sierra SunTower Solar Gen Station
Year	Jan	Feb	Mar	Apr	May	Jun	Jul	Aug	Sep	Oct	Nov	Dec	Total
2010	1	13	31	47	66	75	73	65	53	24	20	8	476
2011	0	12	17	27	34	43	37	38	26	21	7	7	270
2012	2	23	57	82	113	122	105	83	78	61	31	23	780
2013	0	0	0	0	0	0	0	0	0	0	0	94	94
2014	0	0	0	0	0	0	0	0	0	0	0	0	0
Total													1,620

== See also ==
- List of concentrating solar thermal power companies
- List of photovoltaic power stations
- List of solar thermal power stations
- Renewable energy in the United States
- Renewable portfolio standard
- Solar power in the United States
- Solar power plants in the Mojave Desert
