= Solar power tower =

Type of solar furnace with a tower receiving focused light

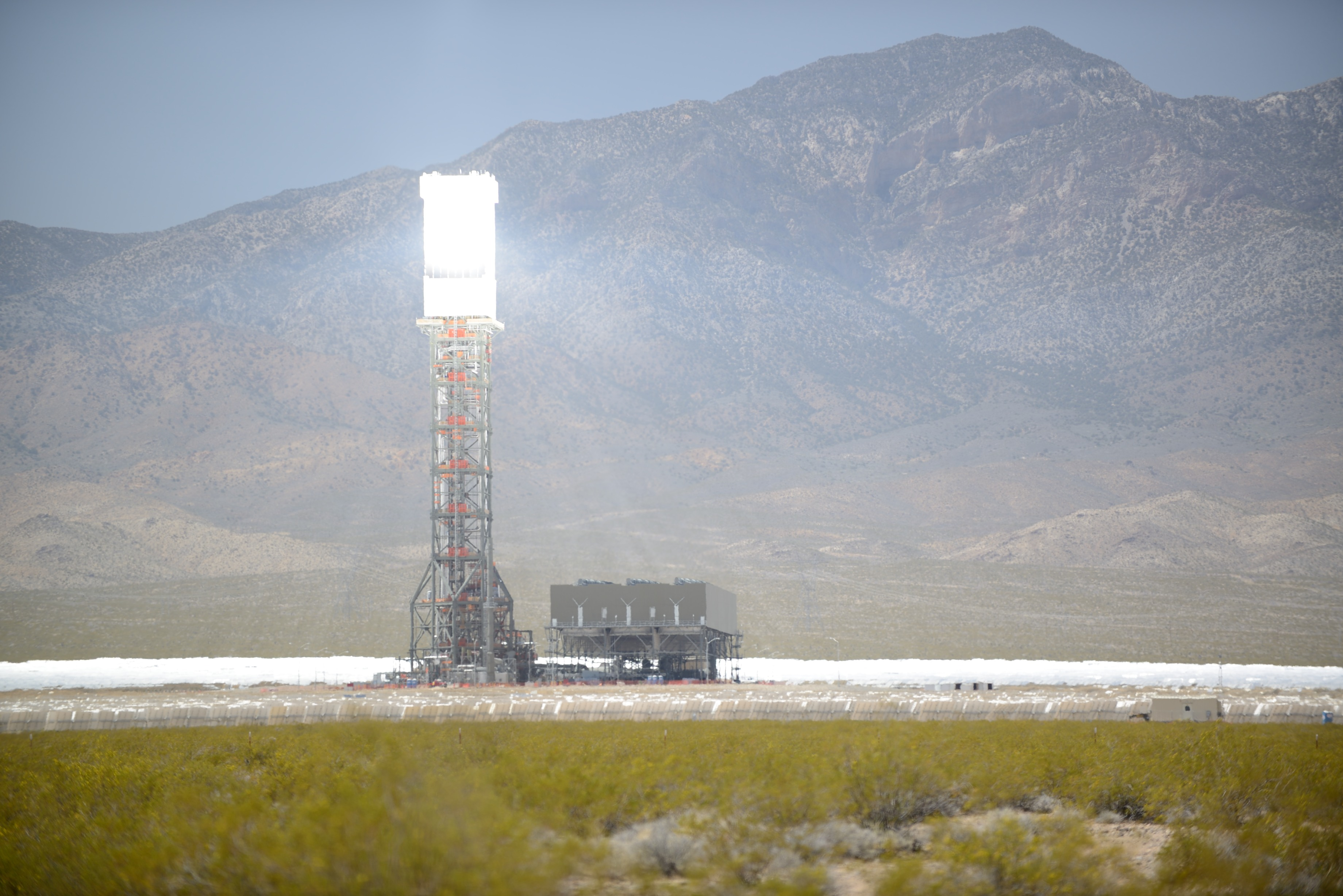
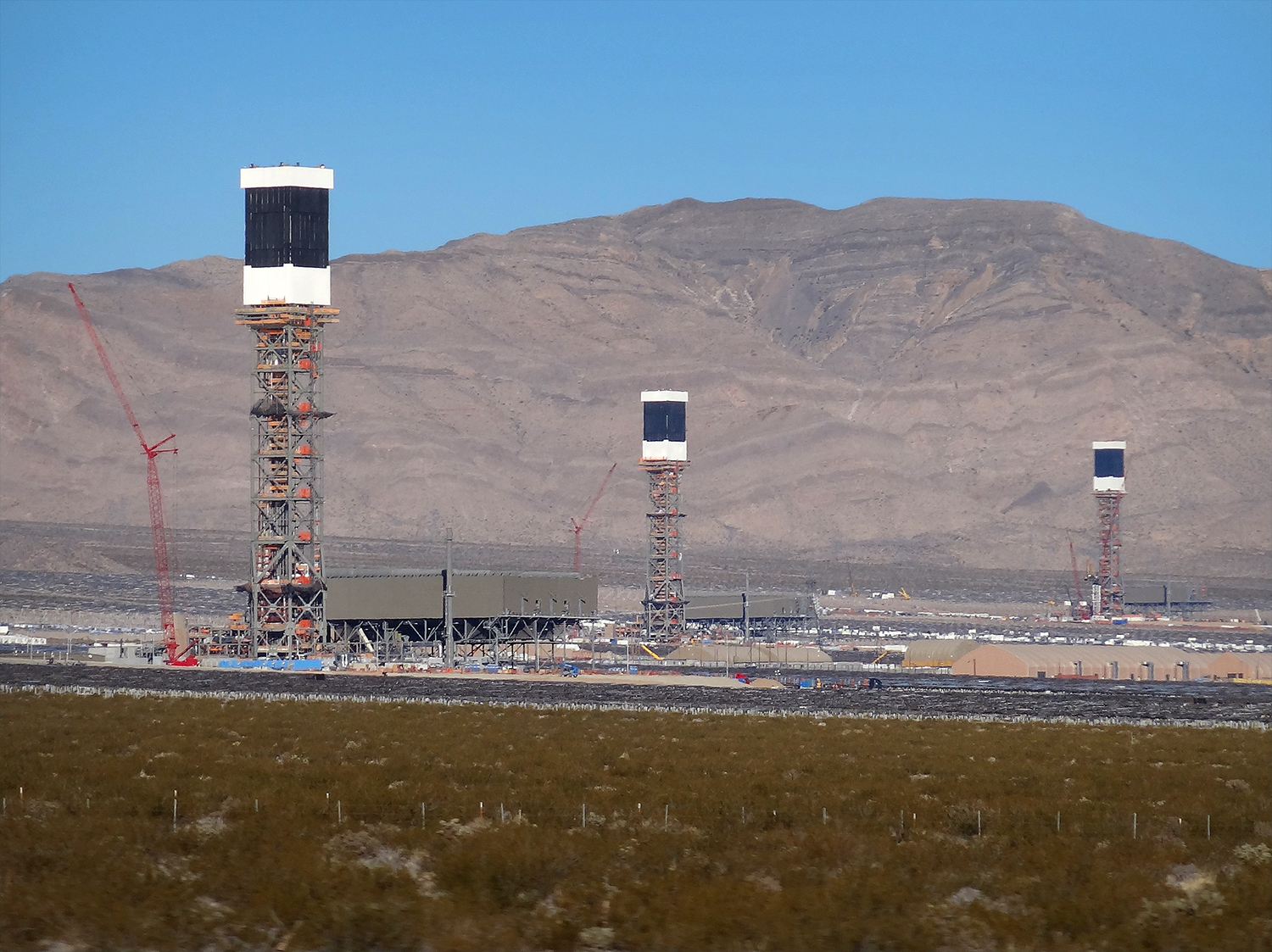
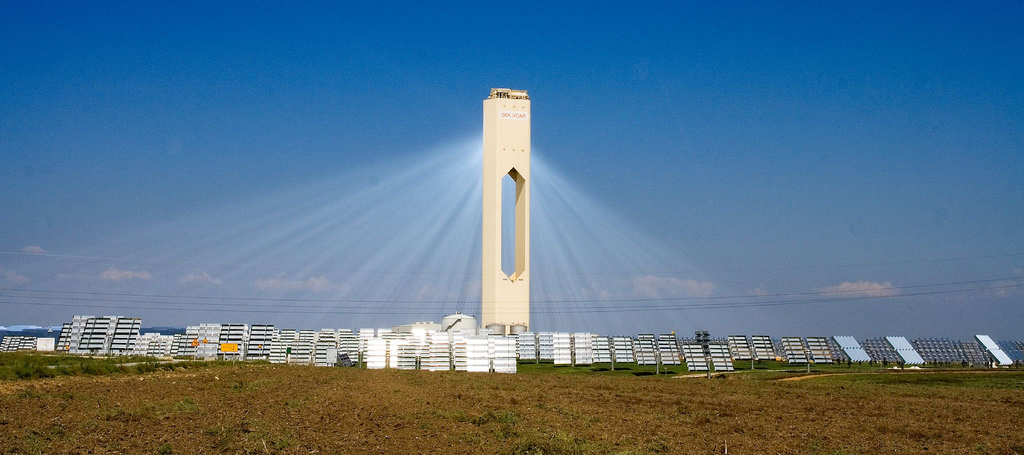
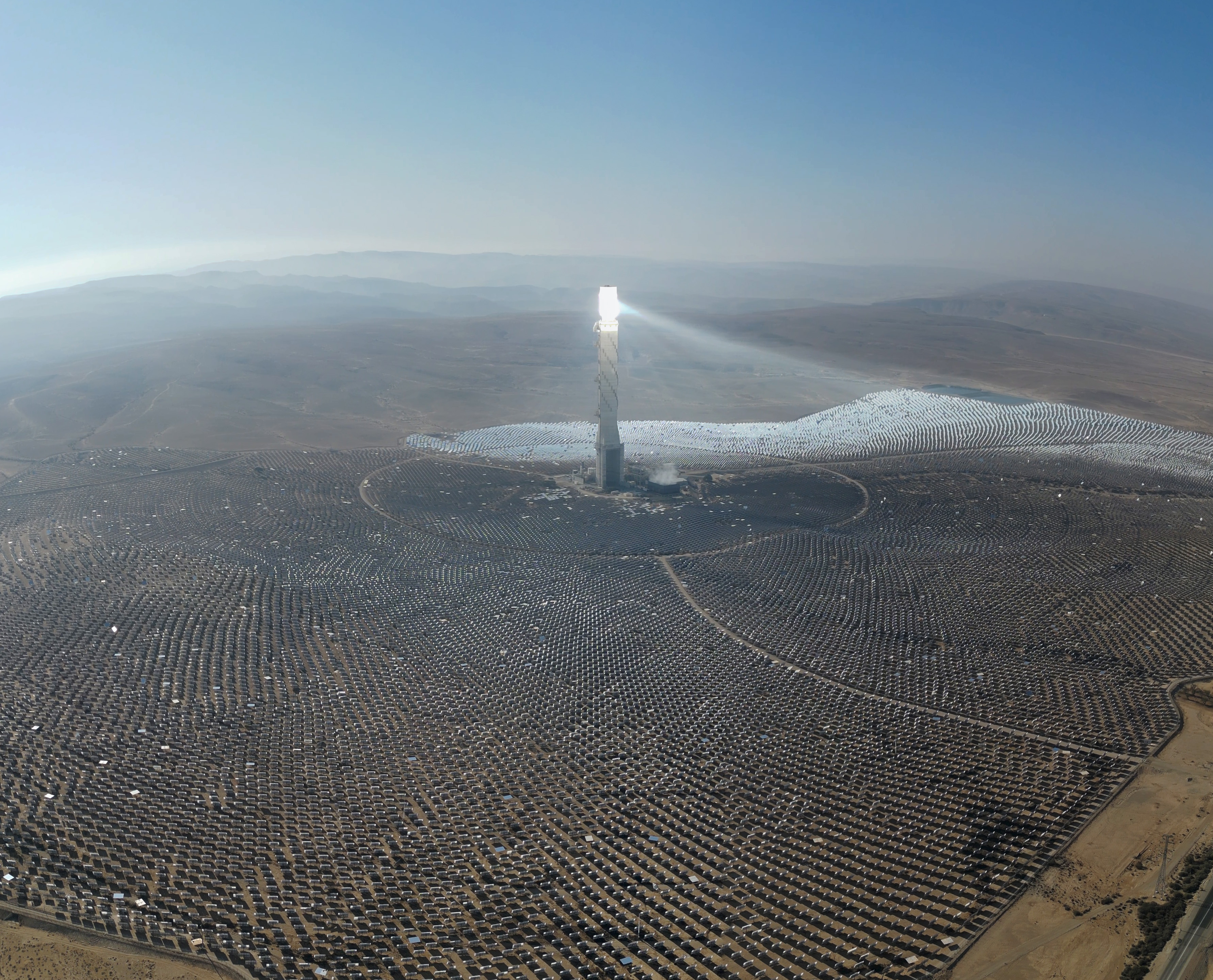
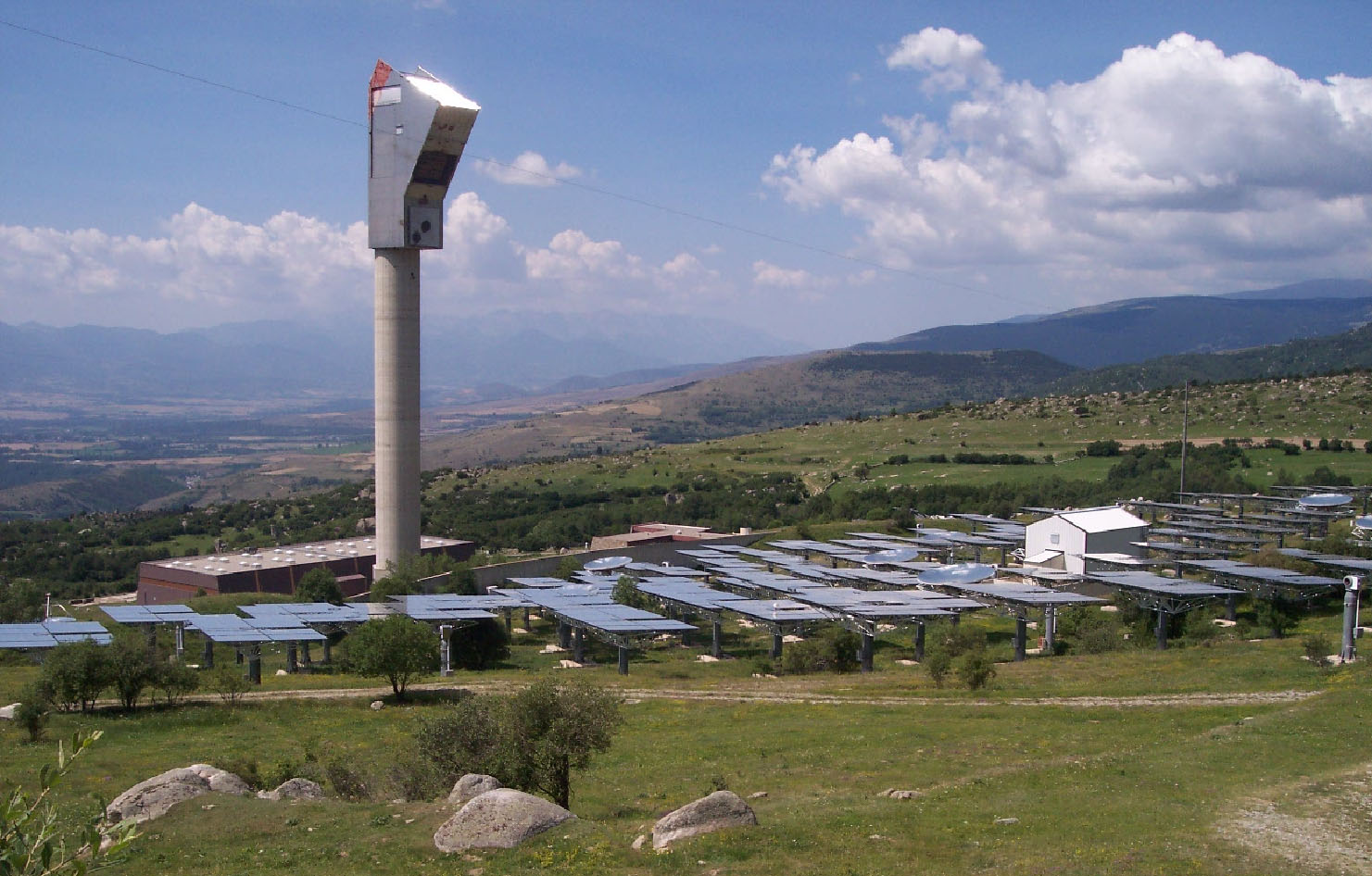
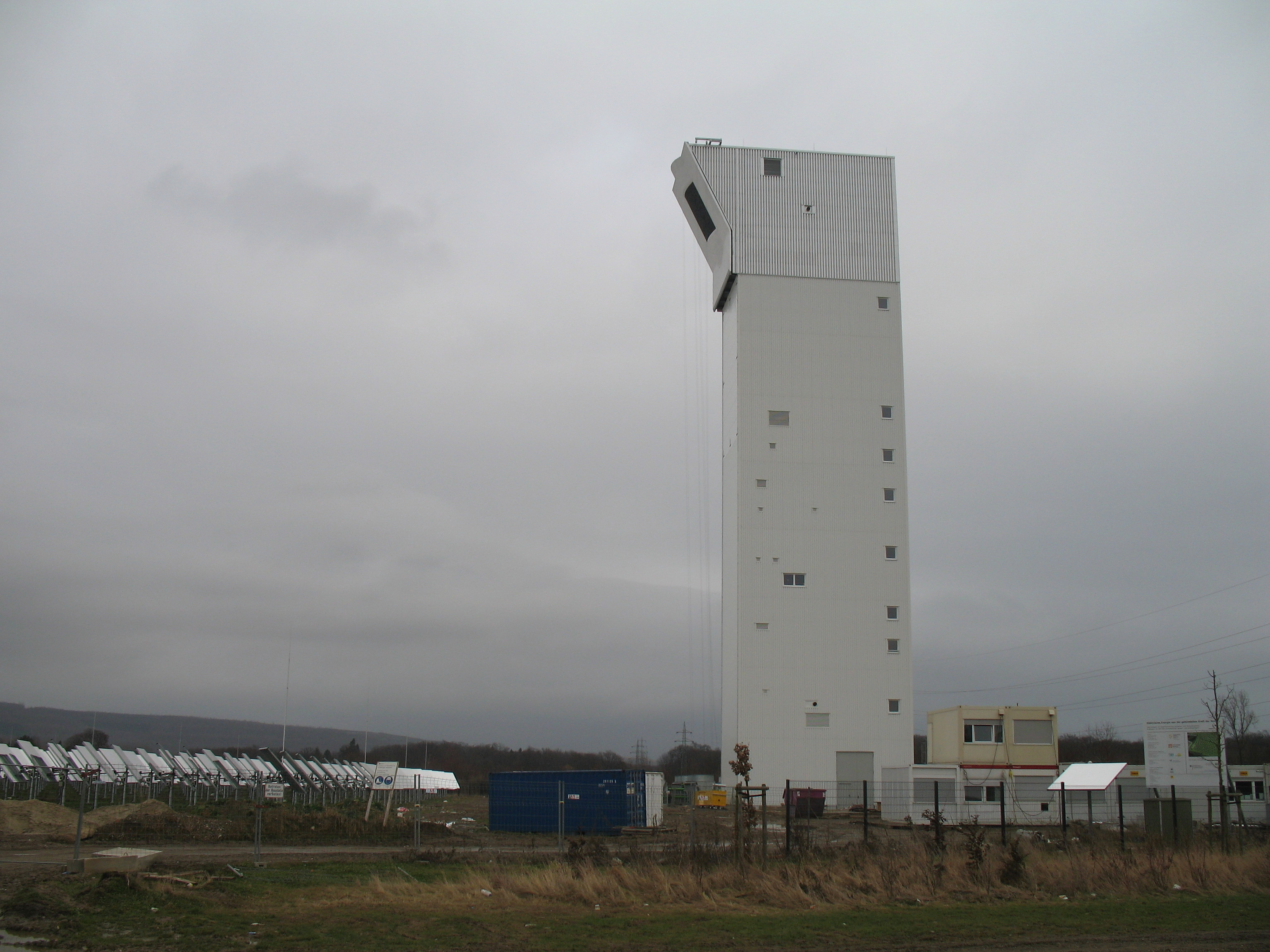
Concentrating solar power towers:
- Top: Solar towers of the Ivanpah facility, the world's largest solar thermal power station in the Mojave Desert, southeastern California
- Middle: PS10, the world's first commercial solar power tower in Andalusia, Spain (left) and Ashalim Power Station in Negev, Israel (right)
- Bottom: The THEMIS solar power tower in the Eastern Pyrenees, France (left) and the German experimental Jülich tower (right)

A solar power tower, also known as 'central tower' power plant or 'heliostat' power plant, is a type of solar furnace using a tower to receive focused sunlight. It uses an array of flat, movable mirrors (called heliostats) to focus the sun's rays upon a collector tower (the target). Concentrating Solar Power (CSP) systems are seen as one viable solution for renewable, pollution-free energy.

Early designs used these focused rays to heat water and used the resulting steam to power a turbine. Newer designs using liquid sodium have been demonstrated, and systems using molten salts (40% potassium nitrate, 60% sodium nitrate) as the working fluids are now in operation. These working fluids have high heat capacity, which can be used to store the energy before using it to boil water to drive turbines. Storing the heat energy for later recovery allows power to be generated continuously, while the sun is shining, and for several hours after the sun has set (or been clouded over).

== Cost ==
In 2021, the US National Renewable Energy Laboratory (NREL) estimated the cost of electricity from concentrated solar with 10 hours of storage at $0.076 per kWh in 2021, $0.056 per kWh in 2030, and $0.052 per kWh in 2050. In 2007, companies such as ESolar (then backed by Google.org) were developing cheap, low maintenance, mass producible heliostat components that were to reduce costs in the near future. ESolar's design used large numbers of small mirrors (1.14 m^{2}), to reduce costs for installing mounting systems such as concrete, steel, drilling, and cranes. In October 2017, an article in GreenTech Media suggested that eSolar ceased business in late 2016.

Improvements in working fluid systems, such as moving from current two tank (hot/cold) designs to single tank thermocline systems with quartzite thermal fillers and oxygen blankets will improve material efficiency and reduce costs further.

== Design ==
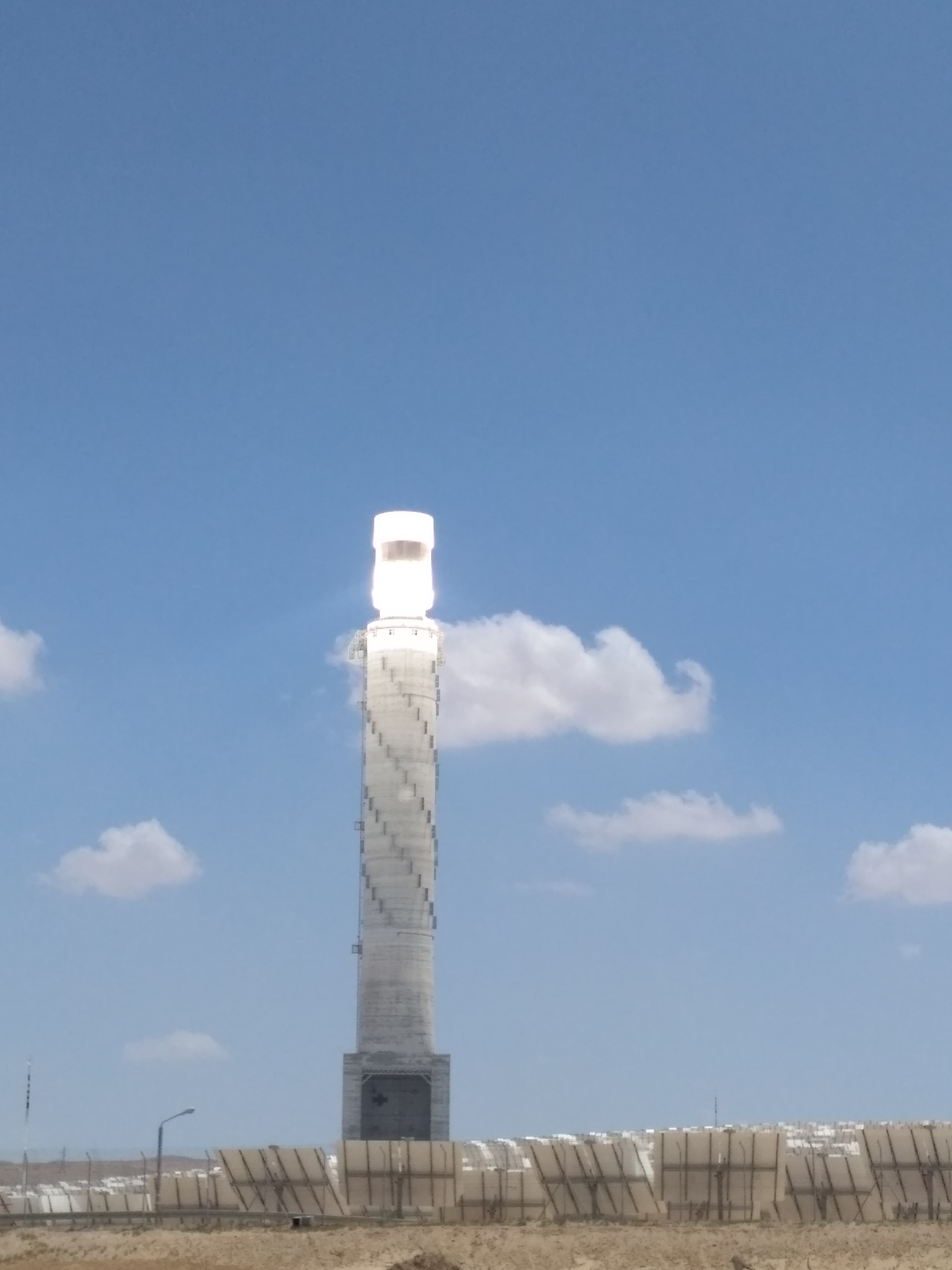
Ashalim Power Station, Israel, on its completion the tallest solar tower in the world

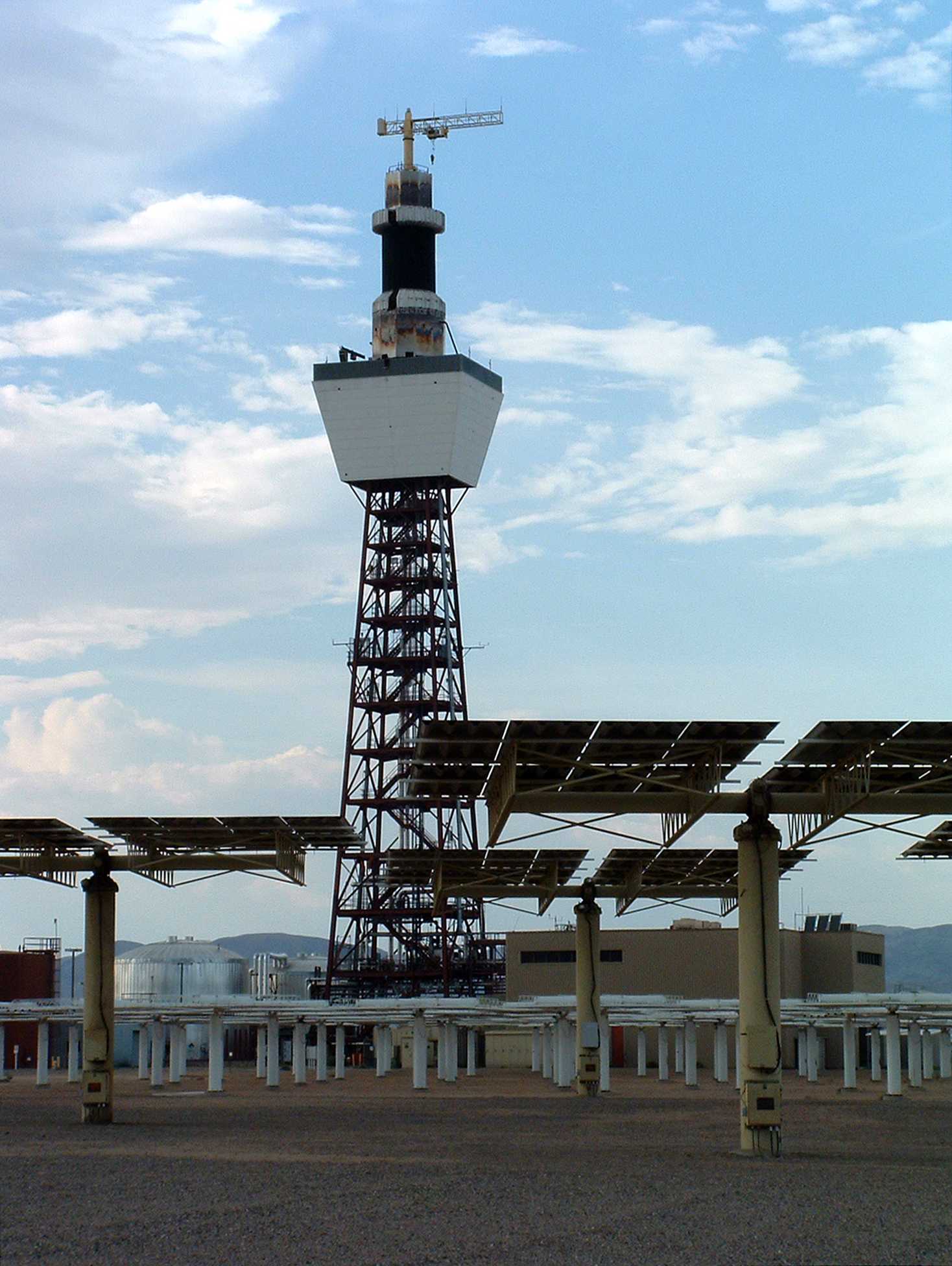
The decommissioned Solar Two in California

- Some concentrating solar power (CSP) towers are air-cooled instead of water-cooled, to avoid using limited desert water
- Flat glass is used instead of the more expensive curved glass
- Thermal storage to store the heat in molten salt containers to continue producing electricity while the sun is not shining
- Steam is heated to 500 °C (932 °F) to drive turbines that are coupled to generators which produce electricity
- Control systems to supervise and control all the plant activity including the heliostat array positions, alarms, other data acquisition and communication.

Generally, installations use from 150 hectares (1,500,000 m^{2}) to 320 hectares (3,200,000 m^{2}).

In 2023, Australia's national science agency CSIRO tested a CSP arrangement in which tiny ceramic particles fall through the beam of concentrated solar energy, the ceramic particles capable of storing a greater amount of heat than molten salt, while not requiring a container that would diminish heat transfer.

== Environmental concerns ==
There was evidence that such large area solar concentrating installations can burn birds that fly over them. Near the center of the array, temperatures can reach 550 °C (1,022 °F) which, with the solar flux itself, is enough to incinerate birds. More distant birds' feathers can be scorched, leading to the eventual death of the bird. Ivanpah reported one bird scorching in every two minutes. Workers at the Ivanpah solar power plant call these birds "streamers", as they ignite in midair and plummet to the ground trailing smoke. During testing of the initial standby position for the heliostats, 115 birds were killed as they entered the concentrated solar flux. During the first six months of operations, a total of 321 birds were killed. After altering the standby procedure to focus no more than four heliostats on any one point, there have been no further bird fatalities.

The Ivanpah Solar Power Facility is classified as a greenhouse gas emitter by the State of California because it has to burn fossil fuel for several hours each morning so that it can quickly reach its operating temperature.

== Commercial applications ==
Several companies have been involved in planning, designing, and building utility size power plants. There are numerous examples of case studies of applying innovative solutions to solar power. In a beam-down tower design, sunlight is reflected by heliostats towards an upper focal point at the top of the tower, then is reflected downwards to a receiver close to the ground. The first commercial beam-down tower was the Yumen Xinneng 50 MW tower.

== Novel applications ==
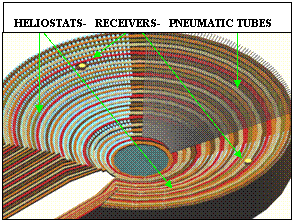
Pit Power Tower concept in Bingham Canyon mine

The Pit Power Tower combines a solar power tower and an aero-electric power tower in a decommissioned open pit mine. Traditional solar power towers are constrained in size by the height of the tower and closer heliostats blocking the line of sight of outer heliostats to the receiver. The use of the pit mine's "stadium seating" helps overcome the blocking constraint.

As solar power towers commonly use steam to drive the turbines, and water tends to be scarce in regions with high solar energy, another advantage of open pits is that they tend to collect water, having been dug below the water table. The Pit Power Tower uses low heat steam to drive the pneumatic tubes in a co-generation system. A third benefit of re-purposing a pit mine for this kind of project is the possibility of reusing mine infrastructure such as roads, buildings, and electricity.

== Solar power towers ==
=== List of solar power towers ===
| Name | Developer/Owner | Completed | Country | Town | Height m | Height ft | Collectors | Installed maximum capacity *(MW) | Yearly total energy production (GWh) |
|---|---|---|---|---|---|---|---|---|---|
| Dawn | Synhelion | 2024 | Germany | Jülich | 20 m | 65.6 ft | | | |
| Noor Energy 1 | ACWA Power | 2022 | United Arab Emirates | Saih Al-Dahal, Dubai | 262.44 m | 861 ft | | | |
| Ashalim Power Station | Megalim Solar Power | 2019 | Israel | Negev Desert | 260 m | 853 ft | 50,600 | 121 MW | 320 |
| Ouarzazate Solar Power Station | Moroccan Agency for Sustainable Energy | 2019 | Morocco | Ouarzazate | 250 m | 820 ft | 7,400 | 150 MW | 500 |
| Cerro Dominador Solar Thermal Plant | Acciona (51%) and Abengoa (49%) | 2021 | Chile | Calama | 250 m | 820 ft | 10,600 | 110 MW | |
| Redstone Solar Thermal Power | ACWA Power | 2023 | South Africa | Postmasburg, Northern Cape Province | | | | 100 MW | |
| Shouhang Dunhuang 100 MW Phase II | Beijing Shouhang IHW | 2018 | China | Dunhuang | 220 m | 722 ft | 12,000 | 100 MW | 390 |
| Qinghai Gonghe CSP | | 2019 | China | Gonghe | 210 m | 689 ft | | 50 MW | 156.9 |
| Khi Solar One | Abengoa | 2016 | South Africa | Upington | 205 m | 673 ft | 4,120 | 50 MW | 180 |
| Crescent Dunes Solar Energy Project | SolarReserve | 2016 | United States | Tonopah | 200 m | 656 ft | 10,347 | 110 MW | 500 |
| Supcon Solar Delingha | Supcon Solar | 2016 | China | Delingha | 200 m | 656 ft | | 50 MW | 146 |
| Haixi 50 MW CSP Project | Luneng Qinghai Guangheng New Energy | 2019 | China | Haixi Zhou | 188 m | 617 ft | 4,400 | 50 MW | |
| Hami 50 MW CSP Project | Supcon Solar | 2019 | China | Hami | 180 m | 590 ft | | 50 MW | |
| PS20 solar power plant | Abengoa Solar | 2009 | Spain | Sanlúcar la Mayor | 165 m | 541 ft | 1,255 | 20 MW | 48 |
| Gemasolar Thermosolar Plant | Torresol Energy | 2011 | Spain | Sevilla | 140 m | 460 ft | 2,650 | 19.9 MW | 80 |
| Ivanpah Solar Power Facility (3 towers) | BrightSource Energy | 2014 | United States | Mojave Desert | 139.9 m | 459 ft | 173,500 | 392 MW | 650 |
| Shouhang Dunhuang 10 MW Phase I | | 2018 | China | Dunhuang | 138 m | 453 ft | 1,525 | 10 MW | |
| Sundrop Farms | Aalborg CSP | 2016 | Australia | Port Augusta | 127 m | 417 ft | 23,712 | 1.5 MW | |
| Dahan Power Plant | Institute of Electrical Engineering of Chinese Academy of Sciences | 2012 | China | Dahan | 118 m | 387 ft | 100 | 1 MW | |
| PS10 solar power plant | Abengoa Solar | 2007 | Spain | Sanlúcar la Mayor | 115 m | 377 ft | 624 | 11 MW | 23.4 |
| The Solar Project | U.S. Department of Energy | 1981 | United States | Mojave Desert | 100 m | 328 ft | 1,818 later 1,926 | 7 MW, later 10 MW | na, demolished |
| Supcon Solar Delingha 10MW (2 towers) | Supcon Solar | 2013 | China | Delingha | 100 m | 328 ft | | 10 MW | |
| National Solar Thermal Test Facility | U.S. Department of Energy | 1978 | United States | Albuquerque, New Mexico | 60 m | 200 ft | | 1 MW (5-6 MWt) | na, demonstrator |
| Jülich Solar Tower | German Aerospace Center | 2008 | Germany | Jülich | 60 m | 200 ft | 2000 | 1.5 MW | na, demonstrator |
| Greenway CSP Mersin Solar Tower | Greenway CSP | 2013 | Turkey | Mersin | 60 m | 200 ft | 510 | 1 MW (5 MWt) | |
| ACME Solar Tower | ACME Group | 2011 | India | Bikaner | 46 m | 150 ft | 14,280 | 2.5 MW | |
| Sierra SunTower (2 towers) | eSolar | 2010 | United States | Mojave Desert | 46 m | 150 ft | 24,000 | 5 MW | na, demolished |
| Jemalong CSP Pilot Plant | | 2017 | Australia | Jemalong | 5x 27 m | 5x 89 ft | 3,500 | 1.1 MW (6 MWt) | |

== See also ==
- Concentrated solar power
- Particle receiver
- Feed-in tariff
- List of concentrating solar thermal power companies
- List of solar thermal power stations
- National Solar Thermal Test Facility (NSTTF)
- Solar furnace
- Solar thermal energy
