= List of concentrating solar thermal power companies =

This is a list of concentrating solar thermal power (CSTP) companies. The CSTP industry finished a first round of new construction during 2006/7, a resurgence after more than 15 years of commercial dormancy.

The CSTP industry saw many new entrants and new manufacturing facilities in 2008. Active project developers grew to include Ausra, Mulk Enpar Renewable Energy, Bright Source Energy, eSolar, FPL Energy, Infinia, Sopogy, and Stirling Energy Systems in the USA. In Spain, Abengoa Solar, Acciona, Iberdrola Renovables, and Sener were active in 2008.

== List of notable companies ==
Parabolic trough collectors:

- Aalborg CSP
- Abengoa
- Acciona
- GlassPoint Solar
- SENER
- Solar Millennium (bankruptcy)
- Soliterm Group
- Sopogy Micro CSP

Solar tower technology:

- BrightSource Energy / Luz II
- Torresol Energy

Linear Fresnel:

- AREVA Solar, formerly Ausra
- Novatec Solar

5th Generation Solar Concentrator

- ASC Water & Energy

Unconfirmed:

- eSolar
- Cobra
- Iberdrola
- SENER
- Solar Euromed
- Solarlite
- SolarReserve
- Stirling Energy Systems (filed for bankruptcy)
- Wizard Power

== See also ==
- List of energy storage projects
- List of photovoltaics companies
- List of solar thermal power stations
- Renewable energy industry
