= Jülich Solar Tower =

High experimental concentrated solar power

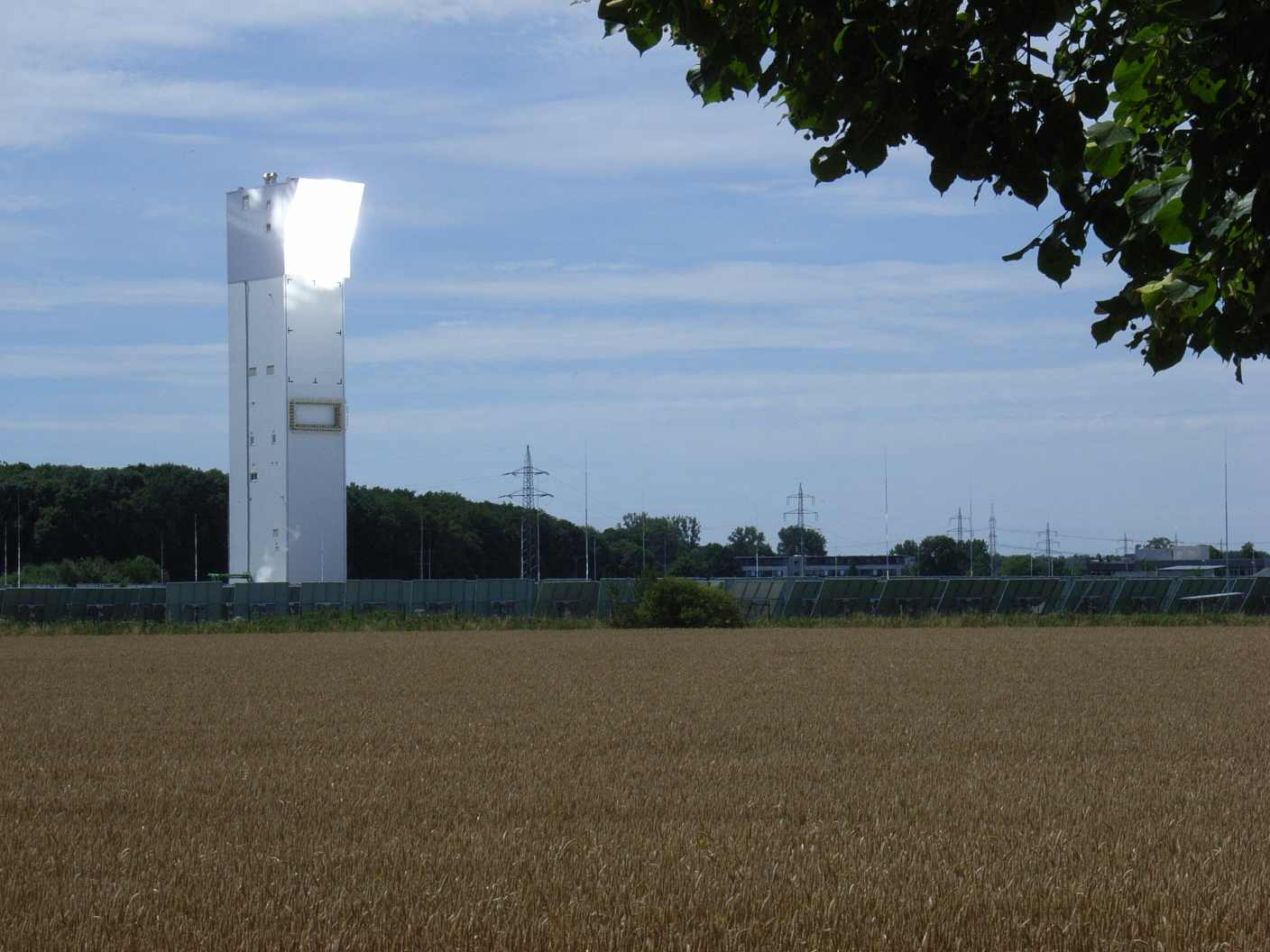
- Country: Germany
- Location: Jülich
- Coordinates: 50°54′54″N 6°23′16″E
- Status: Operational
- Owner: German Aerospace Center

Solar farm
- Type: CSP
- CSP technology: Solar power tower
- Collectors: 2000

External links
- Commons: Related media on Commons

Jülich Solar Tower is a 60-metre (200 ft) high experimental concentrated solar power (CSP) tower, Germany's sole plant using this type of solar power technology. In September 2008 the plant was put into operation on a trial basis. Over 2,000 dual-axis sun-tracking mirrors heat air to 700 °C, which is used to generate steam which flows through a turbine to generate electricity. Insulated steel tanks allow storage of heat for 1.5 hours in the event of clouds passing over. The total electric output of the plant is 1.5 MW. In 2011 it was sold to the German Aerospace Center.

== See also ==
- List of solar thermal power stations
- Renewable energy in the European Union
- Solar thermal energy
- The Solar Project
