= Solarlite =

Solarlite CSP Technology GmbH
- Industry: Engineering, procurement, construction
- Founded: 2013
- Headquarters: Duckwitz, Mecklenburg-Western Pomerania, Germany
- Key people: Joachim Krüger (CEO)
- Products: Solar thermal energy production
- Website: Official website

Solarlite CSP Technology GmbH, located in Mecklenburg-Pomerania, Germany, develops decentralized solar-thermal parabolic trough power plants (concentrated solar power) and process heat plants.

== Technology ==
Solarlite has tested the direct steam generation (DSG) concept in three pilot projects in Thailand and Germany. The results indicated that a higher operating temperature may be achievable with DSG.

The Solarlite SL 4600 parabolic trough can generate temperatures up to 400°C. Each panel has an aperture width of 4.6 m and is made of composite materials combined with a thin glass mirror. This mirror reflects up to 95% of the sun's radiation onto the absorber pipe positioned at the ideal focus of the parabolic mirror. Water passing through the receiver pipe is heated up by the concentrated reflected sun radiation and is converted into steam within a controlled process. A turbine generator then uses the steam to produce electricity. Residual heat can be used for other applications such as seawater desalination or for absorption cooling.

The basic element of the Solarlite 4600 collector is the Solarlite composite panel, which has dimensions of 2.3 m width and 1 m length. These panels are combined together to form one segment with an aperture width of 4.6 m and 12 m length. It is possible to connect ten of these segments to form one collector, thus reaching up to 120 m in length. These collectors are combined together to form rows (collectors aligned in 1 axis in the north-south direction) and loops, which are collectors that are connected in series, where the cold fluid enters at one end and the hot fluid leaves at the other end. The collector is moved from east to west to track the sun by means of a hydraulic drive system. The modular concept of Solarlite allows choosing the optimal length of the collector based on the specific locations' wind data. The combination of the lightweight composite and slender steel structure allows having a reduced specific weight compared to the competitors.

== Bankruptcy ==
In 2012, Solarlite was forced to declare insolvency. According to BonVenture, the reason for this was "the unexpected market shift towards photovoltaics due to the Chinese government's subsidies policy and the non-fulfillment of contractual obligations and payments by two customers". The company then reincorporated on January 1, 2013, as Solarlite CSP Technology GmbH with the same CEO, Joachim Krüger.

== Projects ==
- "TSE 1" Kanchanaburi Province, Thailand – Completed in 2011, this was the first of what was originally planned to be 15.9 MW_{e} concentrated solar power plants. Thailand's Solar Programme required that the plants be completed by 2015. However, due to complications, including Solarlite filing for bankruptcy in 2012, no other plants were built. The TSE 1 solar thermal power plant in Kanchanaburi, Thailand, was the first commercial parabolic trough plant based on direct steam generation. The plant utilized the Solarlite Trough SL4600, which incorporates composite materials and thin-glass mirrors to optimize solar radiation reflection. Its modular construction allows flexibility for smaller solar thermal plants starting from 500 kW_{e}.
- DUKE, Spain
- CompoSol
- Solarlite, Duckwitz / DLR
- TRESERT, Thailand
- Woltow, Germany

== Direct steam generation ==
Solarlite has tested the DSG concept in three pilot projects. Solarlite's adaptation of the DSG concept is based on the following advantages:

- The DSG concept is environmentally friendly and it avoids the usage of flammable and environmentally hazardous materials.
- The DSG technology helps reduce total investment costs and levelized electricity costs.
- With DSG a higher operating temperature will be achievable.
- The DSG concept already has acceptance at financial institutes; the first power plant has been financed.

== Direct steam generation 2.0 ==
Flow path concept, development and testing: In a joint research project known as "Duke" that was supported by the German Federal Ministry for the Environment, Nature Conservation and Nuclear Safety, Solarlite CSP Technology GmbH and the German Aerospace Centre tested a new version of direct steam generation.

Project aim:

- Investigation of the flow path concept under real conditions
- Demonstration of solar direct steam generation at 500 °C
- Detailed system analysis for debitable costing under consideration of the Solarlite collector

== Awards and nominations ==
- Die Finalisten des Deutsche Innovationspreises
- CSP Today Award:Solarlite GmbH was a Newcomer of the year finalist in 2010
- National Energy Globe Award Thailand 2012
- Step Award 2011 in den Kategorien Produkt und Technologie und Nachhaltigkeit
