= ESolar =

Concentrating solar power

eSolar
- Type: Venture backed private
- Industry: Concentrating Solar Power Technology and Engineering
- Founded: 2007
- Headquarters: Burbank, California, United States
- Key people: John Van Scoter (President & CEO); Bill Gross (Founder)
- Website: www.eSolar.com

eSolar is a privately held company that develops concentrating solar power (CSP) plant technology. The company was founded by the Pasadena-based business incubator Idealab in 2007. The company aims to develop a low cost alternative to fossil fuels through a combination of small heliostats, modular architecture, and a high-precision sun-tracking system. In October 2017, an article in GreenTech Media suggested that eSolar ceased business in late 2016.

== Technology ==
=== Heliostat design ===
eSolar has designed heliostats that are smaller than the industry norm, allowing for pre-fabrication, mass-manufacturing, and easy installation, thereby reducing production and installation costs. eSolar announced a new heliostat design, referred to as SCS5, during the 2013 SolarPACES Conference in Las Vegas, Nevada. SCS5 offers a more simplified design and enhanced reliability to reduce total installed solar collector system cost by more than a third.

=== Sun-tracking software ===
eSolar has developed a sun-tracking control system that is able to calibrate heliostats and monitor the performance of each heliostat within the field. Tests have shown an unprecedented pointing accuracy and high thermal concentration ratios.

=== Power tower and electricity generation ===
An array of heliostats reflect solar radiation to a tower-mounted thermal receiver. In the direct-steam configuration, the concentrated solar energy boils water in the receiver to produce steam. The steam is piped to a steam turbine generator, which converts the energy to electricity. The steam out of the turbine is condensed and pressurized back into the receiver. In the molten salt configuration, the concentrated solar energy heats molten salt to store thermal energy for future use.

=== Module ===
eSolar's field layout design is built around the concept of scalable modules. In the direct-steam configuration, each module comprises over 20,000 square meters of heliostats arranged in two subfields – north and south – which track the sun and concentrate solar energy to the tower mounted receiver. The field layout is a simple, regular design that eliminates precision surveying and ground penetration. In the molten salt configuration a hexagonal solar field consists of over 100,000 square meters of reflector area.

A 46 MW eSolar power unit consists of sixteen heliostat fields and towers, a single steam turbine generator set, and a steam condenser, with a typical footprint of approximately 100 hectares (250 acres). These basic 46 MW units are designed to be scaled up to fit specific power requirements. In the molten salt configuration, 10 modules may be aggregated to build a 100MW, 50% capacity factor solar power plant. Plants of various electric output and capacity factor may be assembled through use or varying numbers of molten salt modules.

== Sierra SunTower ==
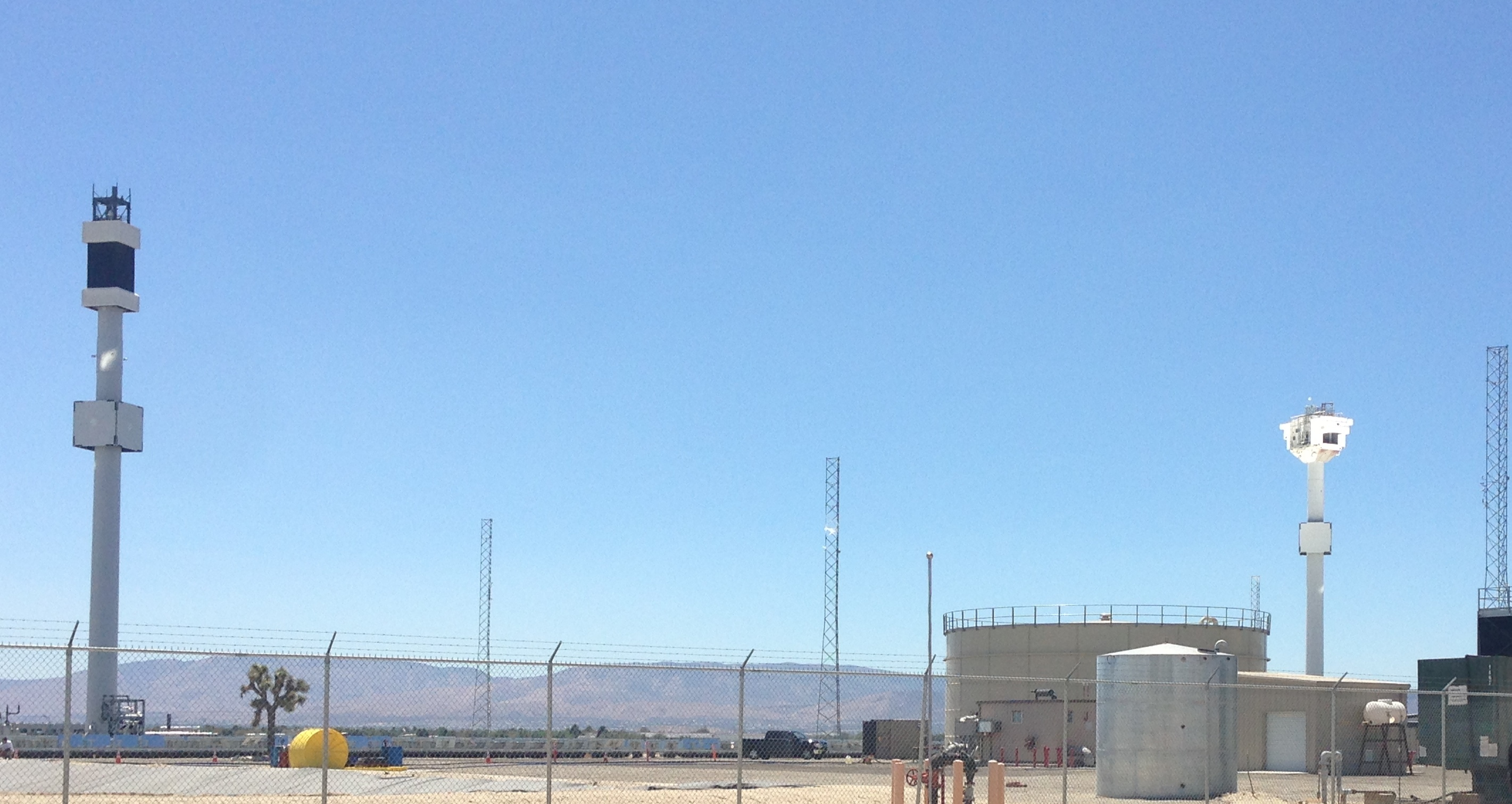
The Sierra SunTower power plant in Lancaster, California.

In the summer of 2009, eSolar unveiled the 5 MW Sierra SunTower plant, a commercial facility in Lancaster, California that demonstrated the company's technology. Sierra SunTower is interconnected to the Southern California Edison (SCE) grid and, in spring 2010, it was the only commercial CSP tower facility in North America. As of mid-August, 2018, the two towers that were the center of the facility are no longer standing. The plant, however, is still present.

Sierra SunTower included two eSolar modules. 24,000 heliostats, divided between four sub-fields, tracked the sun and focussed its energy onto two tower-mounted receivers. The focused heat converted feedwater piped to the receivers into superheated steam that drove a reconditioned 1947 GE turbine generator to produce electricity. The steam passed through a steam condenser, reverted to water through cooling, and the process repeated.

During the 12 months of construction, Sierra SunTower created over 300 temporary jobs. In operation, the site employed 21 permanent employees.

Sierra Suntower was certified by the California Energy Commission as a renewable energy facility. Power from the facility is sold under a Power Purchase Agreement (PPA) with SCE, providing renewable energy for up to 4,000 homes.

The 5 MW output from Sierra SunTower reduced CO_{2} emissions by 7,000 tons per year, an amount equivalent to planting 5,265 acres (21.31 km^{2}) of trees, removing 1,368 automobiles from the road, or saving 650,000 gallons of gasoline.

However, in 2015, the Sierra SunTower was shut down for commercial operation, as it was deemed to be too costly to operate except on the sunniest of days. Thus, it served to show the real-world problems, and unpredictable nature, of concentrated solar power.

== Performance Data from US Treasury Dept.- Performance Report and Certification Form ==
The eSolar Sierra SunTower generated 539 MWh (MegaWatt-hour) of electricity from August 1, 2010, to July 31, 2011. A total of 539 MWh of gross electrical energy has been generated at Sierra during the period Aug 1, 2010 and July 31, 2011. This is approximately 12.6% of the expected power generation of the initial estimate of 4270 MWh, a dismal result.

== Production ==
Generation (MW·h) of Sierra SunTower Solar Gen Station
Year	Jan	Feb	Mar	Apr	May	Jun	Jul	Aug	Sep	Oct	Nov	Dec	Total
2010	1	13	31	47	66	75	73	65	53	24	20	8	476
2011	0	12	17	27	34	43	37	38	26	21	7	7	270
2012	2	23	57	82	113	122	105	83	78	61	31	23	780
2013	0	0	0	0	0	0	0	0	0	0	0	94	94
2014	0	0	0	0	0	0	0	0	0	0	0	0	0
Total													1,620

== Molten salt-based solar plant ==
eSolar, with its partner, Babcock & Wilcox Power Generation Group, has been working on the design of a modular molten salt-based concentrating solar power plant since 2010. With the support from the U. S. Department of Energy, the companies try to come up with a design for plants with flexibility of the sizes from 50 to 200 MW by replicating the basic module without a redesign. Each module uses hexagonal heliostat field to reflect sunlight to the salt-in-tube external thermal receiver on top of the tower at the center. With many modules working together, the receivers heat the 285 °C cold salt input and return 565 °C hot salt to centrally located storage. The hot salt will then be used in the generator system to generate electricity. The new system incorporates the experience from the Sierra SunTower which uses a Babcock & Wilcox's water-based receiver, and the finding from the Solar Two project.

== Partnerships ==
=== NRG ===
NRG Energy, Inc. partnered with eSolar in February 2009 to develop solar power plants with a total generation capacity of up to 500 MW at sites within California and across the Southwestern United States. Additionally, NRG invested approximately $10 million for equity and associated development rights for three projects and a portfolio of PPAs to develop, build, own, and operate up to 11 eSolar modular solar generating units at these sites. The development assets will use eSolar's concentrating solar power (CSP) technology to sell renewable electricity under contracted PPAs with local utilities seeking competitively priced, zero-carbon solar power.

=== Penglai Electric ===
In January 2010, eSolar announced a partnership with Penglai Electric, a privately owned Chinese electrical power equipment manufacturer, to build 2,000 MW of solar thermal power plants in China by 2021.

The deal represents China's largest CSP project to date (Spring 2010) and has a total potential capital investment of more than $5 billion. Under the master licensing agreement, Penglai Electric will use eSolar's solar thermal technology. The first plant of 92 MW will break ground in 2010. The plants will be co-located with biomass electricity generation facilities, together eliminating 15 million tons of carbon dioxide emissions annually.

It appears that this partnership is no longer progressing.

=== Ferrostaal ===
In February 2010, Ferrostaal, a global power and industrial plant developer, partnered with eSolar to deploy turnkey solar power plants in countries including Spain, the United Arab Emirates, and South Africa. Under the partnership, eSolar will provide solar field and receiver technology, while Ferrostaal will supply the power block, act as general contractor, and manage financing activities.

=== General Electric ===
In August 2011 General Electric (GE) made a strategic investment of up to $40 million in eSolar.

=== Aalborg CSP A/S ===
In December 2014, eSolar was awarded a commercial contract by Aalborg CSP to provide a solar collector system (SCS) solution for the Sundrop Farms Port Augusta expansion project. This expansion will increase the greenhouses by 20 hectares in support of a 10-year tomato supply contract with Coles.

== Recognition and awards ==
When eSolar's Sierra SunTower was unveiled in August 2009, California governor Arnold Schwarzenegger praised the company for, "...proving that California's energy and environmental leadership are advancing carbon-free, cost-effective energy that can be used around the world."

In December 2009, eSolar was honored by the World Economic Forum as a 2010 Technology Pioneer. The award recognizes eSolar's technological innovation and global commitment to delivering a clean, low-cost energy alternative to fossil fuels. An interview with Bill Gross is featured on YouTube where he responds to four questions posed to each of the World Economic Forum's Technology Pioneer 2010 winners.

In December 2009, editors of Power Engineering magazine selected Sierra SunTower as the winner of the "Best Renewable Project", recognizing the facility as an exceptional power generation project toward meeting growing global demand.

In February 2010, Sierra SunTower won Renewable Energy World's "Renewable Project of the Year" award. The award recognized eSolar's achievements in the clean energy industry by naming Sierra SunTower an exceptional breakthrough in the commercialization of solar thermal technology.

In February 2010, eSolar was named one of The Massachusetts Institute of Technology (MIT)'s Technology Review's 2010 TR50. The TR50 is a list of the 50 most innovative companies in the world, those that have demonstrated superiority at creating technology that transforms how we live. The 2010 TR50 celebrates the development of emerging technologies and the progress made in those already established. eSolar is honored alongside such companies as Google, Apple, Twitter, and IBM.

In March 2010, The Wall Street Journal's first survey of venture-backed clean technology companies featured eSolar as a Top 10 Cleantech Company with the capital, executive experience, and investor know-how to succeed in an increasingly crowded field.

== Investors ==
eSolar has secured over $182 million in investment funds. Investors include Google.org, Oak Investment Partners, NRG Energy, ACME Group, Idealab, and Quercus Trust.

== Management ==
- President & CEO – John Van Scoter
- Founder – Bill Gross

== See also ==
- List of concentrating solar thermal power companies
- List of solar thermal power stations
