= National Solar Thermal Test Facility =

Testing facility in New Mexico, US

Coordinates: 34.963889°N 106.509722°W

National Solar Thermal Test Facility (NSTTF)
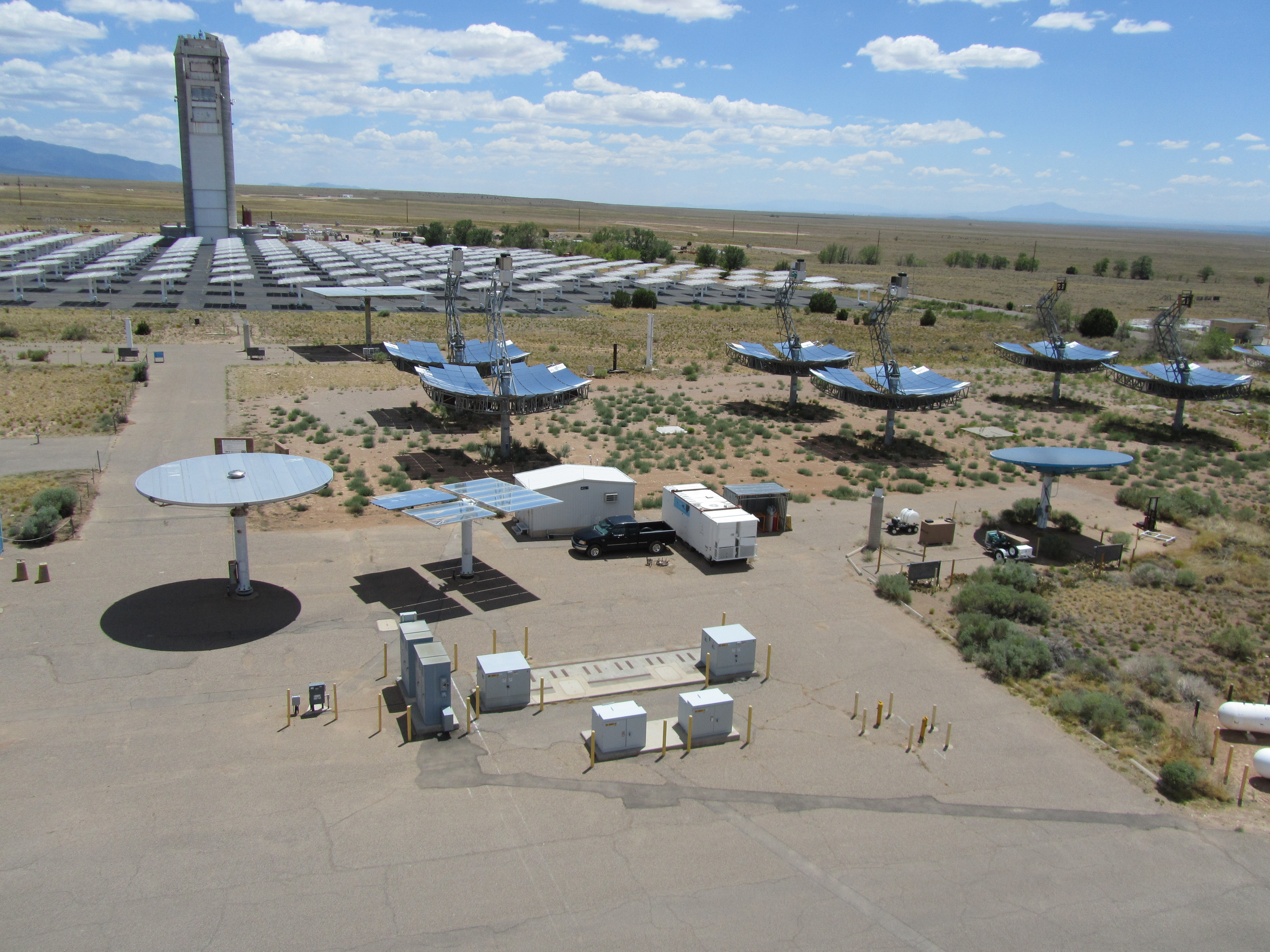
- Established: 1978
- Research type: Concentrating Solar Power
- DOE Office: Energy Efficiency & Renewable Energy
- Location: Albuquerque, NM
- Operating agency: Honeywell International and Sandia National Laboratories

Operated by Sandia National Laboratories for the U.S. Department of Energy (DOE), the National Solar Thermal Test Facility (NSTTF) is the only test facility of this type in the United States. The NSTTF’s primary goal is to provide experimental engineering data for the design, construction, and operation of unique components and systems in proposed solar thermal electrical plants planned for large-scale power generation.

The site was built and instrumented to provide test facilities for a variety of solar and non-solar applications. The facility can provide

- high heat flux and temperatures for materials testing or aerodynamic heating simulation
- large fields of optics for astronomical observations or satellite calibrations
- solar furnace
- rotating platform for parabolic trough evaluation.

== History ==
External images
- The test facility from the air
- The test facility from the ground
- The test facility from the ground

During the late 1970s, rising fuel costs and the demand for a cleaner environment gave impetus to advance technology which used solar energy to create electricity. Studies identified the central receiver concept as having high potential to generate electricity on a large scale. The United States government initiated support through the National Science Foundation Research Applied to National Needs (RANN) program in 1972 which was eventually funded by the Energy Research and Development Administration and the Department of Energy. Six central receiver pilot plants were constructed including the 5 MW (thermal) test facility at Sandia National Laboratories.

== Facility overview ==
=== Heliostat field ===
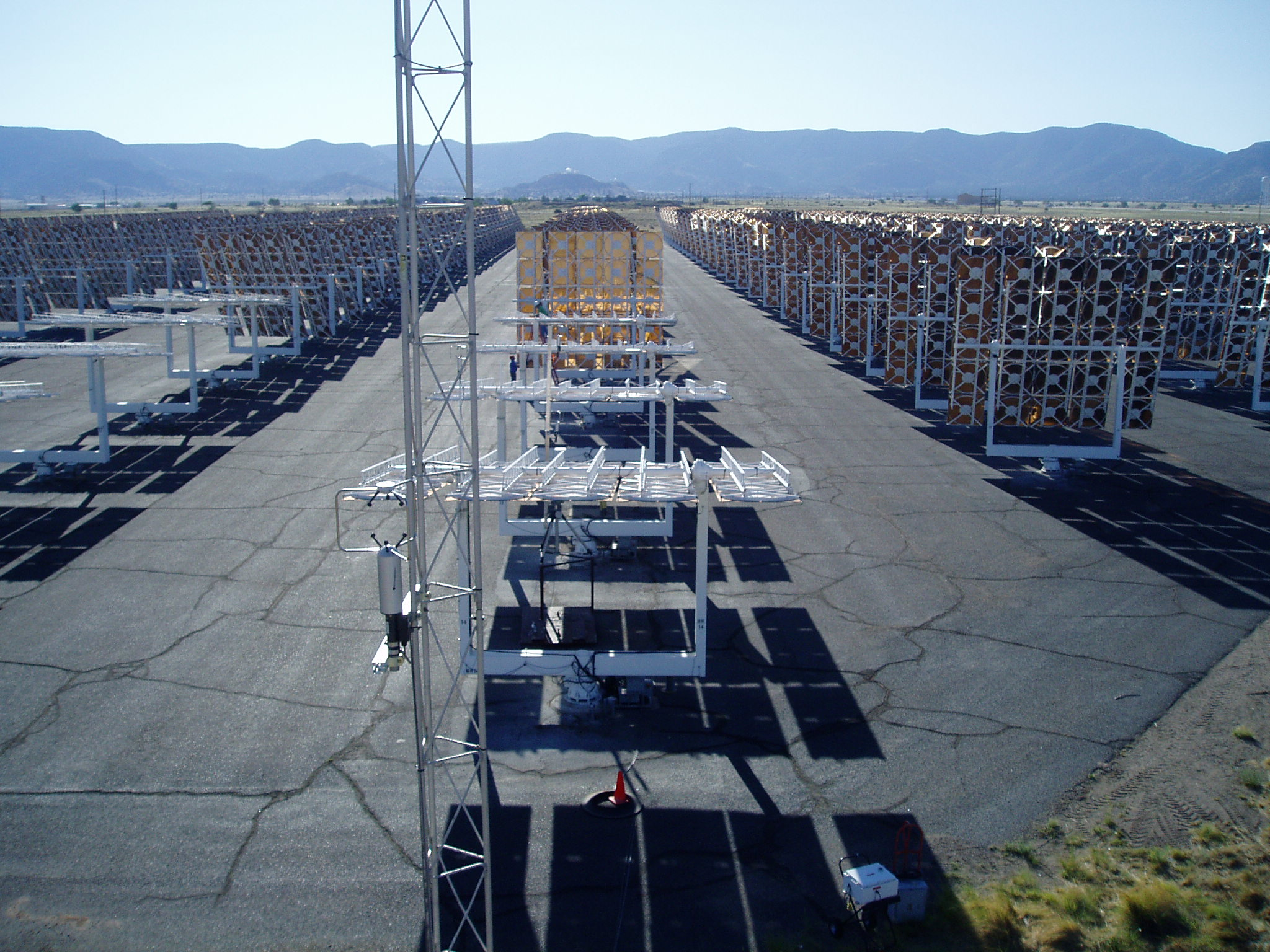
The heliostat field at Sandia National. Labs.

The heliostat field has 218 individual heliostats. This capability directly supports the SunShot goals by providing flux levels of greater than 250 W/cm^{2} and total power in excess of 6 MW. Each heliostat has two motors and two drives (one azimuth and one elevation), one 480 V power box, one electronics box, and one control box and associated cabling. The total reflective area on each heliostat is 37 m^{2}. The reflectivity on the recently replaced facets is 96%.

=== Solar tower ===
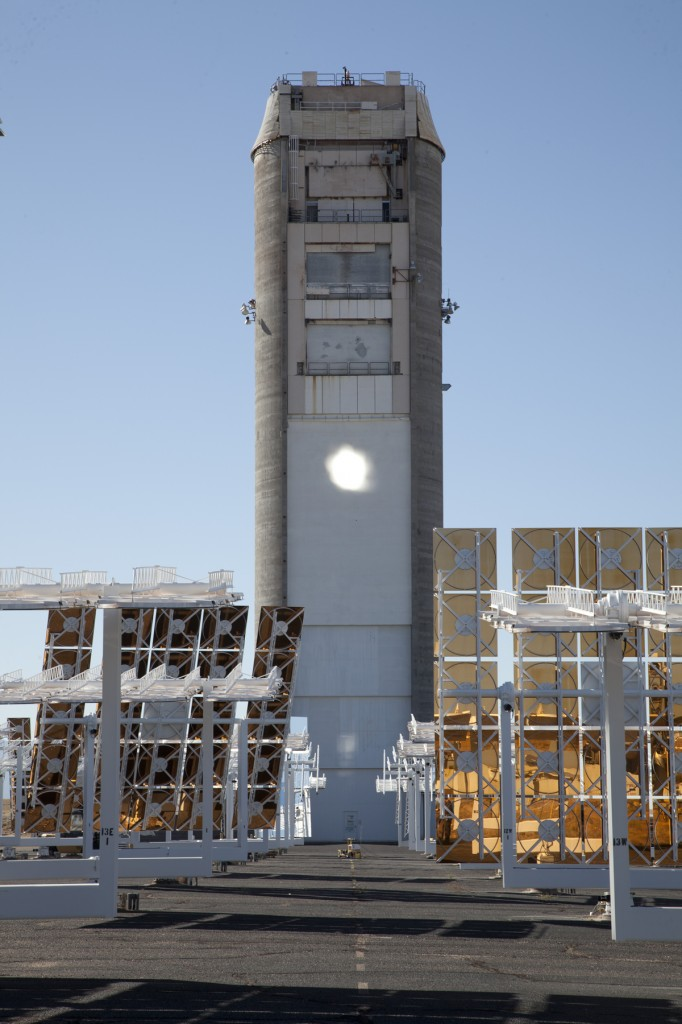
The solar power tower field at Sandia National. Labs.

The tower is a 61 m (200 ft) high concrete structure with three test locations on the north side and the top of the tower. The tower can support testing for CSP experiments and large-scale, high-flux materials samples. The equipment in the tower includes a 100-ton capacity elevating module for lifting experiments to the top of the tower, internal cranes for receiver fabrication, water glycol cooling systems and air coolers to provide heat removal from experiments, air compressors, control valves, generators, uninterruptible power supplies, piping systems, and pressure-relief valves.

=== Molten salt test loop ===
The molten salt test loop directly supports the SunShot goals by providing development for thermal energy storage costs ≤$15/kWhth and by allowing greater collection efficiencies and higher-temperature operation for linear Fresnel and trough systems through utilization of molten salt HTF. The facility also provides a means of performing accelerated lifetime testing on components, thus reducing the risk of the technology. Though operating below 600 °C, many of the lessons learned at this facility will be directly applicable to molten salt systems operating in the SunShot temperature range ≥ 650 °C.

=== Dish test facility ===
This area of the site allows industry partners to install full-scale solar dishes for long-term reliability testing and evaluation. There are currently ten dishes from Stirling Energy Systems and six Infinia dishes at this location. The site also includes two SNL-developed solar dishes that are available for research. Solar dishes can be used for the high-temperature portions of the SunShot goals.
