= Los Alcornocales Natural Park =

Protected area in Andalusia, Spain

- Parque natural de Los Alcornocales
- IUCN category V (protected landscape/seascape)
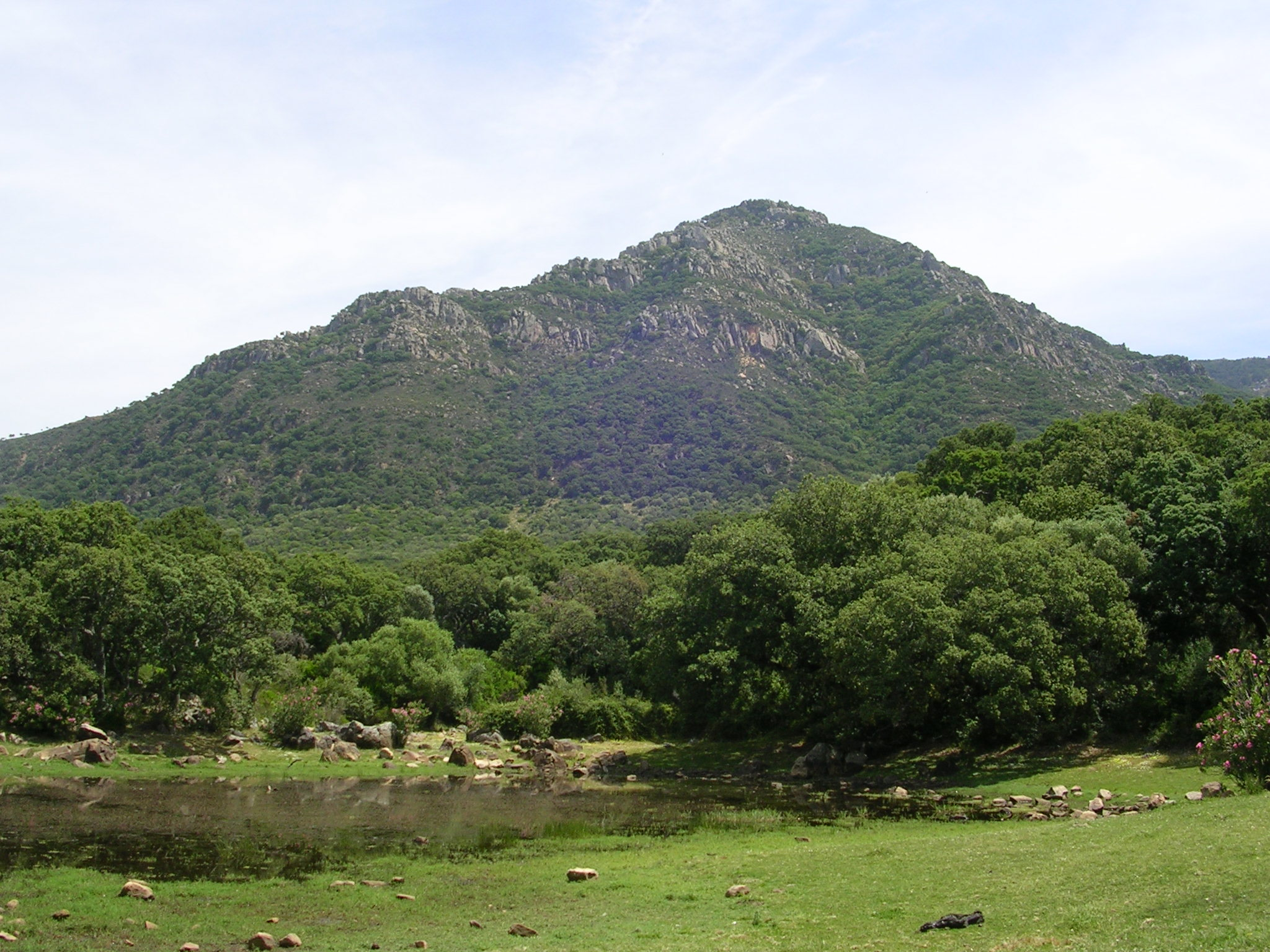
- El Picacho

- Location within Andalusia
- Location: Cádiz and Málaga provinces Andalusia, Spain
- Coordinates: 36°26′N 5°34′W
- Area: 1,677 km^{2} (647 sq mi)
- Established: 1989

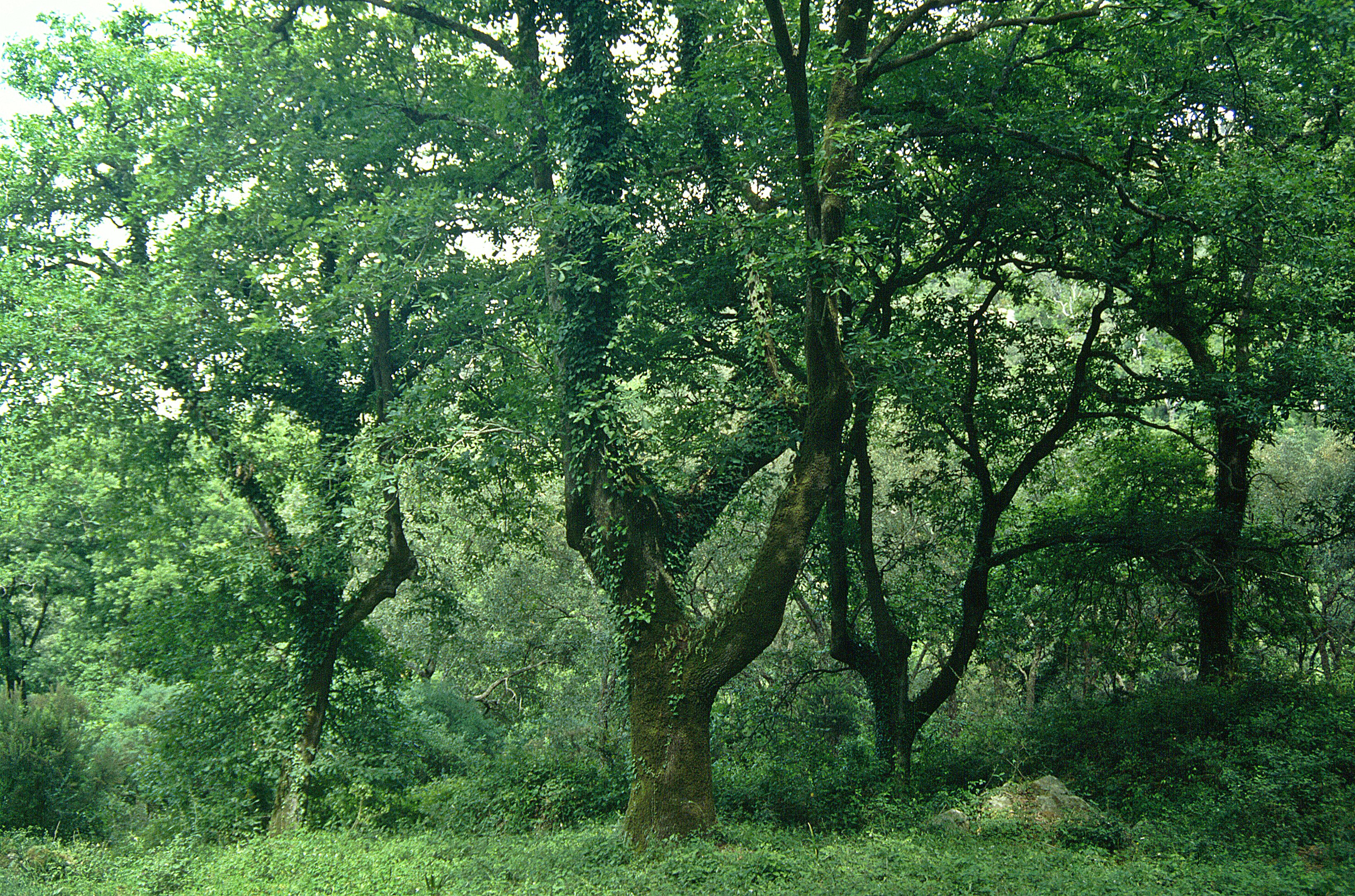
Cork oaks

Los Alcornocales Natural Park (in Spanish, Parque natural de Los Alcornocales) is a natural park located in the south of Spain, in the autonomous community of Andalusia; it is shared between the Province of Cádiz and Málaga. The natural park occupies a territory spanning seventeen municipalities with a total population of about 380,000. Los Alcornocales means "the cork oak groves".

Nearly all of the uninhabited land in the park is covered by Mediterranean native forest. While some of the land has been cleared for cattle ranches, much of the human activity in the park is devoted to exploitation of the forest's resources: hunting wild game, collecting wild mushrooms, and foraging for good specimens of tree heath. The tree heath (Erica arborea, called "brezos" in Spanish) is a small evergreen shrub, rarely more than two or three meters high; it is the source of the reddish briar-root wood used in making tobacco pipes, and its wood is excellent raw material for making charcoal.

Above all, however, the park's forests are exploited for the production of cork. The cork oak (Quercus suber) is a tree with a spongy layer of material lying between the outer surface of its bark and the underlying living layer called the phloem (which, in turn, encloses the non-living woody stem.) Cork is generated by a specialized layer of tissue called cork cambium. Properly done, harvesting cork from a given tree can be undertaken every ten to twelve years without damaging the tree; the cork cambium simply regenerates it. Cork has many commercial uses, including wine-bottle stoppers, bulletin boards, coasters, insulation, sealing material for jar lids, flooring, gaskets for engines, fishing bobbers, handles for fishing rods and tennis rackets, etc. Los Alcornocales Natural Park has the biggest and best preserved relicts of Laurisilva in Continental Europe.

Los Llanos del Juncal, a small part of the Natural Park, has a distinctive cloud forest and it also forms a mixed laurel forest, that dates back to somewhere between the Tertiary and the Quaternary Period.

== Climate ==
Given the geographic position of Los Alcornocales, the dominant climate in the zone is, logically, Mediterranean, but a series of factors contribute to its uniqueness, having an Oceanic Mediterranean climate in the southwest area of the natural park, which receives much more rain than a typical Spanish Mediterranean climate. Its close proximity to the Atlantic Ocean and the Mediterranean Sea helps keep the temperature relatively mild all year long. The average rainfall usually reaches over 800 L/m^{2}, with certain zones receiving more than 1,400 L/m^{2} thanks to the ocean front. In the mountain ranges to the south, there are great fogs known as the barbas del Levante (the beards of the east wind). These fogs provide the humidity to form precipitation during the long dry seasons that usually characterize Mediterranean climates. All of these factors contribute to create a unique humid microclimate that grows a vegetation that resembles more to the Macaronesian humid subtropical vegetation instead of the typical Mediterranean vegetation. The strong East wind is known as Viento de Levante, and is associated with high temperatures. The wind from the West, which frequently brings rain, is known as Viento de Poniente. These winds make this area one of the best places to construct wind farms in all of Spain.

== Flora ==
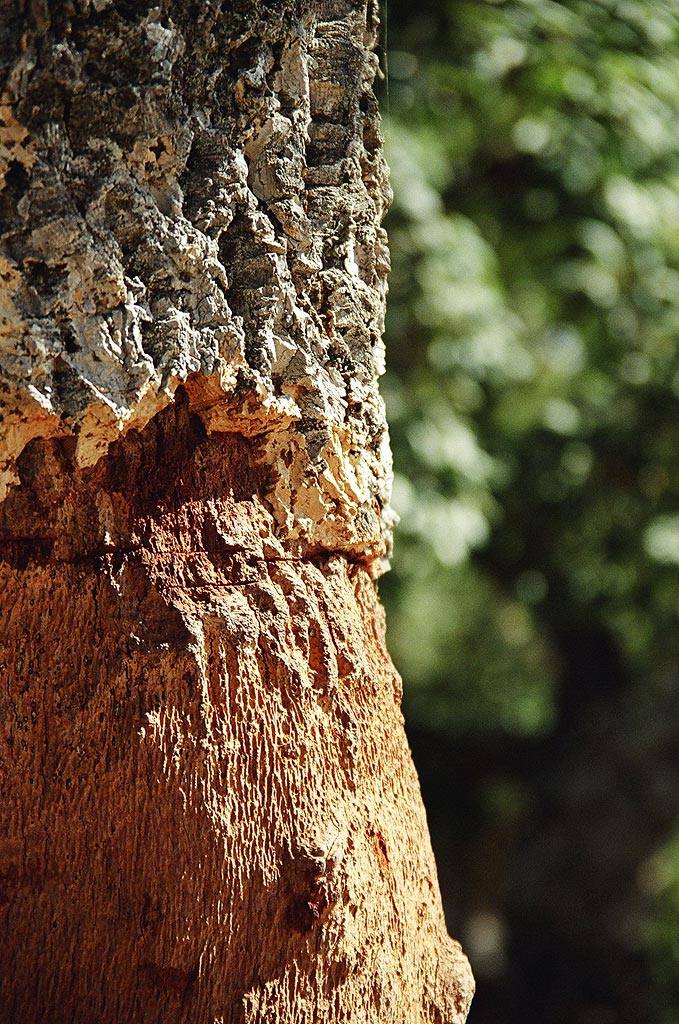
Trunk of a cork tree

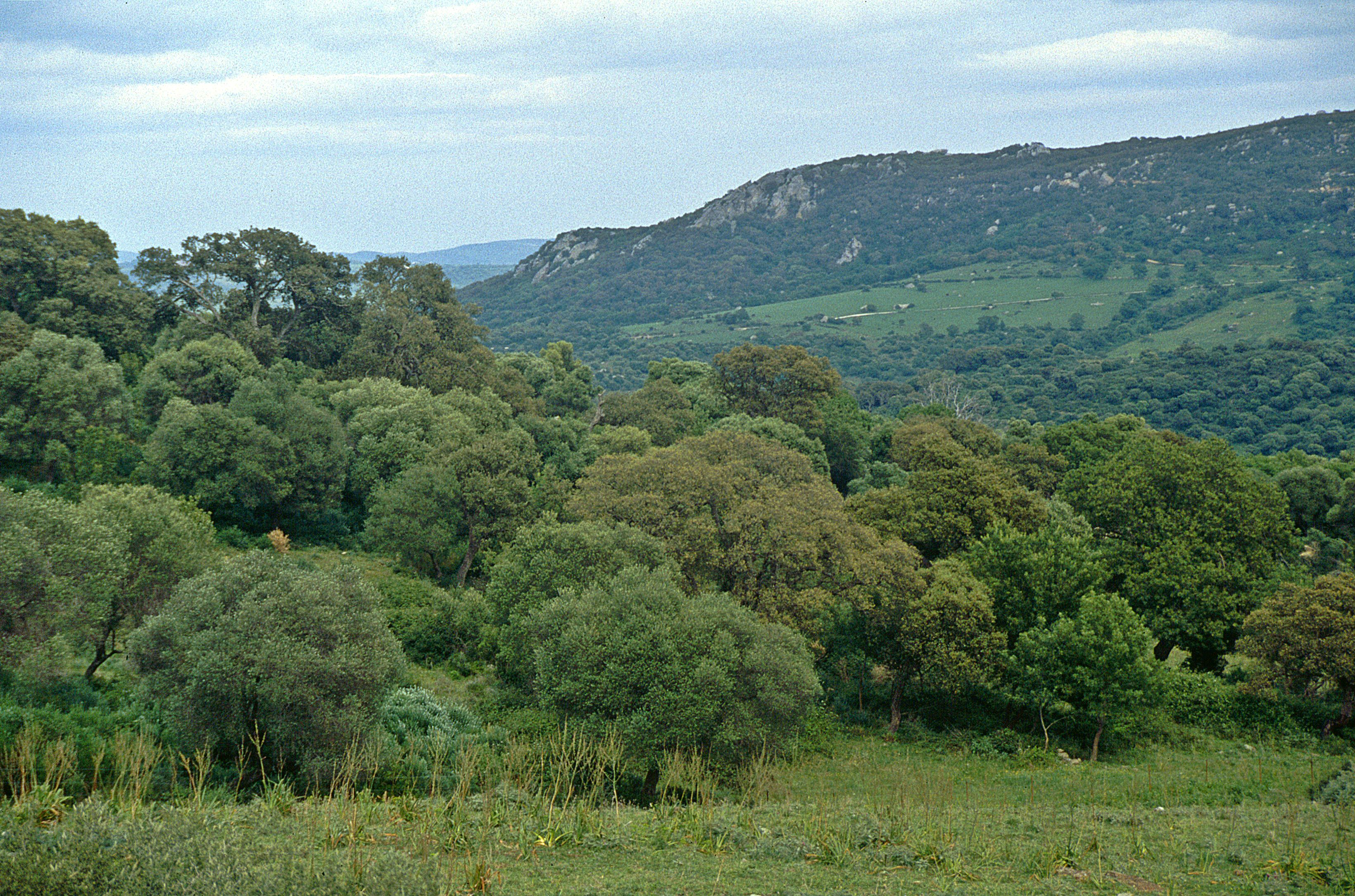
Cork oak tree forest

The park is characterized by the most extensive forest of cork in Spain and one of the largest in the world. In contrast to the mountains of cork in other latitudes where the tree density is low, in this zone the trees form an authentic forest with a rich variety of shrub and herbaceous vegetation intimately connected. This assures a natural regeneration of the forest, a good mix of ages, and a high level of floral and animal biodiversity.

Forests and smaller wooded areas within the park are comprised mainly by cork oaks (Quercus suber), Portuguese oaks (Quercus faginea), Pyrenean oaks (Quercus pyrenaica), olive trees (Olea europaea), alders (Alnus glutinosa), holly trees (Ilex aquifolium), bay laurels (Laurus nobilis), rhododendrons (Rhododendron ponticum), ferns, mosses, and lichens.

== Fauna ==
- Storks (white, Ciconia ciconia; black, Ciconia nigra)
- Kites (black-winged, Elanus caeruleus; red, Milvus milvus; black, Milvus migrans)
- Buzzards (Buteo buteo)
- Spanish imperial eagles (Aquila adalberti)
- Vultures (Eurasian black, Aegypius monachus; griffon, Gyps fulvus; Egyptian, Neophron percnopterus)
- Egyptian mongooses (Herpestes ichneumon)
- Common genets (Genetta genetta)
- European otters (Lutra lutra)
- European polecats (Mustela putorius)
- Wildcats (Felis silvestris)
- Weasels (Mustela nivalis)
- Iberian lynxes (Lynx pardina)
- Roe deer (Capreolus capreolus)
- Fallow deer (Dama dama)

== History ==
The cork oak groves of Los Alcornocales are situated in a strategic place. They sit astride two important axes, one an east–west axis, the other north–south. The land here has allegiances to both the Atlantic Ocean and the Mediterranean Sea; similarly, it forms the throat of a bridge between Europe and Africa, a bridge broken only by the narrow Strait of Gibraltar. Its geographic position is the circumstance, as much as its climate, topography, or suitability for agriculture, that has dictated its patrimony.

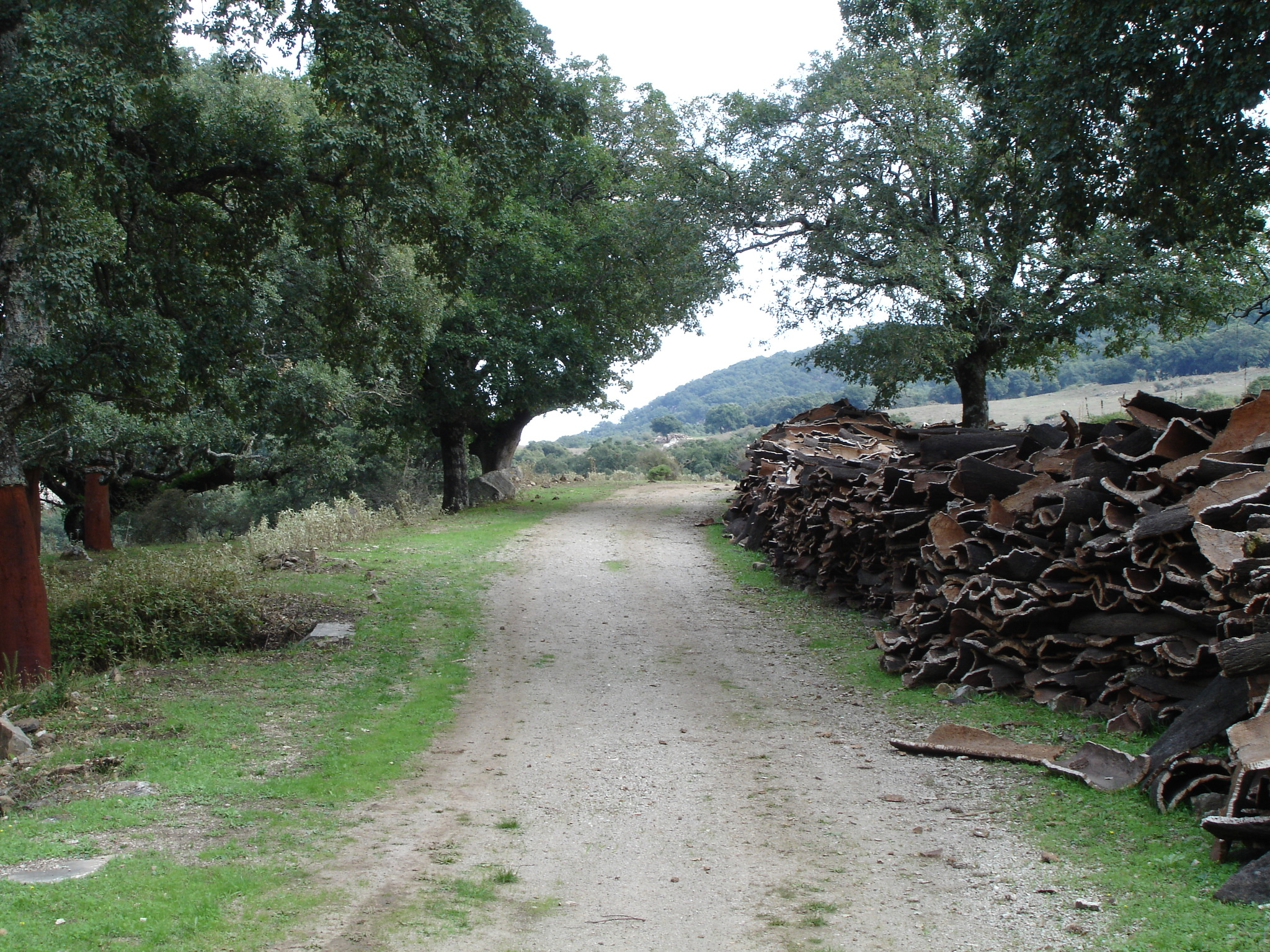
Cork collected from oaks

The area has been populated for tens of thousands of years. This is attested by the presence of archaeological remnants of settlements by Neanderthals dating back more than thirty thousand years, as well as stone implements, engravings, and cave paintings from both the Paleolithic and Neolithic ages. Of the greatest interest to visitors, however, are the Bronze Age cave dwellings that dot the area. Of more than fifty caves discovered so far, there are three that have special artistic value: the Cueva del Tajo de las Figuras (Cave of the Figures on the Precipice), which has been compared to the Sistine Chapel among examples of cave art; the Cave of the High Laja, that houses pictures of the earliest-known boats to ply the Mediterranean; and the Cave of Bacinete, with more than a hundred pictographic representations in a magnificent state of conservation.

Later in history, a succession of civilizations and cultures, one superimposed on the next, has dominated this area, all of whom have contributed to its ethnological character. Each has left its marks on the landscape; there are megalíthic monuments, Iberian, Phoenician, and Roman ruins, Arab strongholds, etc. Many of the towns that today comprise the park reached their highest state of civilization during the Muslim Nasrid dynasty, when this area was on the western fringe of the Kingdom of Granada. Today, in this area, many examples of the architecture introduced during the period of Muslim occupation survive; among them are the unique White Towns of Andalusia. Jimena de la Frontera, Castellar de la Frontera, San Roque, Cádiz, and Medina Sidonia are magnificent examples.

== Caves ==
The Cueva del Tajo de las Figuras, located near the town of Benalup-Casas Viejas, belongs to the group of Paleolithic and Neolithic sites in southern Spain that have examples of rock art that the Spanish call "art sureño" (southern art). In 1913, Juan Cabré and Eduardo Hernández-Pacheco began the first systematic studies of "art sureño" at this cave. The paintings are mostly representations of birds and odd four-footed man-like figures dating from Neolithic times.

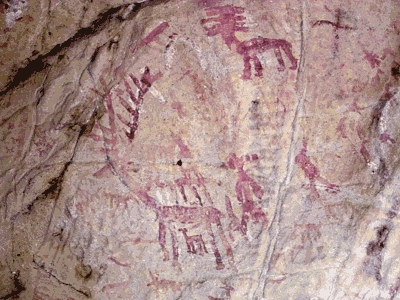
Cave painting of deer at Tajo de las Figuras

In 1924 the Cueva del Tajo de las Figuras was declared an Artistic Architectonic Monument by the Spanish state. For several decades, in order that visitors might better able to discern the paintings on the wall, tour guides have repeatedly sprayed water on them. This practice has resulted in the deposition of layers of lime on the paintings. Beginning in 2005, an effort to restore them was undertaken.

== The ecological disaster at La Janda ==
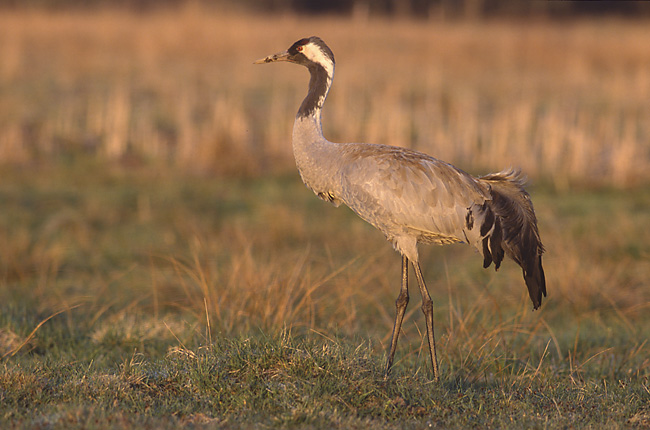
A Eurasian crane

Near the Cueva del Tajo de las Figuras was the ancient Laguna de la Janda, a haven where millions of birds, both resident and migratory species, found a suitable habitat for feeding and reproduction. Unfortunately, during the middle part of the twentieth century, this important ecological niche was destroyed. To support local rice-growing, water from the lagoon and its associated fresh-water wetlands was diverted, and the area dried up almost completely. In the process, the last reproductive Spanish population of the Eurasian crane (Grus grus) was lost as well.

== Towns and cities within the park ==
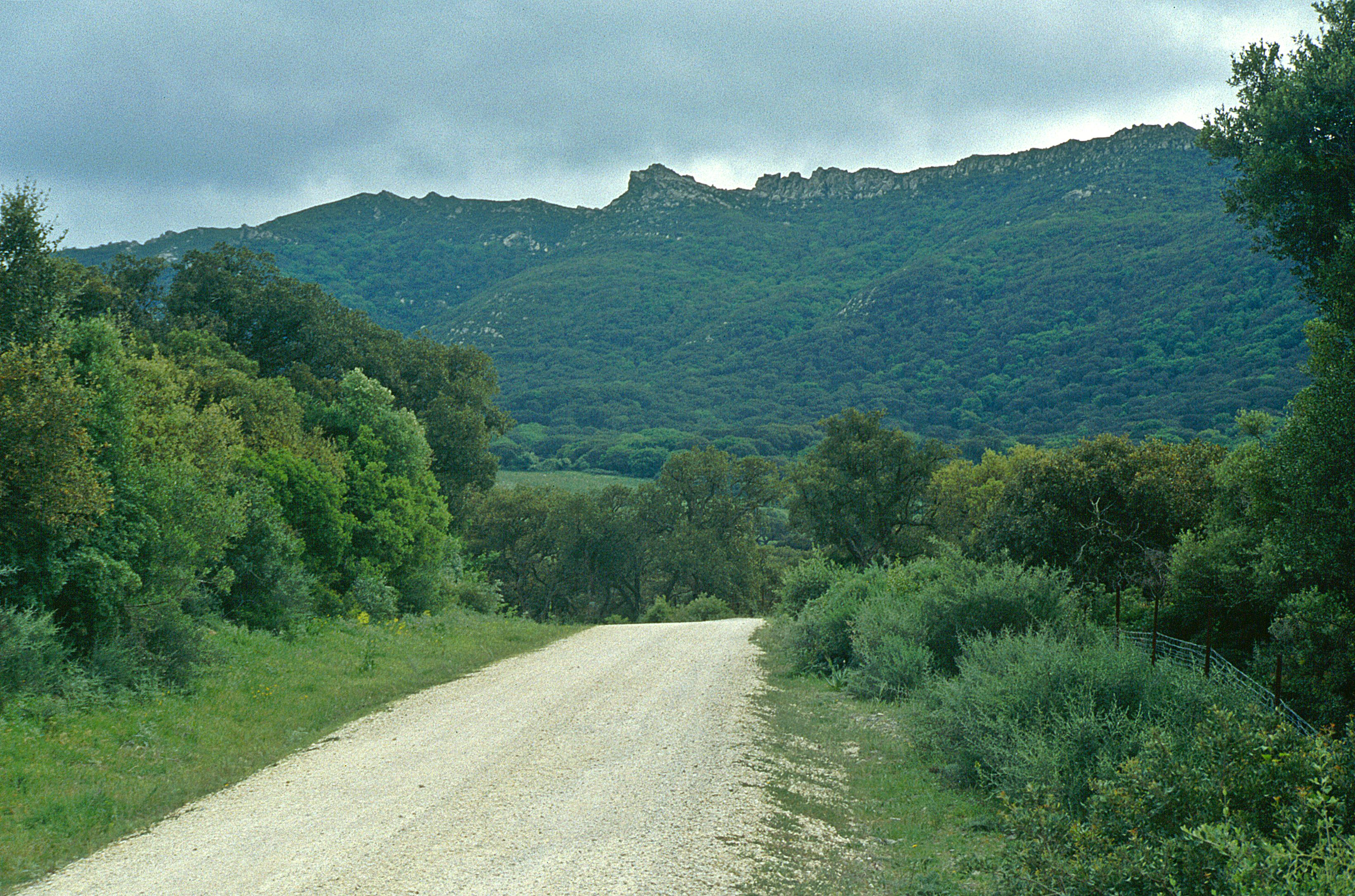
Path in the middle of the Natural Park

All or part of seventeen municipalities of the Province of Cádiz lie within the Natural Park of Los Alcornocales : Alcalá de los Gazules, Algar, Algeciras, Arcos de la Frontera, Benalup-Casas Viejas, Benaocaz, Castellar de la Frontera, El Bosque, Jerez de la Frontera, Jimena de la Frontera, Los Barrios, Medina-Sidonia, Prado del Rey, San José del Valle, San Roque, Cádiz, Tarifa and Ubrique. Likewise, there is one town in Málaga province, Cortes de la Frontera, that has land within park boundaries. Many paths connecting these municipalities, nowadays used for hiking.

== See also ==
- Cork as a commercial material
- Forests of the Iberian Peninsula
- List of Sites of Community Importance in Andalusia
- Intercontinental Biosphere Reserve of the Mediterranean

== Bibliography ==
- Acosta, Pillar: "The schematic cave painting in Spain", Faculty of Philosophy and Letters of the University of Salamanca, Salamanca, 1968
- Bergmann, Lothar: "Treatment of images: Applications in the investigation of Rock Art", COMPUTER, Magazine of computer science diffusion, Cadiz, 11/1996
- Breuil, H. and Burkitt, M.C. : "Rock Paintings of Southern Andalusia, a Description of the Neolithic and Copper Age Art Group", Oxford University Press, 1929
- Cabré, J., Hernandez - Pacheco, E.: "Introduction to the Study of Prehistoric Paintings of Southern Spain", Works of the Commission of Paleontological and Prehistoric Investigations, No.3, National Museum of Natural Sciences, Madrid, 1914
