= Valle Solar Power Station =

Two adjacent twin 50 MW solar thermal power plants

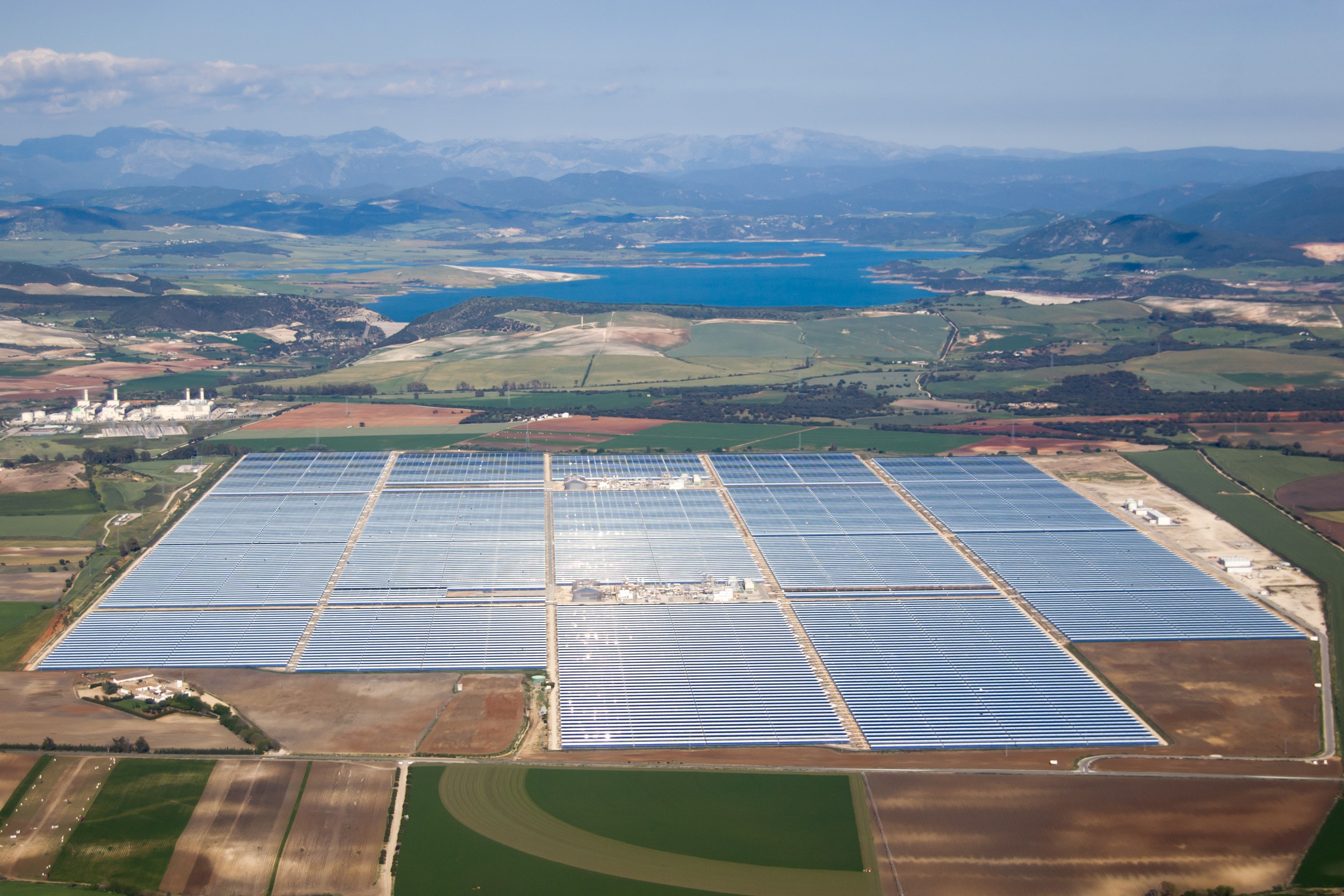
- Valle Solar Power Station (Valle 1 and Valle 2)
- Official name: Valle 1 y Valle 2 (Spanish)
- Country: Spain
- Location: near San José del Valle, Cádiz
- Coordinates: 36°40′N 5°50′W
- Status: Operational
- Construction began: December 2009
- Commission date: January 2012
- Construction cost: €540 million (US$700 M)
- Owner: Torresol Energy

Solar farm
- Type: CSP
- CSP technology: Parabolic trough
- Collectors: 2 × 624
- Site resource: 2,097 kWh/m^{2}/yr
- Site area: 4.6 km^{2} (2 sq mi)

Power generation
- Units operational: 2
- Nameplate capacity: 99.8 MW
- Capacity factor: 37%
- Annual net output: 340 GW·h
- Storage capacity: 749 MW·h_{e}

External links
- Website: www.torresolenergy.com/TORRESOL/valle1-valle2-plants/en

The Valle Solar Power Station is a two adjacent twin 50 MW solar thermal power plants (Arcosol-50, also Valle 1 and Termesol-50, also Valle 2, was Vallesol-2) in San José del Valle, Cádiz, Spain, near the border with the Arcos de la Frontera (north) and the Jerez de la Frontera (west) municipalities, in the comarca of the Campiña de Jerez (the Jerez countryside), a county with no administrative role.

The station generates power using parabolic trough technology. It became operational in January 2012. The Valle plant is owned by Torresol Energy, a joint venture between SENER (60%) and the Abu Dhabi Future Energy Company (40%). It was built by SENER between December 2009 and December 2011, at a cost of €540 million (US$700 million).

Construction on Valle 1 and Valle 2 began in December 2009 and was completed in December 2011. Roughly 4,500 workers dedicated over 2.7 million labor hours over the two years of construction until the plants were commissioned and connected to the Spanish national grid. Each 50 MW_{e} has the capacity to supply 160 Gwh of safe, clean power per year, to supply 40,000 homes. Together they reduce CO_{2} emissions by 90,000 tons every year. Their molten salt storage system allows them to continue producing electricity even without solar radiation. In addition to providing a manageable source of clean power, they can also supply electricity to the power grid based on demand.

The power station consists of two adjacent plants, Valle 1 and Valle 2. Each one has a nameplate capacity of 50 MW, using SENER parabolic trough collectors creating solar fields of 510,120 square metres on a total surface area of 460 hectares (1,100 acres). Net electrical output for each section is expected to be 160 gigawatt-hours (GW·h) per year. Each plant will have a molten salt thermal storage system containing 28,500 tons of molten salt (60% sodium nitrate / 40% potassium nitrate), capable of storing enough heat to generate 750 MWh of electricity — enough to operate at full power for 7.5 hours without sunshine.

Valle 1 and Valle 2 use SENERtrough parabolic trough collector technology, which concentrates solar radiation into a central collector tube with circulating thermal oil. They also have high precision optical sensors which track the sun from east to west. The hot oil is used to vaporize water, which through expansion in a steam turbine, propels a power generator that sends power to the electrical grid.

== See also ==
- List of solar thermal power stations
