= Campiña de Jerez =

Coordinates: 36°39′44″N 6°07′50″W

- Comarca
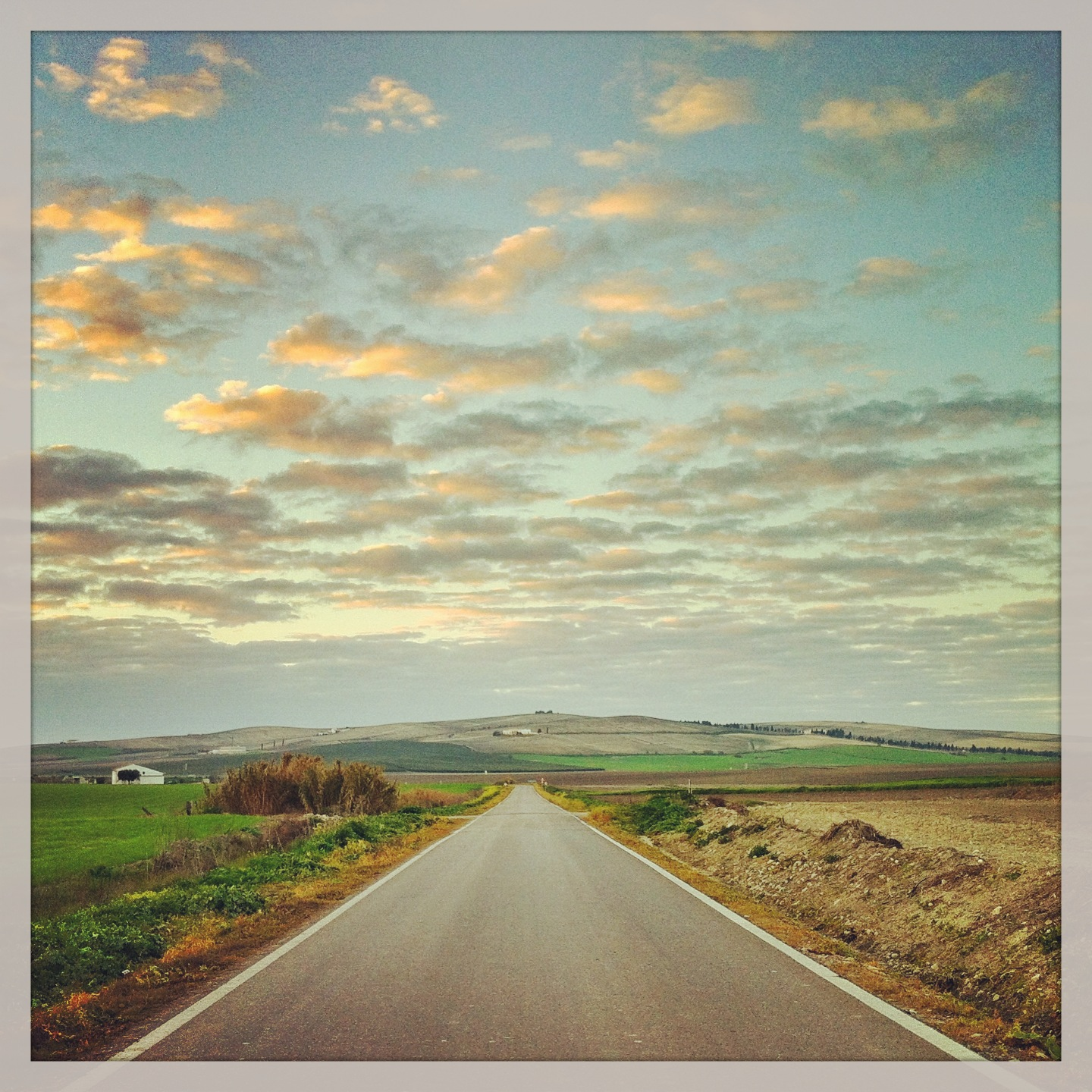
- Campiña de Jerez

- Location of Campiña de Jerez in Andalusia, Spain

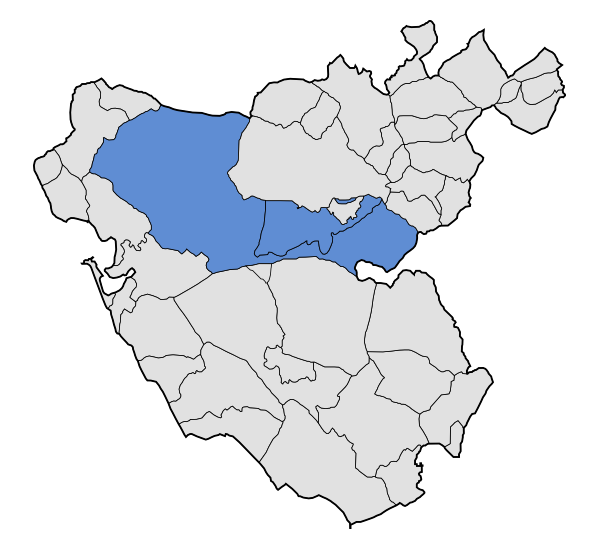
- Location of Campiña de Jerez in the province of Cádiz
- Country: Spain
- Autonomous community: Andalusia
- Province: Cádiz
- Municipalities: List: Jerez de la Frontera, San José del Valle

Area
  - Total: 1,412 km^{2} (545 sq mi)

Population (2023) (Note: Estimate at 1 January 2023: National Statistics Institute (Spain).)
  - Total: 217,717
  - Density: 154.2/km^{2} (399.4/sq mi)
- Time zone: UTC+1 (CET)
  - Summer (DST): UTC+2 (CEST)

Campiña de Jerez (the Jerez countryside) is one of the six comarcas (county, but with no administrative role) in the province of Cádiz, southern Spain.

The present-day comarca was established in 2003 by the Government of Andalusia.

== Municipalities ==
The Campiña de Jerez comarca consists of the municipalities of Jerez de la Frontera and San José del Valle.

Arms	Municipality	Area (km^{2})	Population (2023) (Note: Estimate at 1 January 2023: National Statistics Institute (Spain).)	Density (/km^{2})
	Jerez de la Frontera	1,188.23	213,231	179.45
	San José del Valle	224.01	4,486	20.03
	Total	1,412.24	217,717	199.48

== Economy ==
Together with the comarcas Bahía de Cádiz and Costa Noroeste, Campiña de Jerez form the Sherry Triangle, a region of sherry wine production. It is an important economic asset for the region, with a long tradition of British-Spanish winemaking families who export it to the United Kingdom and other european countries.

== Gallery ==
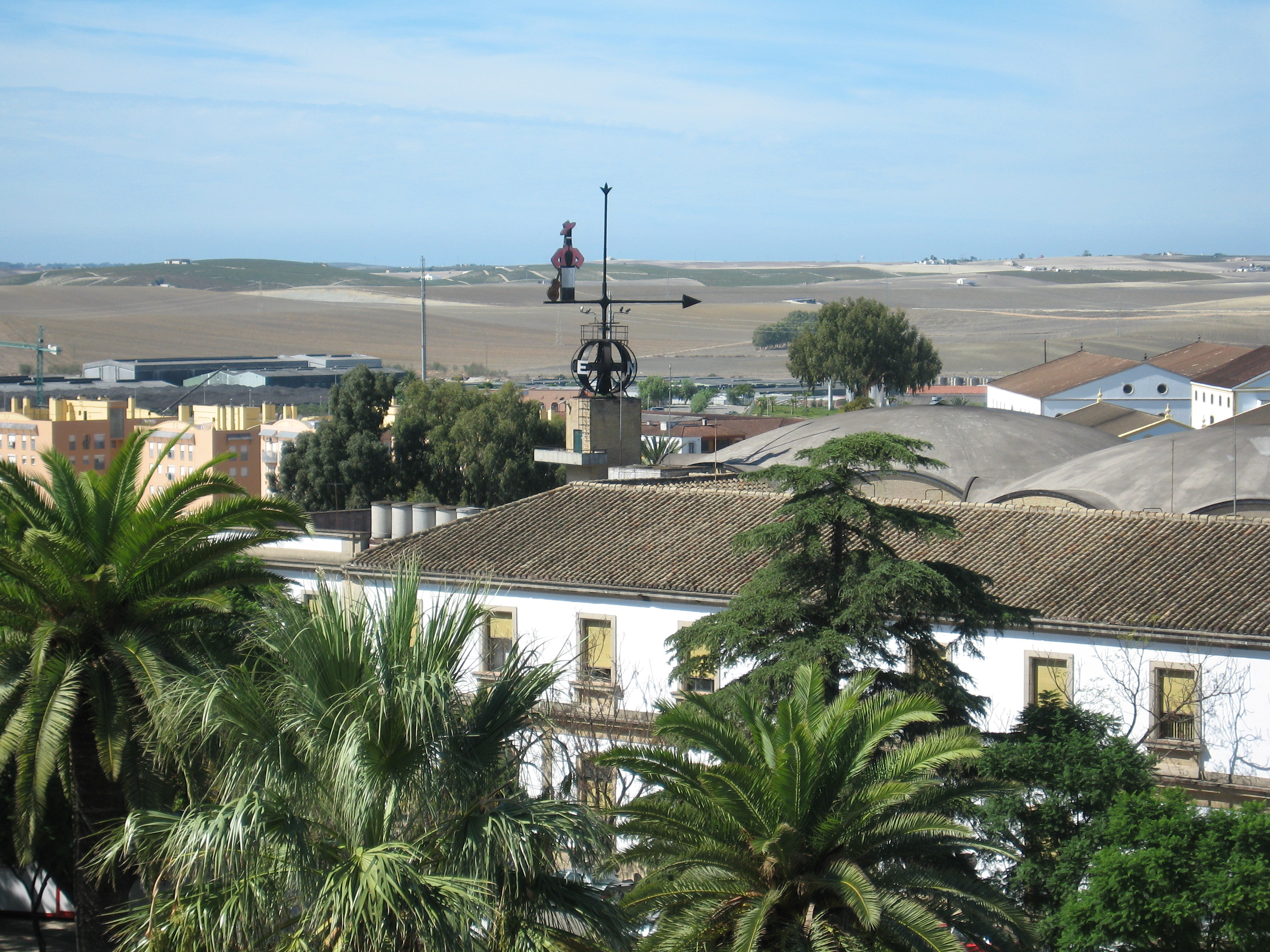
View of countryside from Jerez de la Frontera

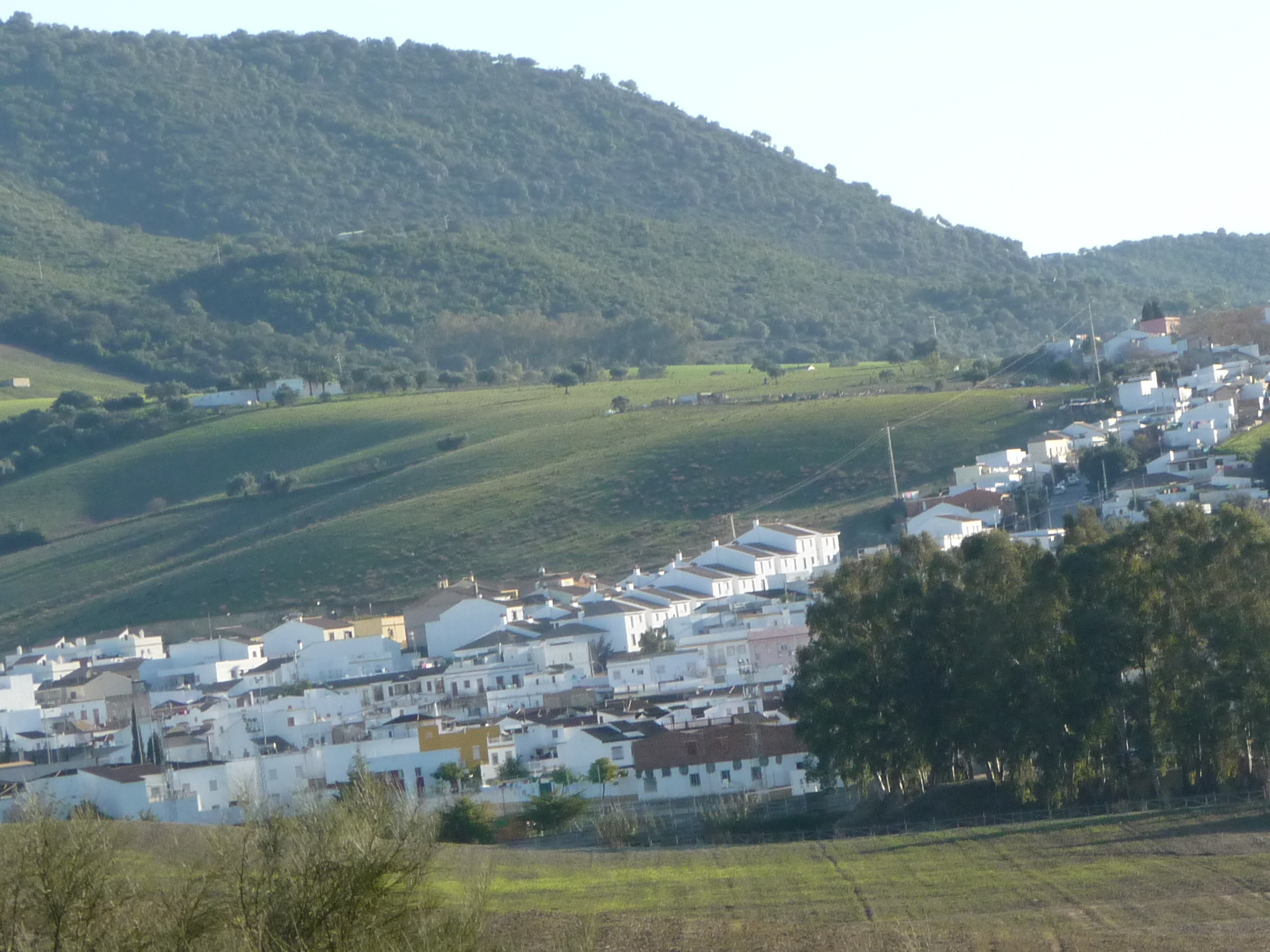
San José del Valle vista

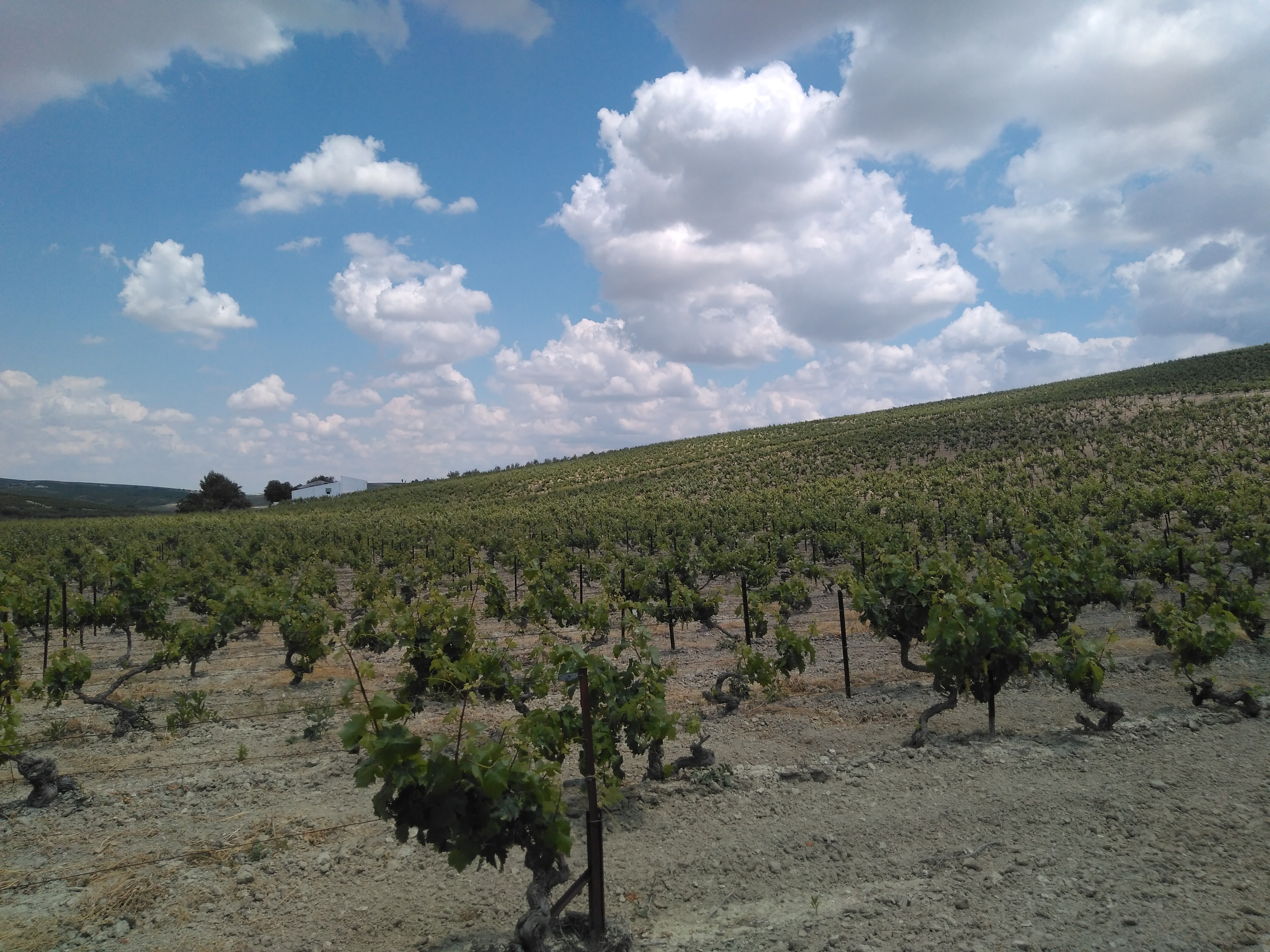
Vineyards

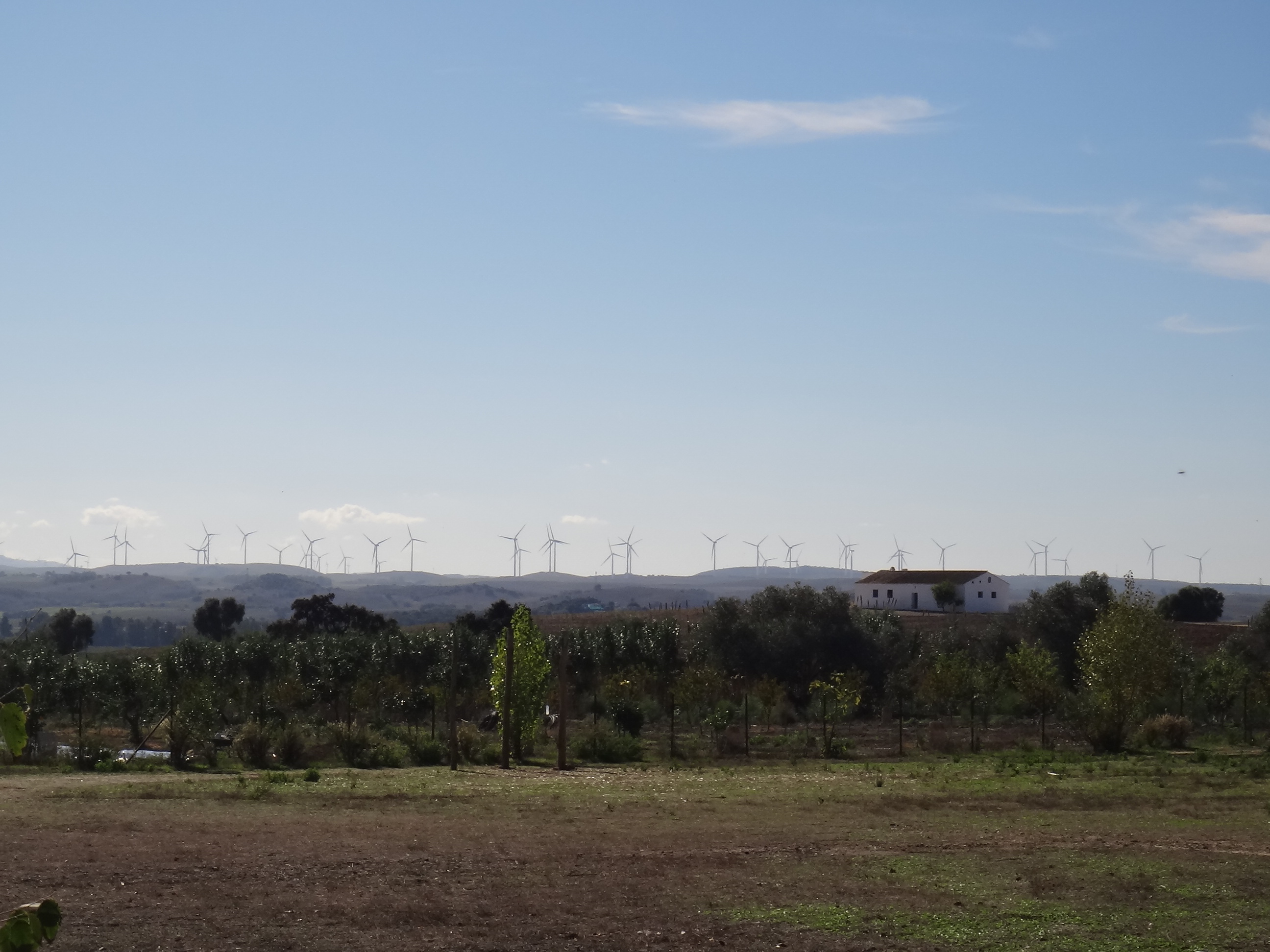
Wind turbines
