= Torresol Energy =

Spanish renewable energy company

Torresol Energy Investments
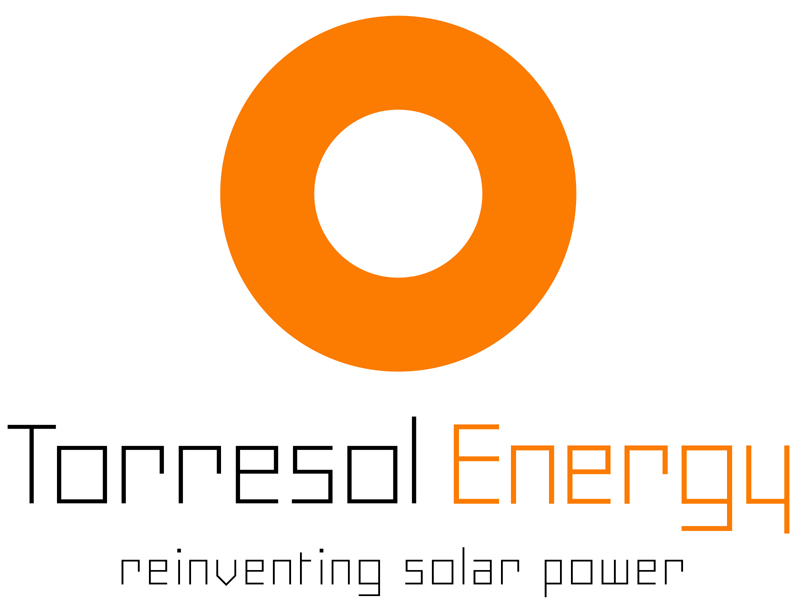
- Company type: Sociedad Anónima
- Industry: Renewable and alternative energies
- Founded: 2008
- Founder: SENER and Masdar
- Headquarters: Getxo, Biscay Province (Vizcaya), Basque Country, Spain
- Area served: Southern Europe, North Africa, Middle East, and the Southwestern United States.
- Products: Concentrated solar power plants.
- Services: Development of technology, construction, operation, and maintenance for concentrated solar power plants.
- Website: www.torresolenergy.com

Torresol Energy is a company dedicated to developing renewable energy and alternative energies, focusing on concentrated solar energy. It is based in the city of Getxo in Biscay Province (Vizcaya), in the Basque Country of northern Spain.

The company's goal is the technological development, construction, operation and maintenance of concentrated solar power plants.

== History ==
Torresol Energy began to take shape in 2007, when SENER Grupo de Ingeniería decided to promote its own thermosolar plants. To do this, it joined forces with Masdar, the renewable energy company of the Government of Abu Dhabi. In 2008 Torresol Energy was founded, controlled by SENER Grupo de Ingeniería (60%) and Masdar (40%). The company focuses its efforts on southern Europe, northern Africa, the Mideast, the southwestern United States and South America. In 2011 it launched the Gemasolar plant into commercial operation in Fuentes de Andalucía, Seville - the first solar power plant with central tower receiver technology and a molten salt storage system; and in 2012 it commissioned two more thermosolar plants with parabolic trough technology (CCP): Valle 1 and Valle 2 in San José del Valle, Cádiz.

== The plants ==
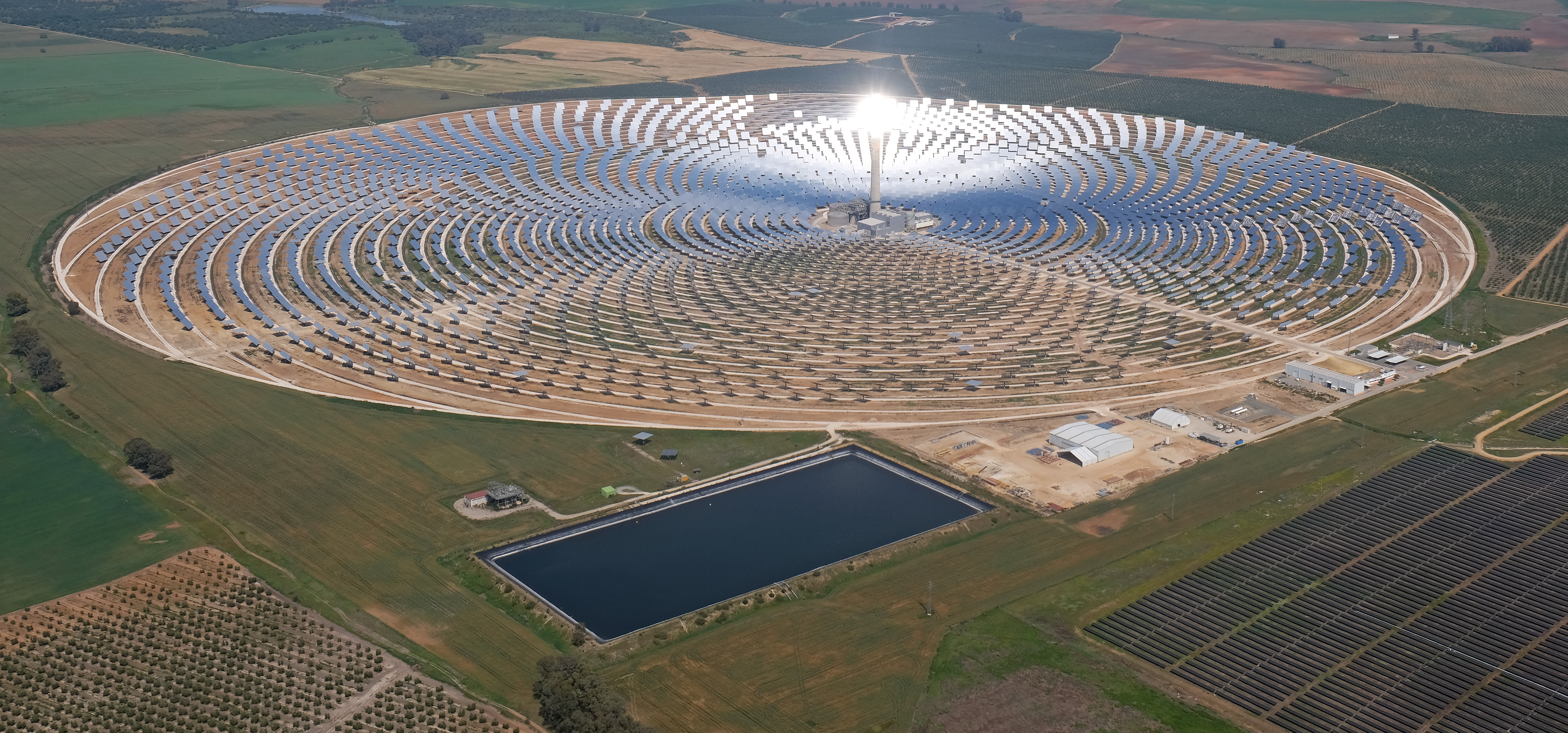
Gemasolar

Gemasolar is the first commercial solar plant in the world with a central tower receiver and molten salt heat storage technology. It has a 19.9 MW power generating capacity, which translates into an expected net production of 110 GWh/year and a 15-hour storage capacity in the absence of solar radiation. The plant consists of a 185 ha solar field with a 140 m high tower receiver, a power island and 2650 heliostats, each 120 m^{2} and distributed in concentric rings around the tower. The facility is located in Fuentes de Andalucía in Seville, Spain. The inclusion of the molten salt heat storage system allows the plant to produce electricity even when there is no solar radiation. The heat collected by the salts (which can reach temperatures over 500 °C), acts to generate steam which in turn is used to produce electric power. The excess heat accumulated during sunlight hours is stored in the molten salt tank, endowing the plant with the ability to produce electric power 24 hours a day in some months.

In January 2012, Valle 1 and Valle 2 were launched in San José del Valle (province of Cádiz, Spain): two adjacent plants that generate power using parabolic trough technology. Each of these plants has a 50 MW generation capacity, with an expected net power production of 160 GWh/year. The plants are located on a 510,000 m^{2} solar field equipped with SENERtrough® parabolic troughs. Each has a heat storage system with 7.5 hours of capacity. SENERtrough® parabolic troughs concentrate solar radiation into a central collector tube with thermal oil circulating in it, and they have high precision optical sensors which track the sun from east to west. The hot oil is used to heat water, which, through expansion in a steam turbine, propels a power generator which sends power to the electrical grid.

== See also ==
- Concentrating solar power
- Solar power in Spain
- Solar thermal energy
