= SENER =

Spanish construction and engineering company

SENER Engineering and Construction
- Industry: Engineering & Construction
- Founded: 1956
- Founder: Enrique de Sendagorta
- Headquarters: Getxo, Basque Country, Spain
- Number of locations: Facilities in 11 countries
- Area served: Worldwide
- Key people: Jorge Sendagorta, president
- Revenue: ▲€1,159 million (2011 figures)
- Net income: ▲€107.5 gures
- Number of employees: +2,000
- Website: www.group.sener

SENER is a private engineering and technology group founded in 1956. Specializing in activities related to Engineering and Construction, it has industrial holdings in companies working in the areas of energy, environment, and aeronautics.

== SENER Ingeniería y Sistemas ==
The Engineering and Construction area, called SENER Ingeniería y Sistemas, has a turnover of more than 653 million euros (2011 figures), about 2,200 employees and branch offices in Algeria, Argentina, Brazil, Chile, Colombia, Mexico, Morocco, Portugal, South Korea, Spain, United Arab Emirates, United Kingdom, United States, and India. The company develops projects in the sectors of Aerospace, Civil, Architecture, Power and Process and Marine Engineering.

== Aerospace Engineering ==
Since 1967, SENER has supplied equipment, systems integration and engineering services to international markets in the fields of Space, Aeronautics, Vehicles and Defense.
In the space field, the company develops components and systems for the flight segment in its three areas of activity: precision mechanisms, guidance, navigation and control (GNC) systems and, optical payloads. As far as precision mechanisms are concerned, SENER carries out projects such as providing the entire antenna system used in the Solar Orbiter mission and the medium and high-gain antennas for the BepiColombo satellites. In optical payloads, it has developed systems such as the UV camera for the World Space Observatory satellite. Regarding guidance, navigation and control (GNC) systems, mention should be made of projects such as the Altitude and Orbit Control System (AOCS) for the Herschel and Plank scientific satellites or the project as prime contractor for the PROBA-3 dual space probe mission. This activity is complemented by projects carried out by NTE-SENER, a company owned by SENER, specializing – as far as the Space sector is concerned - in developing life support projects, such as the European Space Agency's MARES or MELISSA programs.
In Aeronautics and Vehicles, the company delivers detailed designs for automotive vehicles as well as complex tooling facilities for aeronautical production lines. In this field, it has delivered turn-key production systems for wing stringer production and HTP assembly for the A350XWB. Regarding part production, SENER delivers turn-key equipment such as hot forming systems and pultrusion machines for wing spar production.
In the Defense field, SENER's main area of activity is that of missiles: missile subsystems, actuation and control and SAL-guided systems. Furthermore, the company can provide complete systems. Among its projects, we can mention the supply of Taurus missiles for the Spanish Air Force as the main contractor or the participation in the IRIS-T and Meteor programs. SENER is also leading the project for the development of the future air defense system for the Spanish Army and Air Force, entitled Sagitario.

In 2019, SENER and CATEC completed the delivery of the telemetry and telecom, and antennas for the European Agency's PROBA-3 mission, for which SENER Aerospacial is the prime contractor. This group of antennas for the PROBA-3 mission includes the first one made by SENER Aerospacial using metal 3D printing.

== Power and Process ==
SENER develops processing and electricity generating plants, especially combined-cycle, co-generation and solar thermal power plants (the company has participated in projects involving 26 plants in India, Spain and the USA, outstanding among which are Gemasolar, Valle 1 and Valle 2); nuclear power plants, liquefied natural gas regasification plants (as the Gate terminal in the Netherlands or the SAGGAS terminals), biofuels, refinery units, chemicals, petrochemicals and plastics plants, developing also transportation, storage and distribution systems for solid, liquid, and gaseous fuels.

== Civil and Architecture ==
In this sector, SENER develops complete engineering projects for railroad infrastructure (International High Speed Line Figueras-Perpignan), high speed lines (sections of the high-speed lines Madrid-Valencia and Madrid-Barcelona), metros and Light Rail Systems, LRS (as lines 1, 2 and 4 of the Bilbao Metro, line 9 of the Barcelona metro or the light rail in Porto), roads and highways (developing technical standards for the ITS-Intelligent Transport Systems in Mexico), airports (Lublin Airport, preparation of the Master Plan of Mexico City Airport, etc.), ports (such as dredging projects in ports of Catalonia 2009–2012), marine works, hydraulic engineering, environmental projects, architecture and urbanism (reconstruction of Kraków football stadium, Bilbao exhibition centre or Valencia Airport Parking).

== Marine ==
SENER has always retained its original marine vocation, and it is in this area that the company is specially acclaimed for its FORAN System. FORAN is a CAD/CAM system for the design, production and manufacture of ships. The system comprises several application packages, a number of common modules (build strategy, 2D drafting, 3D walk-through design review, concurrent engineering), links with production equipment, interfaces to management systems and even its own integrated development environment. The system runs on Windows workstations connected through LAN or WAN, permitting a fully interactive and concurrent definition of the ship 3D product model. The most recent design information is saved in an Oracle database providing designers with a wide range of complementary disciplines. When designing each ship part or each sub-assembly, it allows to define production processes in parallel mode, thus enabling the generation (for the most part, automatic) of custom-made, accurate and well-organized production information. The company also undertakes engineering projects for ship design and engineering, such as the repair and modernization of the Argentinian Navy's icebreaker "Almirante Irizar" or the Viking Line Ferry at Seville Shipyard.

== SENER Grupo de Ingeniería ==
SENER Grupo de Ingeniería - the matrix company - promotes and takes part in manufacturing and production businesses. Through its Aeronautics area, it is present in consortium, such as Industria de Turbopropulsores ITP (sole Spanish industrial company producing aeronautical engines and gas turbines, started by SENER in 1984). Furthermore, through its Energy and Environment area, SENER has promoted different projects – in which it also holds stock options and contributes with its own technology – in the fields of renewable energies and waste energy valorization such as Torresol Energy. The performance of all companies comprising the Energy and Environment area is based on technology and processes developed within the Group. A company highlight in 2011 was the commercial operation start of the Gemasolar thermosolar plant, owned by Torresol Energy, which has a rated power of 19.9 MW.

== SENER Foundation ==
In 2002 SENER established the SENER Foundation having as a goal to support the training and work of people or groups from Spain or other countries that stand out for their scientific or technological competence, thus contributing to the progress of society. In support of young newly graduated engineers, the Foundation awards scholarships for postgraduate studies that are followed by an employment internship at SENER, which is a way to facilitate the integration of these professionals in technology projects.
