= CACTUS =

- Organization: University of California, Davis
- Location: Daggett, California, US
- Coordinates: 34.87187°N 116.83419°W
- Altitude: 610 metres (2,000 ft)
- Established: 2001-2004
- Closed: 2005

Telescopes
- Solar 2 ACT: Čerenkov air shower

CACTUS (Converted Atmospheric Cherenkov Telescope Using Solar-2) was a ground-based, Air Cherenkov Telescope (ACT) located outside Daggett, California, near Barstow. It was originally a solar power plant called Solar Two, but was converted to an observatory starting in 2001. The first astronomical observations started in the fall of 2004. However, the facility had its last observing runs in November 2005 as funds for observational operations from the National Science Foundation were no longer available. The facility was operated by the University of California, Davis but owned by Southern California Edison. It was demolished in 2009.

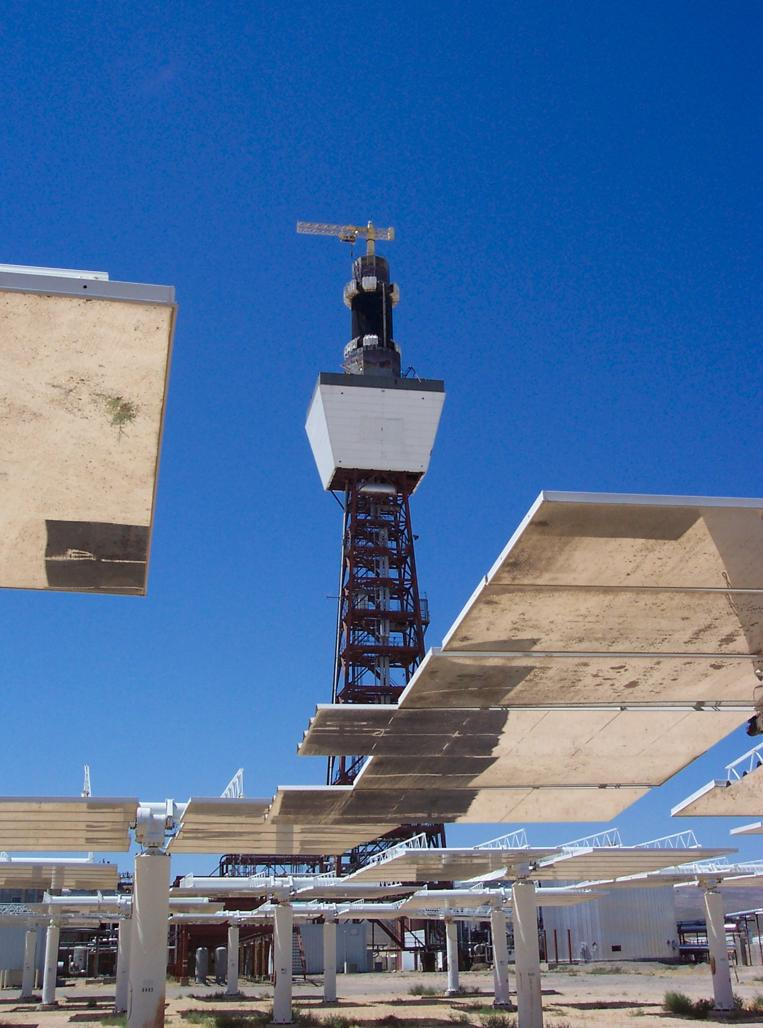
The central observation tower of the CACTUS observatory

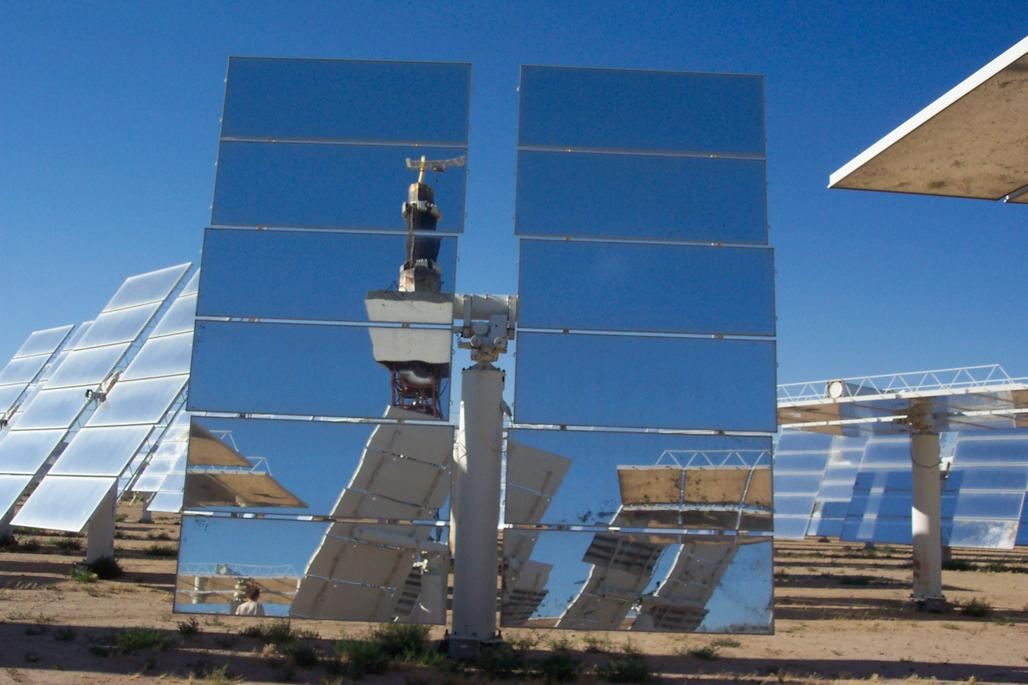
The main CACTUS observatory tower, as reflected in mirrors.

== See also ==
- Air shower (physics)
- Čerenkov radiation
- Gamma-ray astronomy - provides some history of high energy astronomy.
- IACT
- The Solar Project - the physical facility that preceded C.A.C.T.U.S. in Daggett.
- STACEE
- Ultra-high-energy cosmic ray
