= Cave of Bacinete =

Cave and archaeological site in Spain

- Cueva de Bacinete (Spanish)
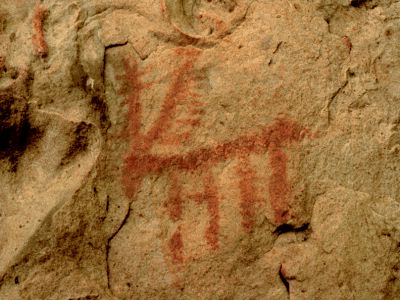

- Location within Spain
- 36.197997°N 5.556817°W
- Location: Los Barrios, Spain

Spanish Cultural Heritage
- Official name: Cave of Bacinete
- Type: Non-movable
- Criteria: Monument
- Designated: 1985
- Reference no.: RI-51-0011420

The Cave of Bacinete (Spanish: Cueva de Bacinete) is a cave located in Los Alcornocales Natural Park, Los Barrios, province of Andalusia, south Spain. It contains examples of prehistoric rock art and was declared Property of cultural interest in 1985.
