= Gemasolar Thermosolar Plant =

Concentrated solar power plant

Gemasolar
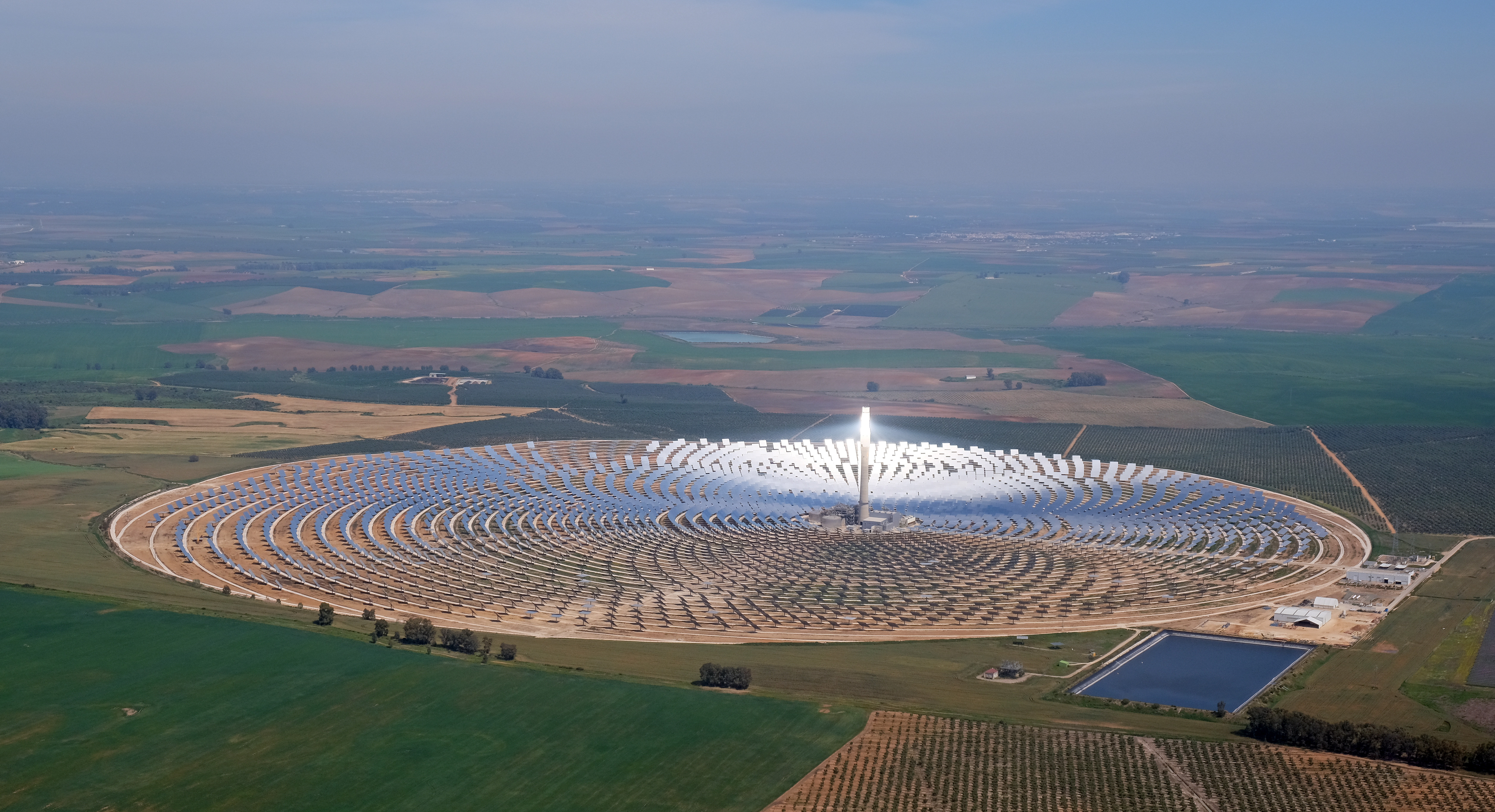
- The Gemasolar power plant in 2021
- Country: Spain
- Location: Fuentes de Andalucía, Sevilla
- Coordinates: 37°33′29″N 5°19′45″W
- Status: Operational
- Construction began: March 2009
- Commission date: May 2011
- Owner: Torresol Energy

Solar farm
- Type: CSP
- CSP technology: Solar power tower
- Collectors: 2,650
- Site resource: 2,172 kWh/m^{2}/yr
- Site area: 520 acres (210 ha)

Power generation
- Units operational: 1
- Nameplate capacity: 19.9 MW
- Capacity factor: 45.9%
- Annual net output: 80 GW·h
- Storage capacity: 299 MW·h_{e} (670 MW·h_{t})

External links
- Commons: Related media on Commons

Gemasolar is a concentrated solar power plant with a molten salt heat storage system. It is located within the city limits of Fuentes de Andalucía in the province of Seville, Spain.

== Design and specifications ==
The plant is of the solar power tower type CSP and uses concepts pioneered in the Solar One and Solar Two demonstration projects, using molten salt as its heat transfer fluid and energy storage medium. Originally called Solar Tres, it was renamed Gemasolar.

The project, which has received a subsidy of five million euros from the European Commission and a loan of 80 million euros from the European Investment Bank, makes use of the Solar Two technology tested in Barstow, California, but is approximately three times the size. It makes use of several advances in technology after Solar Two was designed and built.

Gemasolar is the first commercial solar plant with central tower receiver and molten salt heat storage technology. It consists of a 30.5-hectare (75-acre) solar heliostat aperture area with a power island and 2,650 heliostats, each with a 120-square-metre (1,300 sq ft) aperture area and distributed in concentric rings around the 140-metre-high (460 ft) tower receiver. The total land use of the Heliostats is 195 hectares (480 acres).

The most innovative aspects of the plant, which belongs to the company Torresol Energy, are its molten salt receiver, its heliostats aiming system and its control system. In addition, its storage system allows it to produce electricity for 15 hours without sunlight (at night or on cloudy days). This storage capacity makes its solar power manageable so that it can be supplied based on demand. The plant has already been able to supply a full day of uninterrupted power supply to the grid, using thermal transfer technology developed by SENER.

Gemasolar, with its 19.9 MW of power, can supply 80 GWh per year — enough to supply power to 27,500 homes. The plant has been operational since May 2011. Its official launch was held in October 2011.

== Performance ==
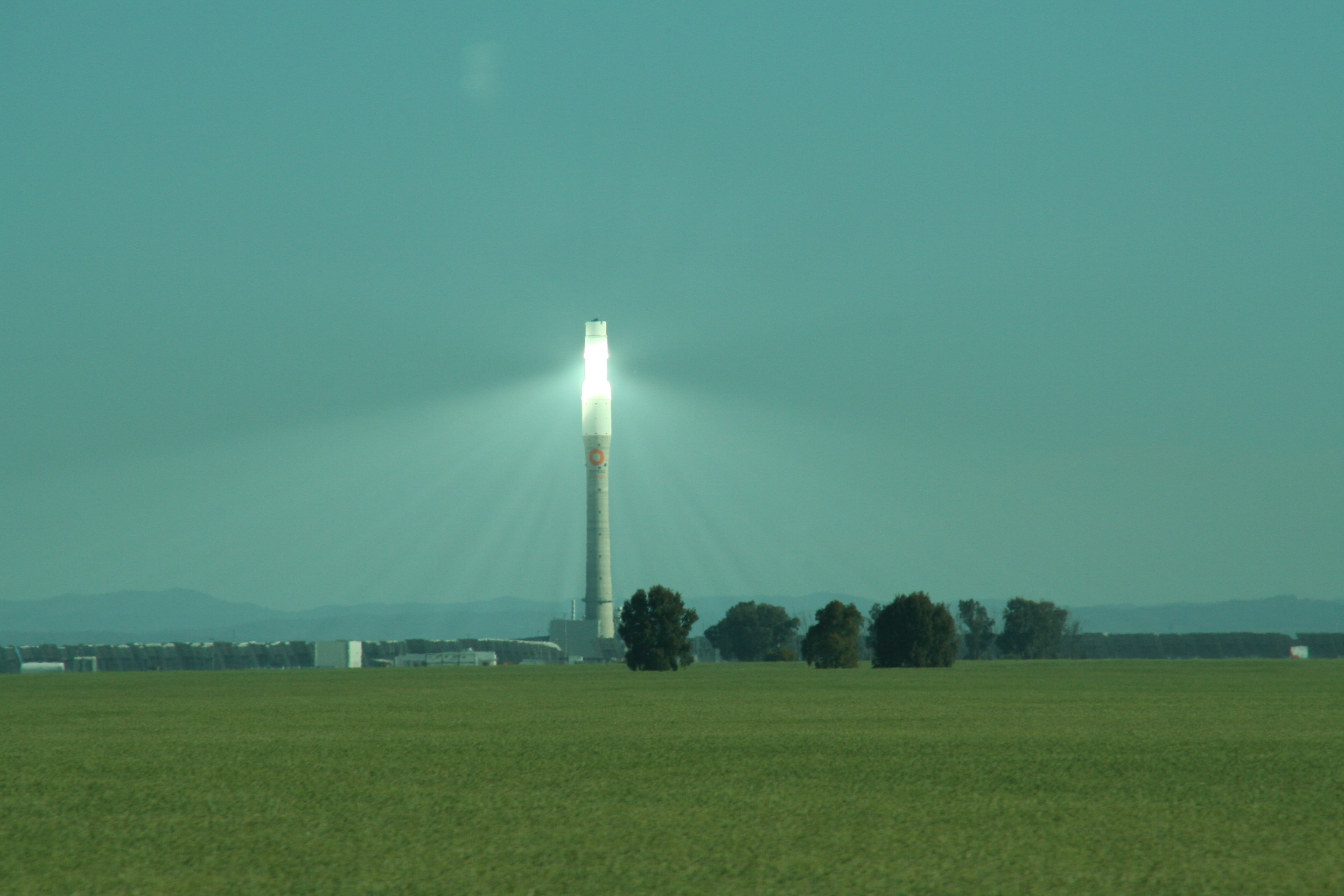
Gemasolar in 2012

After the second year of operation the plant has exceeded projected expectations. In 2013, the plant achieved continuous production, operating 24 hours per day for 36 consecutive days, a result which no other solar plant has attained so far. Total operation is 6,450 hours at full capacity per year, preventing about 30,000 tons of CO_{2} emissions per year.

== See also ==
- List of solar thermal power stations
- Renewable energy in the European Union
- Sener Aeronáutica
- Solar thermal energy
- The Solar Project
