= Cádiz (wine region) =

Cádiz VdlT
- Wine region
- Cádiz VdlT in the province of Cádiz in the region of Andalusia
- Type: Vino de la Tierra
- Country: Spain

Cádiz is a Spanish appellation describing Vino de la Tierra wines whose terroir is located in the autonomous region of Andalusia. Vino de la Tierra is one step below the mainstream Denominación de Origen indication on the Spanish wine quality ladder.

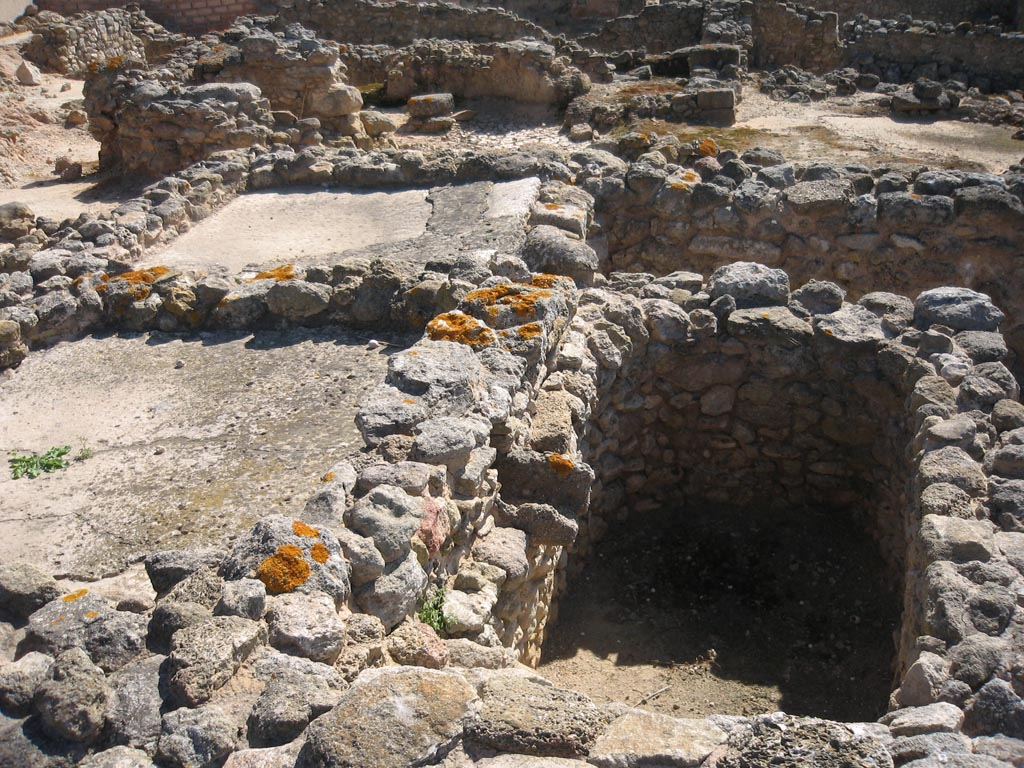
Ancient wine cellar

The area covered by this geographical indication comprises the following municipalities: Arcos de la Frontera, Chiclana de la Frontera, Chipiona, El Puerto de Santa María, Jerez de la Frontera Prado del Rey, Puerto Real, Rota, Sanlúcar de Barrameda, Olvera, Setenil, Villamartín, Bornos, Trebujena and San José del Valle, in the province of Cádiz (Andalusia, Spain).

It acquired its Vino de la Tierra status in 2005.

== Grape varieties ==
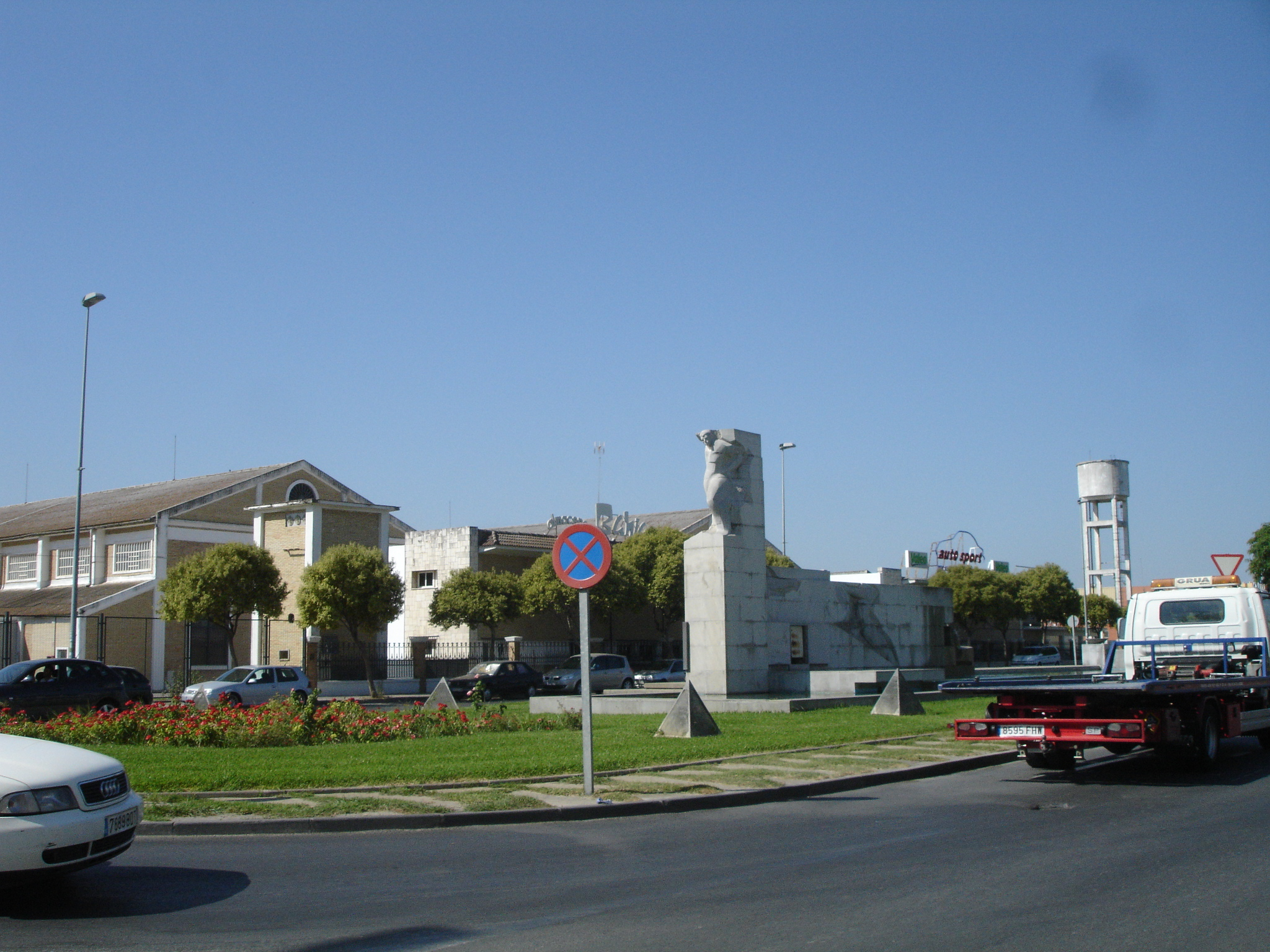
Monument to grape harvesting

- Red: Syrah, Monastrell, Merlot, Tintilla de Rota, Petit Verdot Cabernet Franc, Garnacha tinta, Tempranillo and Cabernet Sauvignon
- White: Garrido, Palomino, Chardonnay, Moscatel, Mantía, Perruno, Macabeo, Sauvignon blanc and Pedro Ximénez.
