= SENER Foundation =

SENER Foundation was established in May 2002 by SENER Grupo de Ingeniería and Sendagorta family aiming to promote initiatives and to support activities based on two principles: contribution to community social service through training and development of the socially responsible part of professional activities. The main goals of the SENER Foundation, headed by Enrique de Sendagorta Aramburu, are:

- Spread the spirit of Sendagorta brothers, Enrique and José Manuel, founders of SENER, a spirit characterized by the search for scientific and technological knowledge. Apply this knowledge to engineering projects to better meet the needs of its surroundings and time frame.
- Support the work and/or training of people or groups that stand out for their capabilities and initiative, scientific or technological competence, and ethical responsibility.
- Contribute to society's moral and material progress through scientific and technological projects and programs.

== Activities ==
SENER Foundation's activities are aimed at supporting the training of young engineers and technology projects by awarding prizes, scholarships and grants to finance projects of high scientific and technological content.

=== Scholarship program ===
SENER Foundation has a scholarship program for supporting young engineers from Eastern Europe, Latin America and Asia. The Foundation helps them participate in masters or doctorate programs at prestigious Spanish, European or American universities, specializing in Aerospace Engineering, Civil Engineering, Power and Process Engineering and Marine Engineering. Once these engineers have completed their studies, they join SENER as interns within the technical section of the company that best suits their specialization.

=== Grants and cooperation ===
The SENER Foundation cooperates with other entities and organizations lending support to technological projects that solve basic needs of certain groups of persons. These collaborations materialize in providing knowledge and advice from the company's engineers. In 2007, in cooperation with the NIDO Foundation, SENER launched a project to improve quality of life for those with severe cerebral palsy, adapting and optimizing the wheel chairs they use. SENER Foundation contributed with its engineering and construction experience in materials application, fatigue analysis of the wheel chairs, structure development, simple mechanisms, etc. In 2009, three modified chairs were delivered to NIDO, assigning the intellectual property rights in order to facilitate its manufacture.

=== Awards ===
In collaboration with SENER's Marine engineering area, the SENER Foundation grants various awards aimed at engineering projects and research work. At the Polytechnic University of Madrid (UPM), the company has launched an award that recognizes the efforts of the best students in the Programming Languages course, given at the School of Naval Engineering of the Polytechnic University of Madrid (UPM). Likewise, this award also recognizes and rewards the best PhD in engineering. The SENER Foundation Awards for Best PhD's are intended to stimulate research in scientific and technological areas, in which SENER concentrates its business activities (Aerospace, Civil and Architecture, Power and Process, and Marine Engineering). With an annual call, these awards are directed to all persons who have obtained a PhD at a European university in any area related to the fields of activity of the company under the condition that the degree must have been completed within the same year of the call.
