= Sherry Triangle =

Wine region in Cádiz, Spain

Coordinates: 36.69°N 6.27°W

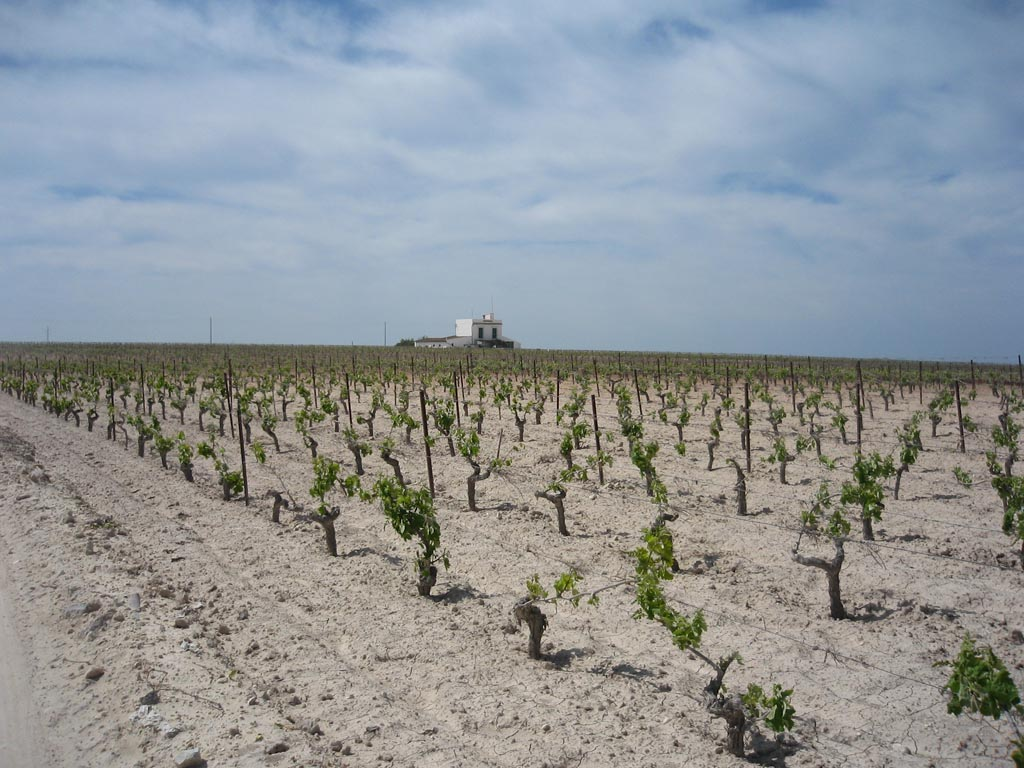
Landscape

The Sherry Triangle is an area in the province of Cádiz in southwestern Spain. It is noted for the production of sherry, a type of fortified wine. The cities of Jerez de la Frontera, Sanlúcar de Barrameda, and El Puerto de Santa María are at the vertices of the triangle. The bodegas where the wine is blended and stored are all located within the cities.

== Origin ==
Map

The Denominación de Origen (Designation of Origin) for sherry was established in 1933. The Sherry Triangle is the aging area of "El Marco de Jerez" (the Sherry Setting). All the grapes must come from this wider production area, which includes Trebujena, Chiclana, Puerto Real, Rota, Chipiona and Lebrija.

Exports of sherry fell considerably during the period 2002–2014, with Spain itself becoming the largest consumer, moving ahead of the UK and Holland. Exports fell from 700,000hl in 2002 to 370,000hl in 2011. Between 2007 and 2011, 35% of the region's vineyards were taken out of production under an EU grubbing up initiative.

== See also ==
- John Harvey & Sons
- Climate of Cadiz province
