= Fuentes de Andalucía =

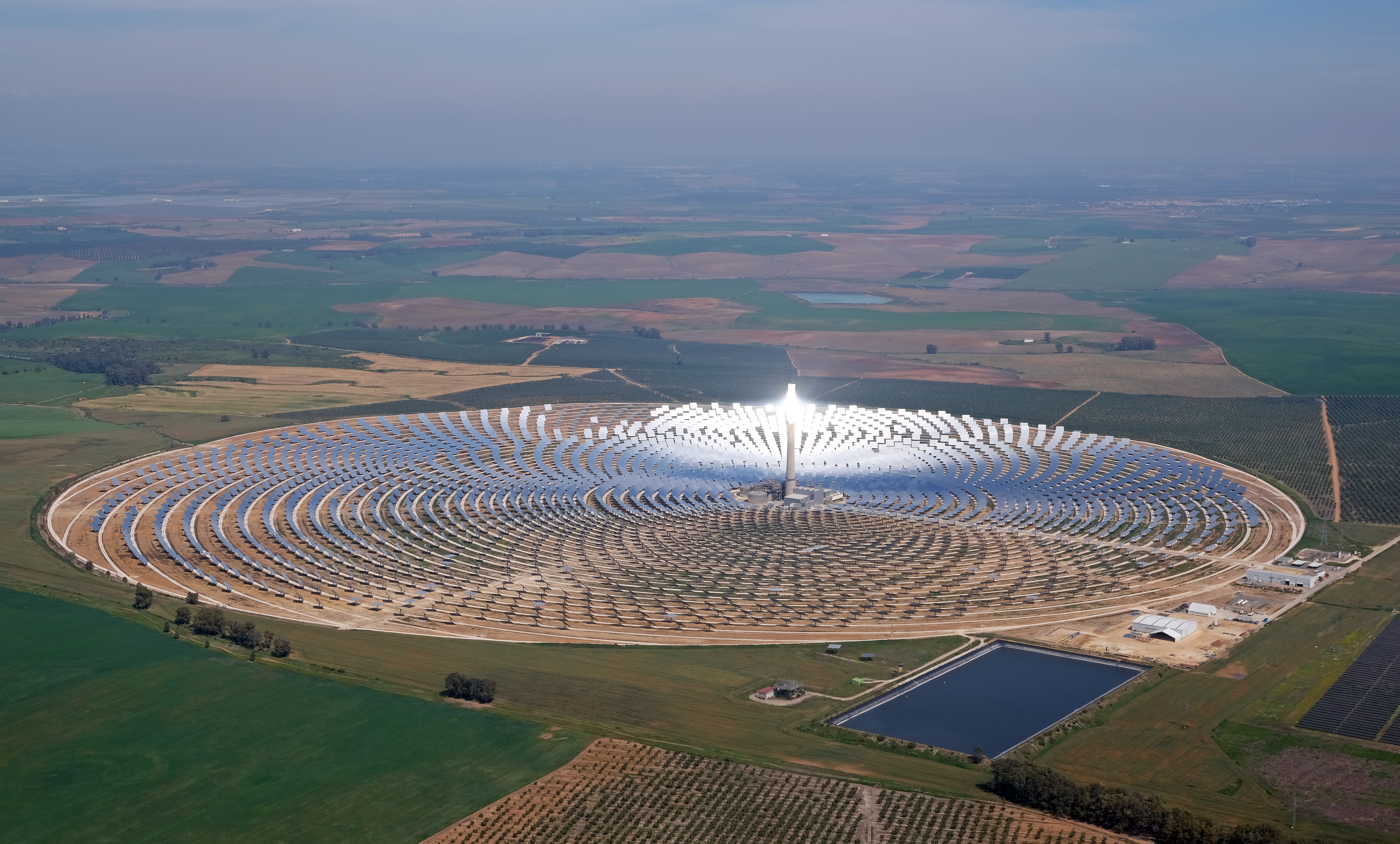
- Gemasolar Thermosolar Plant

- Flag Coat of arms
- Interactive map of Fuentes de Andalucía
- Coordinates: 37°28′N 5°20′W
- Country: Spain
- Province: Seville
- Municipality: Fuentes de Andalucía

Government
  - Mayor: Francisco Martínez Galán (Nueva Izquierda Verde Andaluza)

Area
  - Total: 150 km^{2} (58 sq mi)
- Elevation: 183 m (600 ft)

Population (2025-01-01)
  - Total: 7,247
  - Density: 48/km^{2} (130/sq mi)
- Time zone: UTC+1 (CET)
  - Summer (DST): UTC+2 (CEST)

Fuentes de Andalucía is a village located in the province of Seville, Spain. According to the 2012 census (INE), the village has a population of 7,315 inhabitants.

In 2022, the village temporarily changed its name to Ucrania (Ukraine) in response to a Russian invasion of the country. Numerous streets and locations were named after Ukrainian cities such as Kyiv, Odesa, Mariupol, Kharkiv, and Kherson.

The mayor of the village is Francisco Martínez, a member of the Nueva Izquierda Verde Andaluza party, which heads a left-wing green party coalition.

== Geography ==
Integrated in the Écija region, it is located 64 kilometers from the capital of Seville. The municipal area is crossed by the A-4 South Highway between points 474 and 478 as well as by the A-407 highway that allows communication with Lantejuela and Osuna.

The relief of the municipality is characterized by the Sevillian countryside, extending from the Madre de Fuentes stream, which serves as the border with La Luisiana, to the municipal area of Carmona and from Palma del Río and the A-4 south highway to the municipality of Marchena. The altitude of the territory ranges between 205 meters (Cerro de San Pedro), to the west, and 80 meters on the banks of the stream, to the northeast. The town stands 183 meters above sea level.

=== Climate ===
Fuentes de Andalucía has a mediterranean climate (Köppen climate classification: Csa). Summers are very hot and dry, while winters are mild and moderately wet. This is mainly due to its location in the valley, which causes the heat during the day to accumulate in the region. Precipitation is moderate throughout the year. The lowest temperature ever recorded was −2.7 °C (27.1 °F) on January 18, 2017, while the highest temperature ever recorded was 46.3 °C (115.3 °F) on August 14, 2021.

Climate data for Fuentes de Andalucía (2009-2025), extremes (2009–present)
Month	Jan	Feb	Mar	Apr	May	Jun	Jul	Aug	Sep	Oct	Nov	Dec	Year
Record high °C (°F)	23.5 (74.3)	26.0 (78.8)	31.5 (88.7)	37.0 (98.6)	40.7 (105.3)	44.3 (111.7)	44.7 (112.5)	46.3 (115.3)	44.7 (112.5)	37.4 (99.3)	29.3 (84.7)	23.3 (73.9)	46.3 (115.3)
Mean daily maximum °C (°F)	15.1 (59.2)	17.1 (62.8)	19.7 (67.5)	23.3 (73.9)	28.4 (83.1)	32.7 (90.9)	36.4 (97.5)	37.1 (98.8)	31.7 (89.1)	26.8 (80.2)	19.5 (67.1)	16.3 (61.3)	25.3 (77.6)
Daily mean °C (°F)	10.5 (50.9)	11.9 (53.4)	14.2 (57.6)	17.3 (63.1)	21.3 (70.3)	25.3 (77.5)	28.4 (83.1)	29.2 (84.6)	25.0 (77.0)	21.0 (69.8)	14.6 (58.3)	11.6 (52.9)	19.2 (66.5)
Mean daily minimum °C (°F)	5.8 (42.4)	6.6 (43.9)	8.6 (47.5)	11.3 (52.3)	14.2 (57.6)	17.8 (64.0)	20.3 (68.5)	21.3 (70.3)	18.3 (64.9)	15.1 (59.2)	9.8 (49.6)	7.0 (44.6)	13.0 (55.4)
Record low °C (°F)	−2.7 (27.1)	−2.6 (27.3)	0.7 (33.3)	4.4 (39.9)	6.3 (43.3)	10.4 (50.7)	14.9 (58.8)	14.4 (57.9)	11.4 (52.5)	4.5 (40.1)	1.7 (35.1)	−0.6 (30.9)	−2.7 (27.1)
Average precipitation mm (inches)	53.3 (2.10)	49.7 (1.96)	92.7 (3.65)	48.9 (1.93)	25.6 (1.01)	5.6 (0.22)	0.3 (0.01)	1.2 (0.05)	23.7 (0.93)	79.5 (3.13)	74.0 (2.91)	77.4 (3.05)	531.9 (20.95)
Source: Agencia Estatal de Meteorologia (AEMET OpenData)

== See also ==
- List of municipalities in Seville
