= Eduardo Hernández-Pacheco =

Spanish scientist

Eduardo Hernández-Pacheco y Esteban
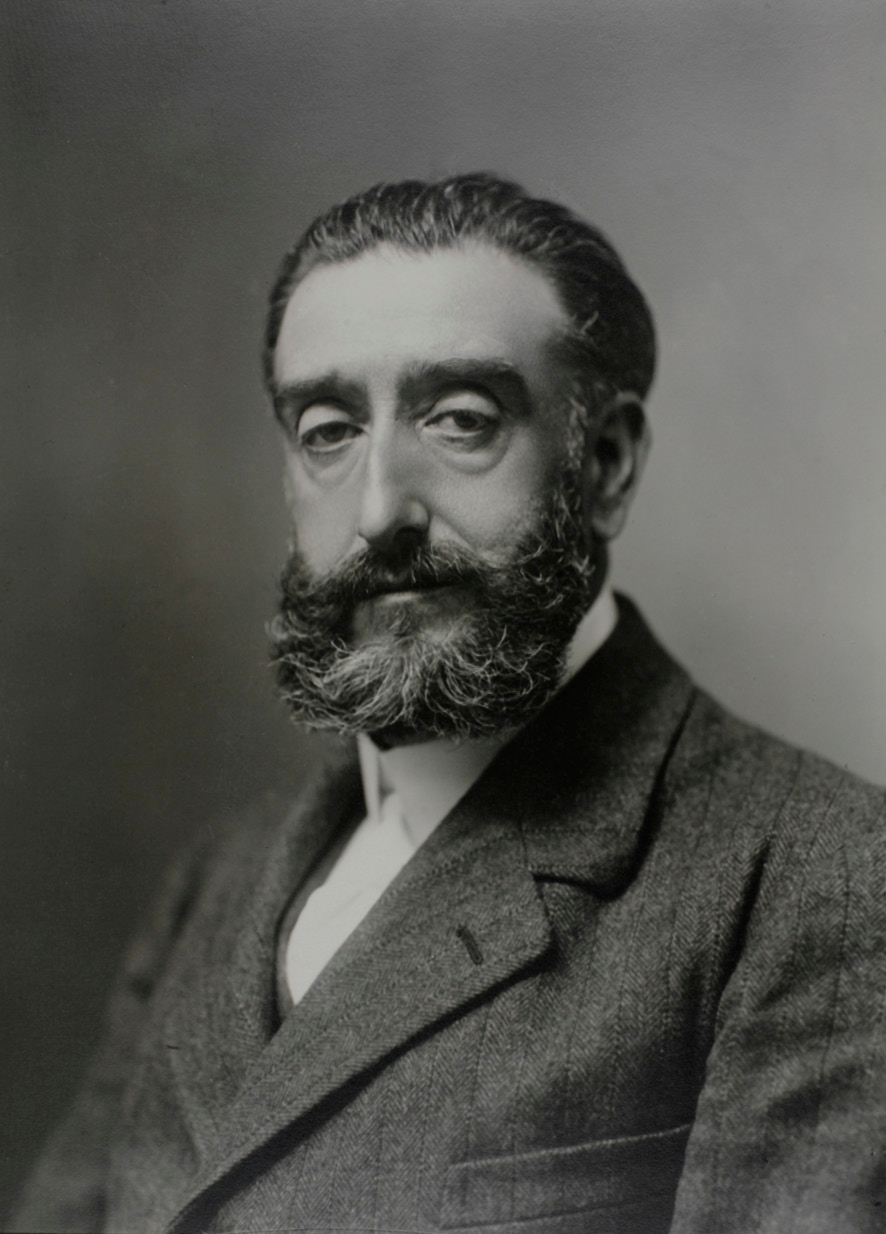
- Eduardo Hernández-Pacheco y Esteban 1910
- Born: 6 May 1872; Madrid, Spain
- Died: 6 March 1965 (aged 92); Alcuescar Cáceres (Spain)
- Education: Complutense University of Madrid
- Awards: Medalla de Plata al Mérito en el Trabajo (1960); Gran Cruz de la Orden Civil de Alfonso X el Sabio (1961)
- Scientific career
- Fields: Geologist; Paleontologist
- Workplaces: Complutense University of Madrid; Natural Sciences Museum, Madrid
- Doctoral advisor: José Macpherson
- Doctoral students: Miquel Crusafont i Pairó; Miguel Bermudo Meléndez Meléndez; José Ramón Bataller Calatayud

Eduardo Hernández-Pacheco y Esteban (Madrid, 23 May 1872 – Alcuéscar, 6 March 1965) was a Spanish geologist, geographer, paleontologist, and archaeologist.

== Biography ==
Eduardo Hernández-Pacheco y Esteban was born in Madrid, where his father, Francisco Hernández-Pacheco y Pavón, was stationed at the time as a military officer. Soon afterward, however, he went to live in Alcuéscar, from where his family originated. There he completed his primary education, later continuing his secondary studies at the institute in Badajoz.

He began his degree in Science in Barcelona, later moving to Madrid to complete his second year, and ultimately earning a degree in Natural Sciences with highest honors in 1893. In 1896, he obtained his Doctorate in Natural Sciences with a dissertation entitled “Geological Study of the Sierra de Montánchez.” In preparing it, he received the support and supervision of José Macpherson, making use of the library and laboratory that Macpherson had installed in his home.

From 1896 onward, he worked as an assistant teacher at the secondary school in Cáceres and at the University of Valladolid, until in 1899 he obtained a professorship at a secondary education institute in Córdoba. In 1903, he published the book Elementary Practices in Natural History. In 1907, he was appointed assistant at the Museo Nacional de Ciencias Naturales in Madrid, moving to that city. In 1910, he was named head of the Museum's Geology Section, and in 1911 he obtained the Chair of Geognostic and Stratigraphic Geology at the Faculty of Sciences of the Universidad de Madrid. The title of this chair was changed to Geography and Dynamic Geology in 1927, and to Geology in 1931.

In the field of paleontology, his principal works dealt with the archaeocyaths of the Lower Paleozoic of the Sierra de Córdoba and with Tertiary vertebrates. At the end of 1911, he discovered the fossil vertebrate site at Cerro del Otero, near the city of Palencia, which he studied the following year together with Juan Dantín Cereceda, focusing particularly on rhinoceroses, mastodons, and giant tortoises. He also described the existence of a fluvial paleochannel at this site.

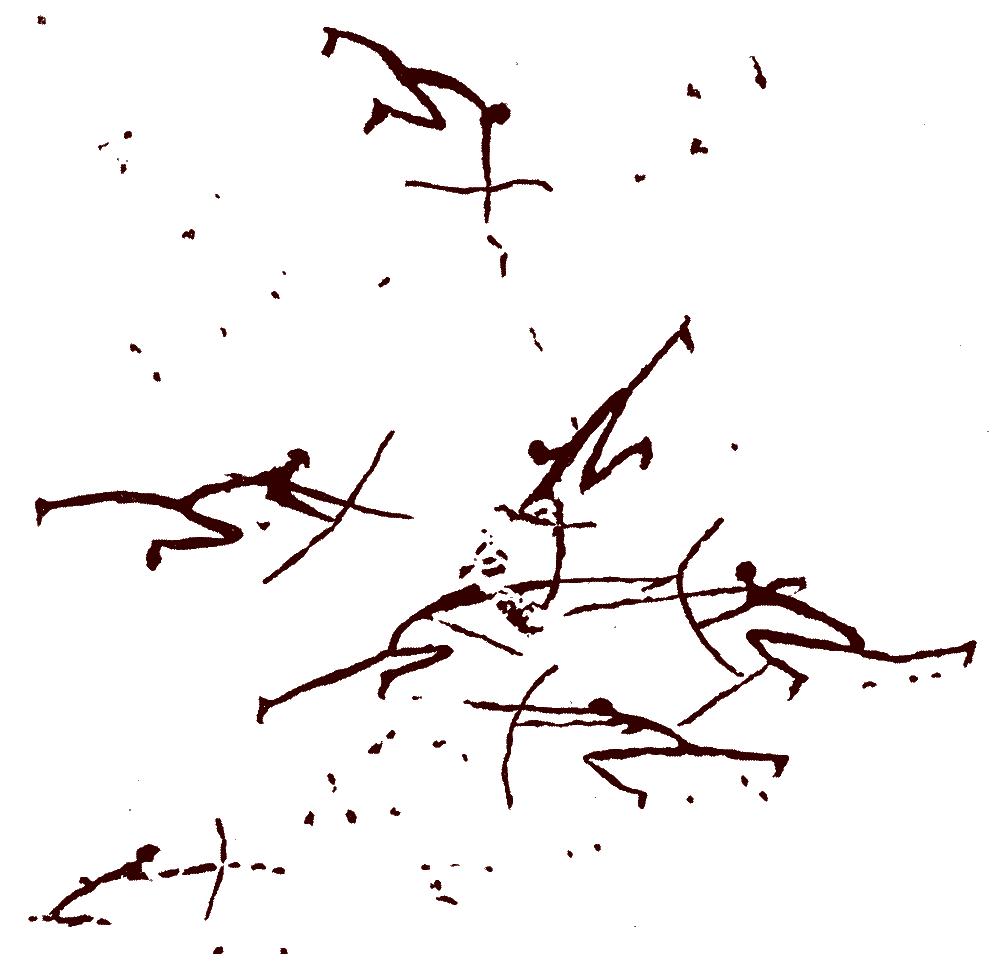
Battle between archers. Prehistoric painting in the Covacha del Roble, Morella (Castellón), Spain

In the field of prehistory, he carried out important studies on the prehistoric paintings of the Levantine region, especially the located in a rock shelter in Morella (Castellón), now recognized as a World Heritage Site. One of them, in the Covacha del Roble, is the earliest known depiction of a battle between archers.

He studied the geology of the Canary Islands. In 1910, he published a book on the island of Lanzarote, describing its volcanic formations and the history of its eruptions. He later also studied the geology and physical geography of Ifni and of what was then the Spanish Sahara.

In 1917, the Central Board of National Parks was established, of which he became a member. In 1921, Hernández-Pacheco was elected a member of the Real Academia de Ciencias Exactas, Físicas y Naturales, delivering his inaugural address in 1922. He was one of the organizers of the Congreso Geológico Internacional, held in Spain in 1926. He prepared guidebooks for the excursion through Sierra Morena and the Baetic plain; together with his son Francisco, he prepared the guide for the excursion to Aranjuez and the territory south of Madrid; and together with Narciso Puig de la Bellacasa, he authored the Geological Guide to Despeñaperros.

In 1926, he was appointed president of the Commission des Terrasses Pleistocènes et Pliocènes of the Unión Geográfica Internacional. His interest in physical geography led him to publish a major synthesis on Spain, El Solar en la Historia Hispana (1952), and Fisiografía del Solar Hispano in two volumes (1955 and 1956).

== Main publications ==
- (1909). Estudio geológico de Lanzarote y de las isletas Canarias. Memorias de la Real Sociedad española de Historia Natural, 6(4): 167–342.
- (1914). Las pinturas prehistóricas de Peña Tu (Asturias). Comisión de Investigaciones Paleontológicas y Prehistóricas, 2. 35 pp.
- (1915). Geología y Paleontología del Mioceno de Palencia. Comisión de Investigaciones Paleontológicas y Prehistóricas, 5. 295 pp.
- with Obermaier, Hugo (1915). La mandíbula neandertaloide de Bañolas. Comisión de Investigaciones Paleontológicas y Prehistóricas, 6. 43 pp.
- (1917). Hallazgo de tortugas gigantescas en el Mioceno de Alcalá de Henares. Boletín de la Real Sociedad Española de Historia Natural, 17: 194–200
- (1924). Las pinturas prehistóricas de las Cuevas de la Araña (Valencia). Comision de investigaciónes paleontológicas y prehistóricas, memoria nº 34. Publicaciones del Museo Nacional de Ciencias Naturales.
- (1926). La Sierra Morena y la Llanura Bética (Síntesis Geológica). Congreso Geológico Internacional. Madrid, 1926. Publicaciones del Instituto Geológico de España. 150 pp.
- (1934). Síntesis fisiográfica y geológica de España. Trabajos del Museo Nacional de Ciencias Naturales, 38. 584 pp.
- (1949). El Sáhara español. Estudio geológico, geográfico y botánico. Publicaciones de la Dirección General de Marruecos y Colonias. 810 pp.
- (1952). El solar en la Historia Hispana. Memorias de la Real Academia de Ciencias Exactas, Físicas y Naturales, Serie de Ciencias Naturales, 15. 766 pp. Madrid.
- (1955 ). Fisiografía del Solar Hispano. Vol. 1. Memorias de la Real Academia de Ciencias Exactas, Físicas y Naturales, Serie de Ciencias Naturales, 16, (1). 665 pp.
- (1956). Fisiografía del Solar Hispano. Vol. 2. Memorias de la Real Academia de Ciencias Exactas, Físicas y Naturales, Serie de Ciencias Naturales, 16, (2), 793 pp.
