= San José del Valle =

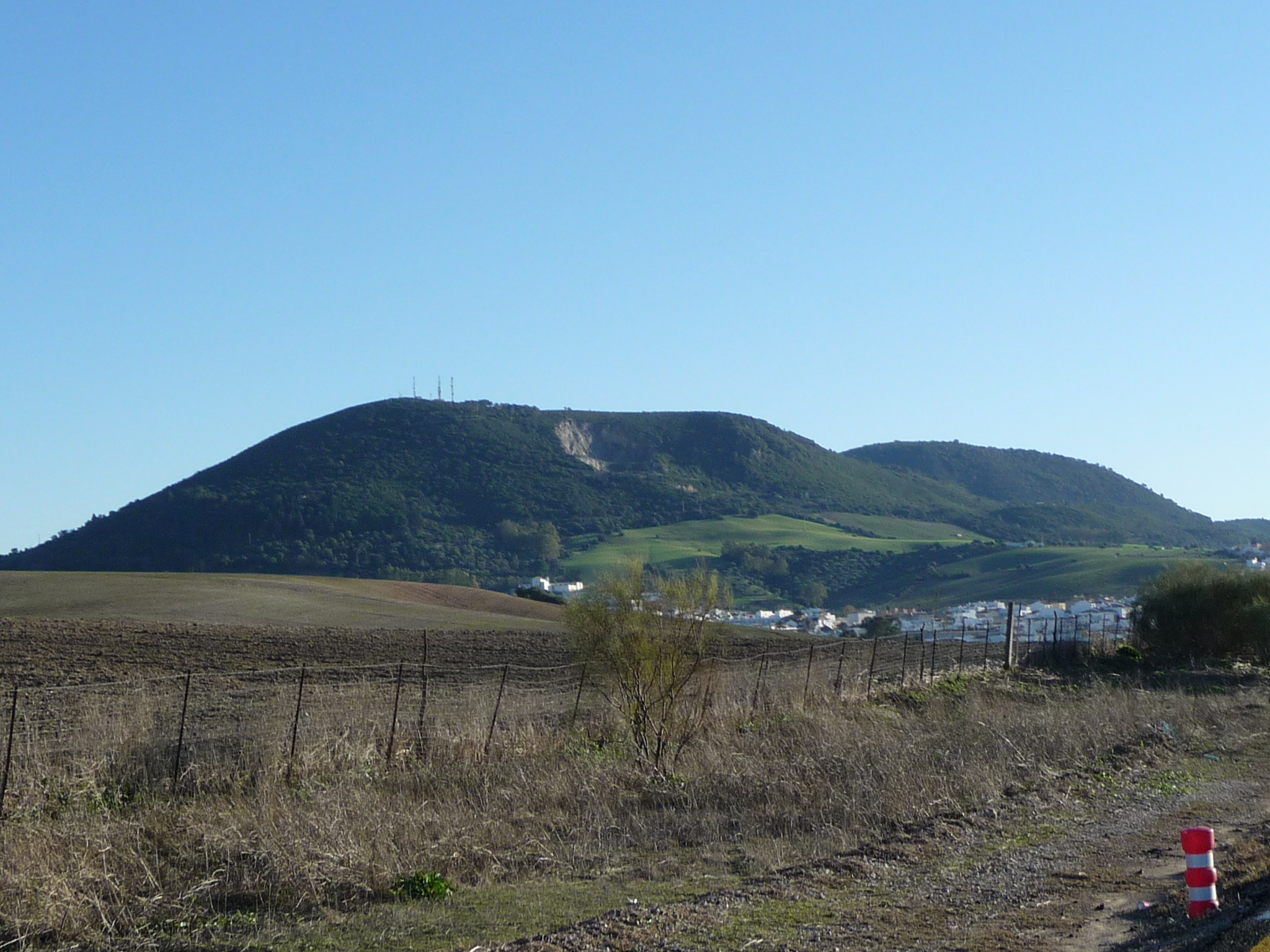

- Flag Coat of arms

- Location in Spain
- Coordinates: 36°36′23″N 5°47′59″W
- Country: Spain
- Autonomous community: Andalusia
- Municipality: Cádiz
- Comarca: Campiña de Jerez

Government
  - Mayor: Juan García Gutiérrez

Area
  - Total: 226 km^{2} (87 sq mi)

Population (2025-01-01)
  - Total: 4,419
  - Density: 19.6/km^{2} (50.6/sq mi)
- Time zone: UTC+1 (CET)
  - Summer (DST): UTC+2 (CEST)
- Website: Official website

San José del Valle is a municipality located in the province of Cádiz, southern Spain.

== See also ==
- List of municipalities in Cádiz
