= Solar power in the United Arab Emirates =

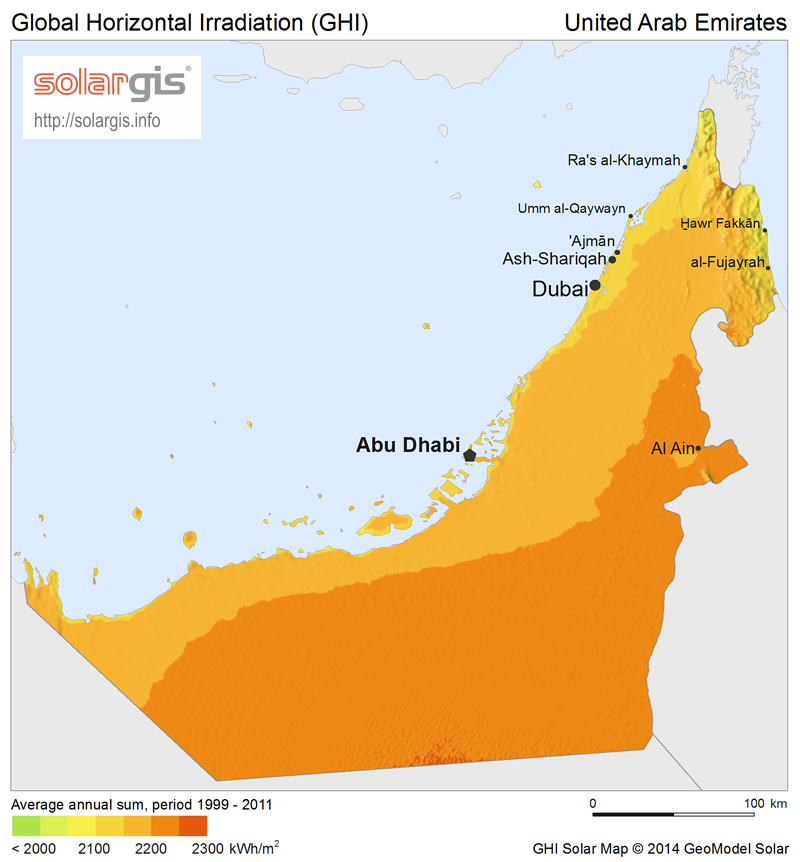
Solar potential in the United Arab Emirates

While being a major oil producing country, the United Arab Emirates (UAE) has taken steps to introduce solar power on a large scale. However, solar power still accounts for a small share of energy production in the country. The country was the 6th top carbon dioxide emitter per capita in the world in 2009, with 40.31 tonnes, but is planning to generate half of its electrical energy by 2050 from solar and nuclear sources, targeting 44% renewables, 38% gas, 12% coal, and 6% nuclear energy sources.

Total installed solar power capacity in the UAE was over 7.5 gigawatts (GW) in 2025, up from 133 MW in 2014. Solar energy provided 4.5% of national electricity generation in the UAE in 2022 and 8.3% in 2023, compared to 0.3% in 2014.

== By region ==
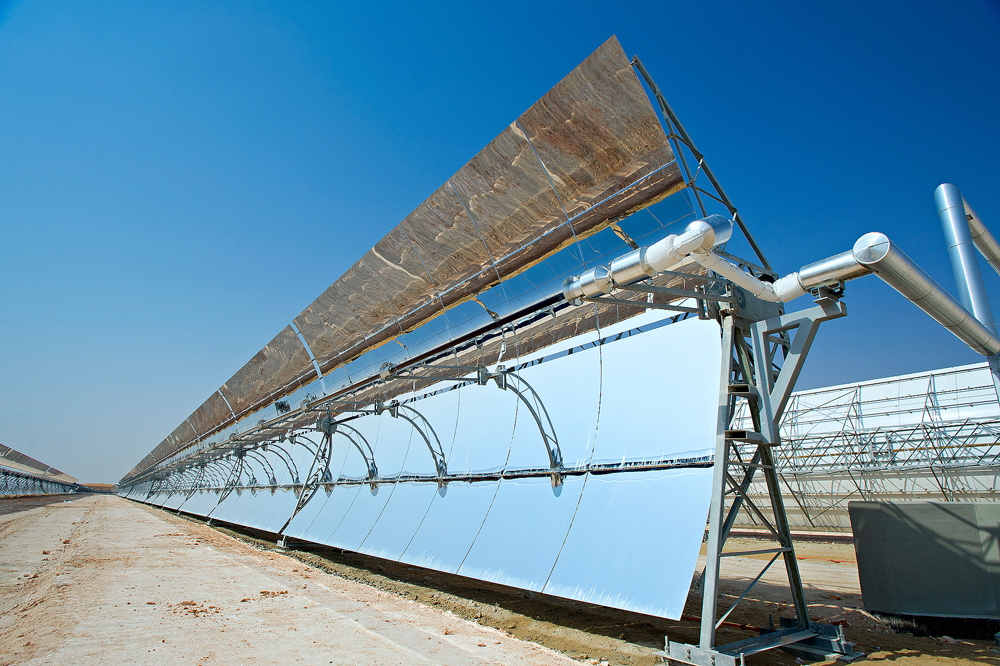
Shams Solar Power Station in Abu Dhabi

=== Abu Dhabi ===
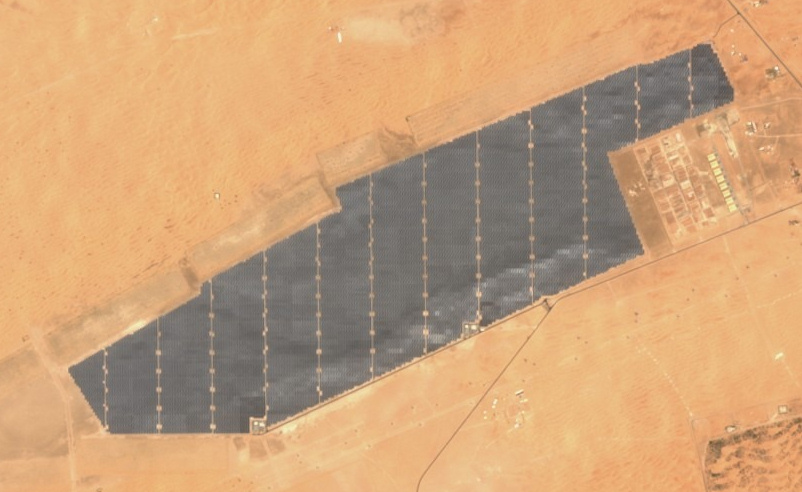
Noor Abu Dhabi plant, Sweihan

In 2013, the Shams solar power station, a 100-megawatt (MW) concentrated solar power (CSP) plant near Abu Dhabi became operational. The US$600 million Shams 1 is the largest CSP plant outside the United States and Spain and is expected to be followed by two more stations, Shams 2 and Shams 3.

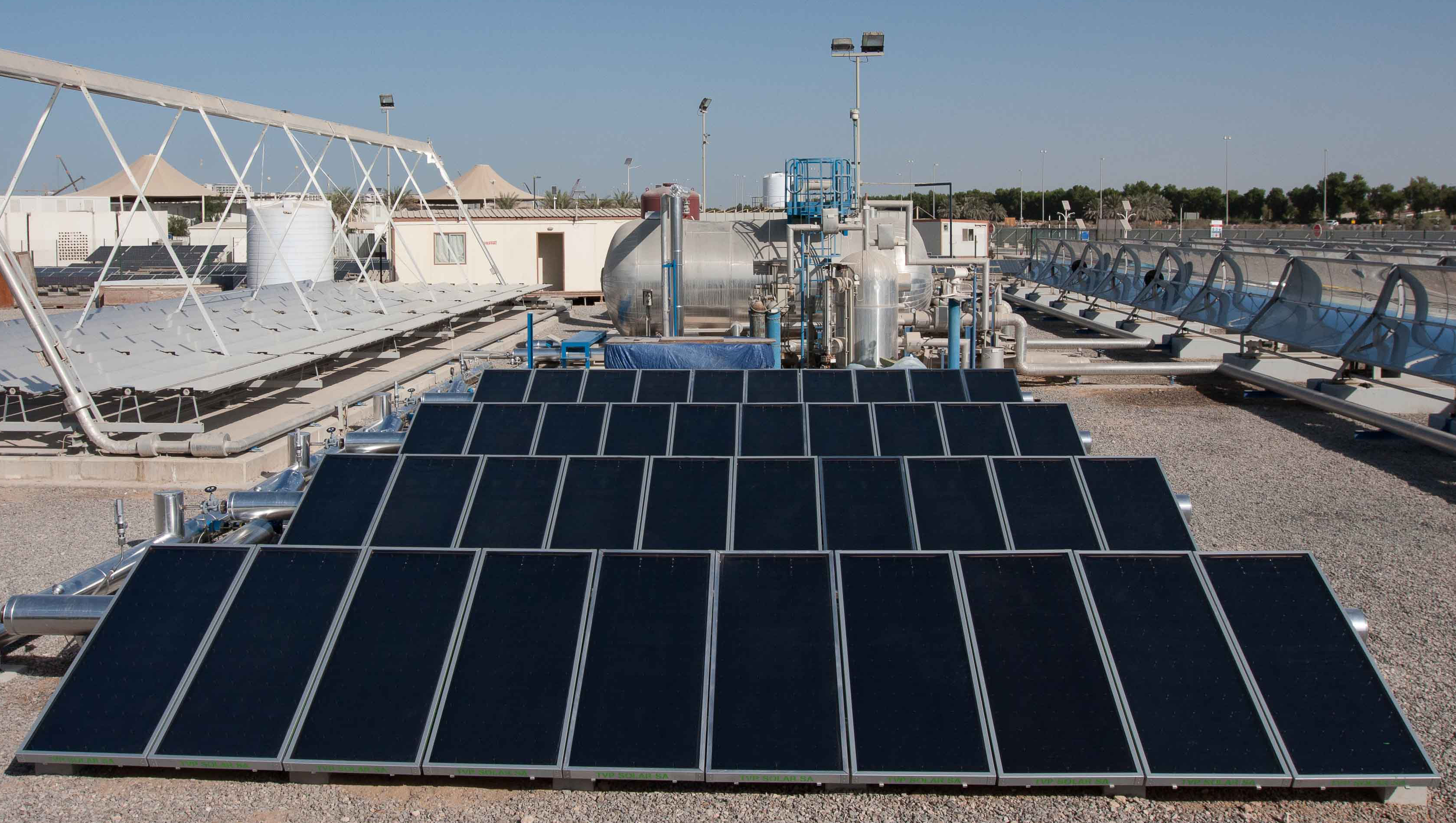
Solar flat plate collectors, Masdar City

Masdar City in Abu Dhabi was designed to be the most environmentally sustainable city in the world. Power is generated by a 10 MW solar PV power plant located on site and 1 MW of rooftop solar panels. Originally planned to have all rooftop panels, it was found easier to clean the sand off ground mounted panels at a single location. It Is located on Abu Dhabi.

In 2020 the 2 GW Al Dhafra Solar project was announced by the Abu Dhabi Electricity and Water Authority. A consortium led by France's EDF and China's Jinko Solar will build the 20 square kilometres (7.7 sq mi) PV plant in the Al Dhafra region, about 35 km south of Abu Dhabi City, using bifacial (dual-sided) crystalline technology. It will offer the lowest solar energy tariff in the world - AED4.97 fils/kWh (US1.35 cents/kWh). The plant was officially opened in November 2023. It is jointly owned by Abu Dhabi National Energy Company with a 40% share, and Masdar, EDF Renewables and Chinese equipment supplier Jinko Power with 20% each.

Khazna Data center which is a data processing and storage centre in Abu Dhabi labeled AUH 6 has all of its electricity provided by Solar power. Masdar corp, a state owned renewable energy company was contracted to create the necessary infrastructure with 7 MW generated by the on site solar PV plant.

Furthermore, State owned Ghantoot desalination plant in Abu Dhabi is also powered by solar power. Desalination consumes a lot of energy, using a renewable source of energy for this key infrastructure facility strengthens its water security.

ADNOC Distribution, which is the largest Petrol & Diesel retailer in the UAE plans to install solar panels on the roofs of its 502 gas stations across the country. This would "decarbonize their operations up to 25%" according to ADNOC. Many more key infrastructure facilities in Abu Dhabi are planned to go solar for their energy needs in the future.

=== Dubai ===
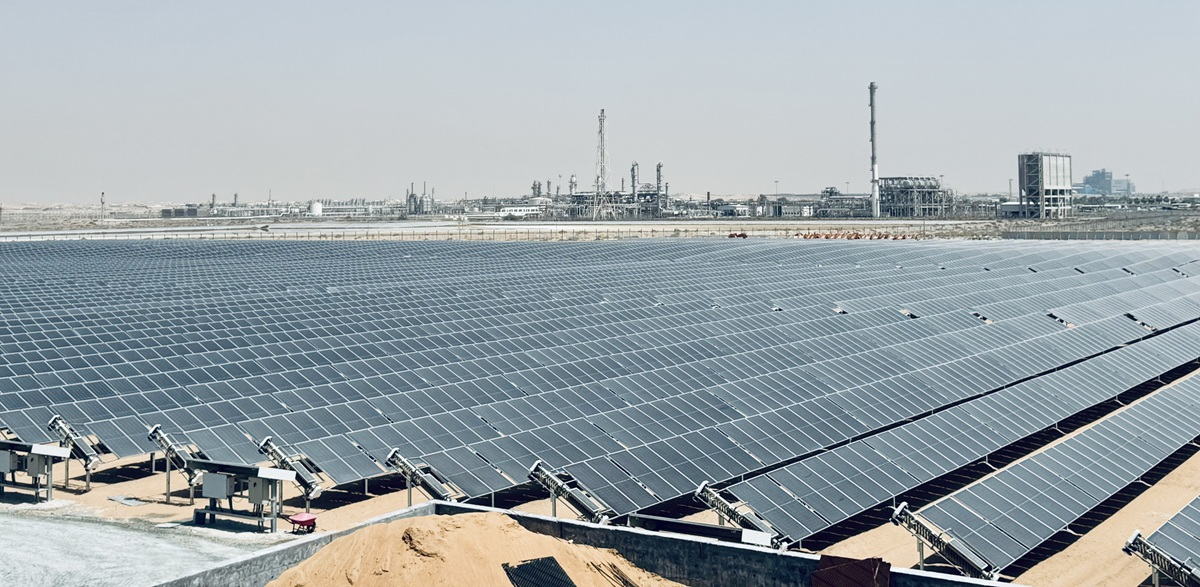
Sajaa solar plant

The Dubai Clean Energy Strategy aims to provide 7 per cent of Dubai's energy from clean energy sources by 2020. It will increase this target to 25 per cent by 2030 and 75 per cent by 2050. Due to a variety of factors, a Saudi-backed consortium had a low bid to build the solar farm in Dubai for only 3¢/kWh.

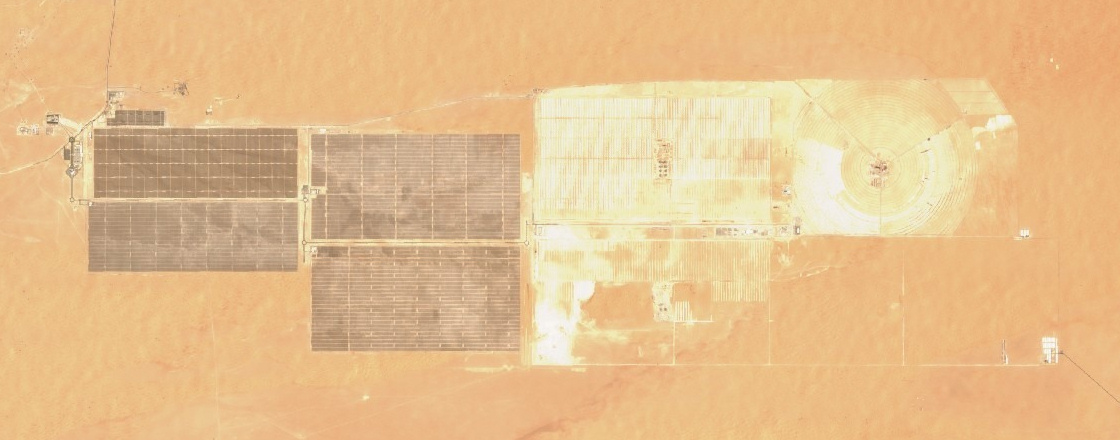
Mohammed bin Rashid Al Maktoum Solar Park, Saih Al-Dahal

The first phase of the Mohammed bin Rashid Al Maktoum Solar Park, in Saih Al-Dahal, about 50 kilometers south of the city of Dubai, was the 13-megawatt (DC) solar farm (DEWA 13) that had been constructed by First Solar in 2013. It uses 152,880 FS-385 black CdTe modules and generates about 24 gigawatt-hours per year.

The second phase is a 200 MW_{AC} (260 MW_{p}) photovoltaic plant built at a cost of US$320 million by a consortium led by ACWA Power and Spanish company TSK. The second phase was scheduled to be commissioned by April 2017. It was completed ahead of time and commissioned on 22 March 2017. TSK served as the primary contractor for the project, while ACWA Power will operate the plant. The phase includes 2.3 million photovoltaic solar panels spread over an area of 4.5 km^{2}. ACWA Power secured a 27-year debt financing loan worth $344 million from the First Gulf Bank, the National Commercial Bank and the Samba Financial Group. The plant uses First Solar's CdTe modules.

The 200-megawatt second phase of the project caused worldwide attention, as the winning bid of the tender set a new record-low tariff of only US ¢5.89 per kilowatt-hour in 2015. This was about 20% lower than any previous, unsubsidized power purchase agreement (PPA) the world has seen before. The PPA is set to a 25-year time frame.

In April 2015, Dubai Electricity and Water Authority (DEWA) publicly announced the third phase of 800 MW, along with Dubai's revised target to increase the share of renewables on the energy mix to 7% by 2020.

The Mohammed bin Rashid Al Maktoum Solar Park is one of the world's largest renewable projects based on an independent power producer (IPP) model. Besides the three phases that consist of solar farms using PV technology, the long-term project will also include concentrating solar power (CSP). The total capacity of the entire project is planned to reach 4,660 MW in six phases.

In parallel to the utility-scale projects of the Mohammed bin Rashid Al Maktoum Solar Park, in March 2015 DEWA also launched a net metering scheme to encourage companies and private individuals to install solar power on their roofs. While the scheme is currently voluntary, solar panels are to be made mandatory for all buildings in Dubai by 2030.

Under DEWA's Shams Dubai programme, homes and businesses can install rooftop solar photovoltaic systems for on-site consumption and connect them to the electricity grid. Electricity generated by the system is used at the property first; surplus electricity exported to the grid is credited against future electricity consumption on the customer's DEWA account. The arrangement uses a bidirectional meter to record imported and exported electricity. Applications and grid connection work are carried out through DEWA-enrolled solar PV contractors or consultants.

=== Ras Al Khaimah ===
In 2016, UTICO, a private Emirati desalination and power company, proposed building two photovoltaic system plants in Ras Al Khaimah: a 120 MW farm and a 20 MW farm. American University of Ras Al Khaimah conducts research on solar power and runs a solar/diesel hybrid mini-grids.

Ras Al Khaimah has revealed a strategy in January 2019 of building a 1.2GW solar project consisting of 600MW of rooftop solar and 600MW of utility-scale projects called Barjeel as part of the emirate's strategy in achieving 30% energy efficiency improvements, 20% water savings and 20% renewable energy generation by 2040.

=== Sharjah ===
In 2019, the Sharjah National Oil Corporation (SNOC), commissioned two small solar plants at their facilities in Hamriyyah. The projects demonstrated the potential for integrating solar power plants into existing brownfield hydrocarbon facilities and are expected to reduce the corporation's carbon footprint by 8,600 tonnes over 25 years.

In June 2025, the Sharjah National Oil Corporation (SNOC), in partnership with Emerge (a joint venture between Masdar and EDF Renewables) commissioned the 60 MW Sana solar power plant at SNOC's main hydrocarbon processing complex in the Sajaa industrial area. Over the course of a full year, the solar plant generates more electricity than the Sajaa facility consumes, with surplus energy supplied to the Sharjah Electricity and Water Authority.

Plans have also been announced by BEEAH to start the middle east's first landfill conversion to a solar park with a planned output of 120 MW with 68 hectares of land used.

== See also ==
- Energy in the United Arab Emirates
- Dubai Electricity and Water Authority
- Sharjah Electricity and Water Authority
- List of power stations in the United Arab Emirates
