= Energy in the United Arab Emirates =

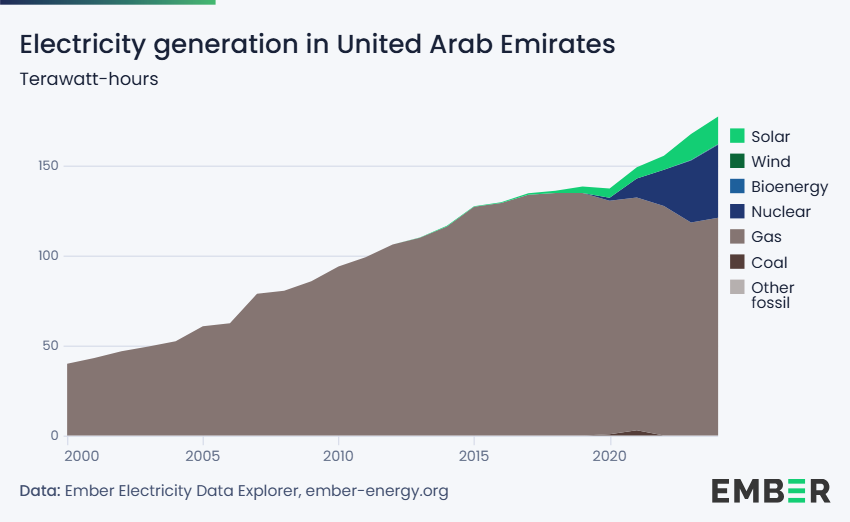
Electricity generation in the United Arab Emirates in terawatt-hours

Energy in the United Arab Emirates describes energy and electricity production, consumption and import in the United Arab Emirates (UAE). The UAE has 7% of global proved oil reserves, about 100 billion barrels. Primary energy usage in 2009 in the UAE was 693 TWh and 151 TWh per million persons.

In 2024, fossil fuels, primarily natural gas, accounted for about 75% of the UAE's electricity capacity, while the remainder came from nuclear and solar energy sources.

== Overview ==
Energy in the United Arab Emirates
	Population million	Prim. energy TWh	Production TWh	Export TWh	Electricity TWh	CO_{2}-emission Mt
2004	4.32	510	1,907	1,273	49.0	103
2007	4.37	601	2,074	1,267	70.5	131
2008	4.48	680	2,100	1,196	75.8	147
2009	4.60	693	1,963	1,084	79.5	147
2010	7.51	723	2,050	1,129	83.0	154
2012	7.89	769	2,211	1,246	83.8	166
2012R	9.21	785	2,260	1,252	93.7	171
2013	9.35	809	2,345	1,316	98.6	168
Change 2004-10	73.8%	41.8%	7.5%	11.3%	69.5%	49.4%
Mtoe = 11.63 TWh, Prim. energy includes energy losses 2012R = CO_{2} calculation criteria changed, numbers updated

== Oil production ==
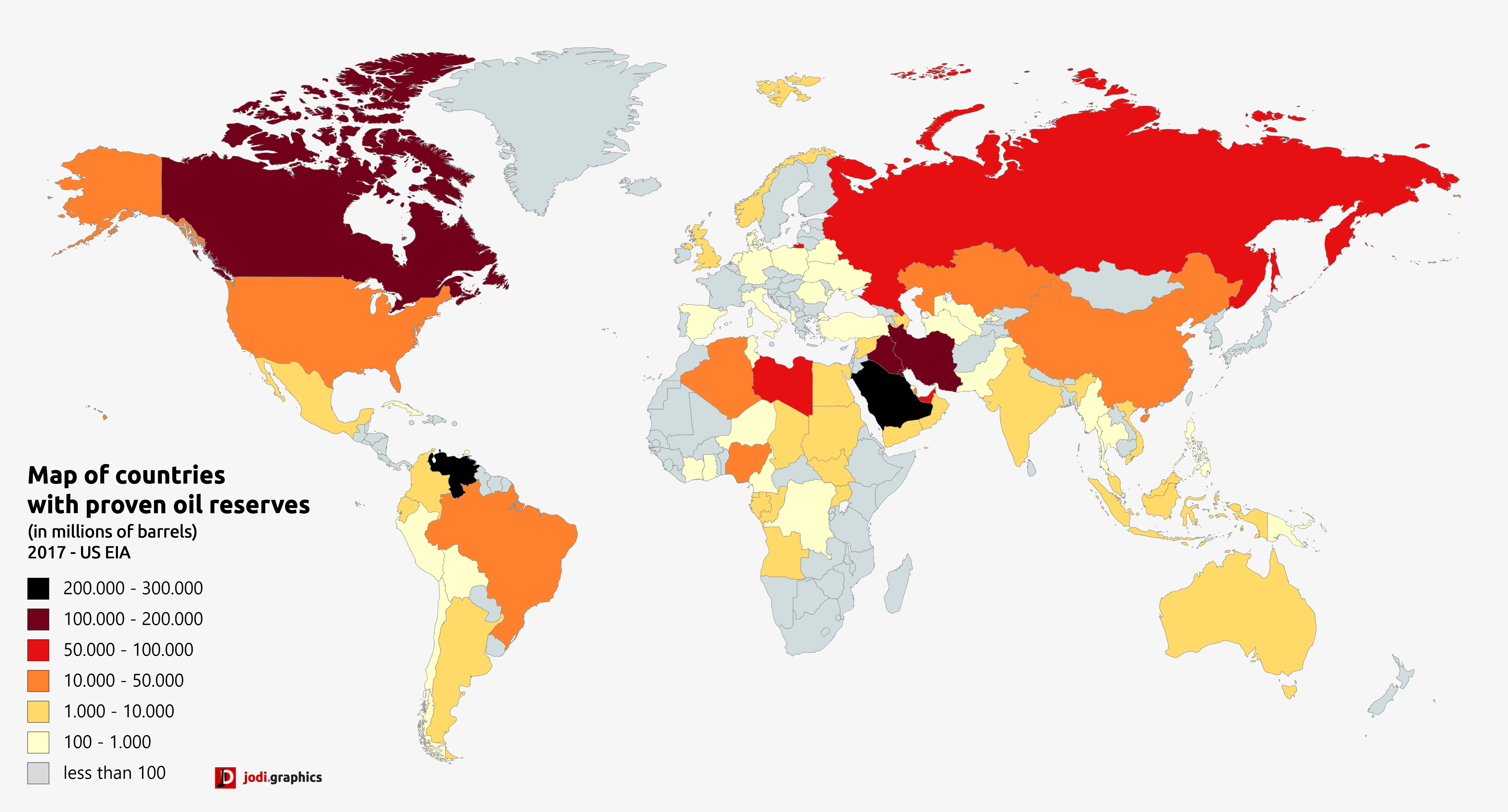
A map of world oil reserves according to U.S. EIA, 2017

In 2025, the United Arab Emirates held an estimated 120 billion barrels of proved crude oil reserves. Crude oil and condensate production reached 3.8 million barrels per day, and the UAE was the ninth-largest total liquid fuels producers in the world.

== Gas production ==
UAE has 7th top global proved natural gas reserves, above 6 trillion cubic metres. The global gas production in 2009 was 3 trillion cubic meters.

== Solar ==
The UAE has massive solar generation potential, and its energy policy has shifted substantially due to the declining price of solar. Total installed solar power capacity in the UAE was over 5 gigawatts (GW) after switching on the 2 gigawatt (GW) Al Dhafra solar project in November 2023, up from 133 MW in 2014. Solar energy provided 4.5% of national electricity generation in the UAE in 2022 and 8.3% in 2023, compared to 0.3% in 2014.

== Nuclear ==
The UAE is installing nuclear power plants to meet its electricity needs. It has signed an agreement with the U.S. on nuclear cooperation, and is also a signatory to the nuclear non-proliferation treaty.

As of March 2024, all four new nuclear reactors are now fully operational in the Barakah Nuclear station, producing 5,348 MWe of electricity and allowing the UAE to produce 40 TWh of electricity per year.

== Climate change ==
United Arab Emirates was 6th top carbon dioxide emitter per capita in the world in 2009: 40.31 tonnes per capita. Top countries were (tonnes/capita): Gibraltar 152, U.S. Virgin Islands 114, Qatar 80, Netherlands Antilles 51 and Bahrain 43. All emissions from building and cement production are local but some people may argue that some United Arab Emirates produced fuels and/or goods are consumed abroad. The UAE has begun acting aggressively to reduce its carbon emissions. Dubai Electricity and Water Authority (DEWA) plans a 250 MW pumped-storage hydroelectricity at Hatta using 3,300,000 cubic metres (880,000,000 US gal) of water and 300 meter above a lower dam.

UAE is planning to generate half of its electrical energy by 2050 from solar and nuclear sources, targeting 44% renewables, 38% gas, 12% clean coal, and 6% nuclear energy sources.

The UAE intends to introduce electrification into the vehicle park. By 2030, the UAE wants to have 40,000 electric cars on its roads. As of September 2020, there were only 1,900 electric cars registered in the UAE.

In February 2024, British firm Hycap opened offices in Abu Dhabi, UAE, planning a hydrogen-focused complex in the region.

== See also ==
- List of power stations in the United Arab Emirates
- Abu Dhabi National Oil Company
- Abu Dhabi Water Supply
- Dubai Electricity and Water Authority
- Sharjah Electricity and Water Authority
