= Rashid Al Leem =

Rashid Alleem
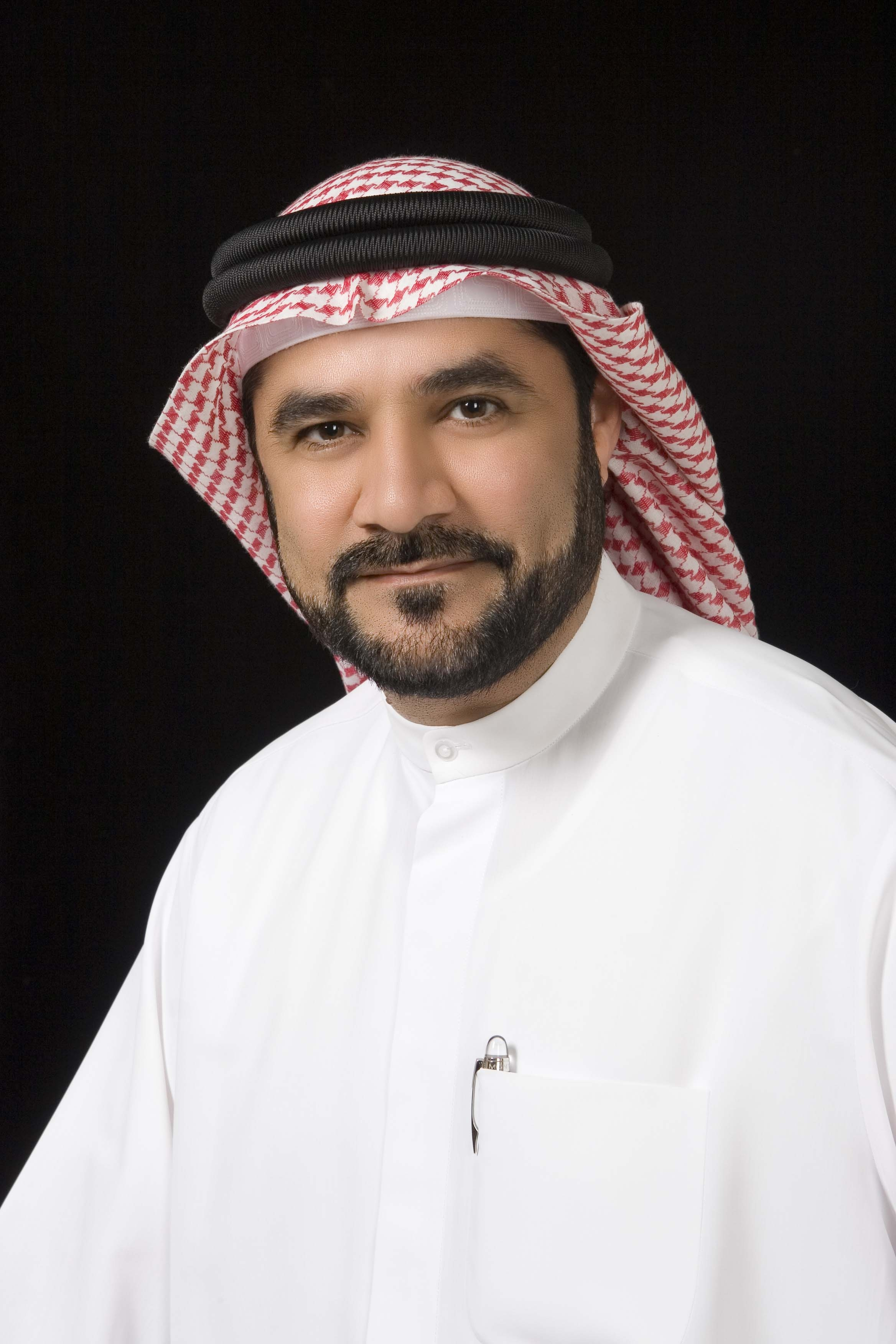
- Born: 1 December 1966 (age 59)
- Education: PhD, University of Salford
- Occupations: Founder and Executive Chairman, Alleem Group
- Organization: Alleem Group
- Notable work: The Alleem Way, The Alleem 21 Sustainable Development Goals, Total Brand Manager
- Title: His Excellency (H.E)
- Board member of: Sharjah University, American University in the Emirates
- Website: Official website

H.E Dr. Rashid Alleem (Arabic: راشد الليم; born Rashid Obaid Juma Alleem) is the former chairman of Sharjah Electricity and Water Authority (SEWA).

Dr. Alleem has been named one of the Top 25 Most Influential CEOs in the GCC and Top 100 Most Influential Leaders in the Middle East. He was awarded an Honorary Professorship by the Academic College of Oxford, UK, for his work in leadership education and community transformation.

He is also the author of several books, and a speaker.

== Personal life ==
He was born on December 1, 1966, to a middle-class family. In 1983, he pursued higher education abroad. After finishing his studies, he joined Amoco Oil in 1989. In 1989, he received the diploma in petroleum engineering from Azusa Pacific University, Los Angeles, US. In 2004, he obtained MBA from Atlantic University, Florida and in 2012, he also received PhD degree in management from University of Salford, UK.

He has also published several books, including My Leadership Secrets and My Green Journey in Hamriyah that details his experience in the Hamriyah Free Zone. He has also written several books about his transnational measures in Sharjah Electricity and Water Authority in his capacity as the Chairman, including The SEWA Way. The Vice-President and Prime Minister of the UAE and Ruler of Dubai, Sheikh Mohammed Bin Rashid Al Maktoum, honoured him with the title Ambassador of Knowledge of the UAE.

== Career ==
In 2000, he was appointed Director-General of Hamriyah Free Zone Authority. In 2011, he was awarded an Excellence in Leadership award from the Federation of Indian Chambers of Commerce & Industry. In 2012, Middle East Business Leaders Award from the President of Indonesia. In 2014, he was appointed as the Chairman of Sharjah Electricity and Water Authority.

== Awards and honours ==
- Middle East Business Leaders Award 2012 by the President of Indonesia.
- The honour of Environmentalist of the Year 2012 by Mahathir Mohamad, Malaysian prime minister.
- The Achievement Award by League of Arab States.
- Gold Medal from the Mayor of Cannes.
- Excellence in Leadership award from Federation of Chamber of Commerce & Industry in India.
- Man of the Year by Khaleej Times newspaper.
- Maritime Personality for 2009 by Marine Business TV.
- Ambassador of Knowledge of the UAE by the Ruler of Dubai.

== Rashid Alleem Premier League (RPL) ==
RPL is a corporate cricket tournament started by H.E. Dr. Rashid Al Leem in 2016 as an initiative to promote Good Health and Well Being, one of the Alleem 21 Sustainable Development Goals. RPL is a Twenty20 cricket tournament played on grass ground and turf pitch with cork ball. Now the tournament just completed its 5th Season in 2020 with 72 corporate cricket teams making it the biggest corporate cricket tournament in GCC. Gulf International won the Season 5, 2020 championship title

RPL matches are live streamed on YouTube and scoring is done online using crichHQ (2017-2018) and CricHeroes (2018-current).

== Bibliography ==
Personal Development

- Quality education
- Is success a sin?
- I am committed
- Dr. Alleem’s Quotations

Leadership & Strategy

- The Alleem way
- The SEWA way
- The SEWA Brand Turnaround and Rejuvenation
- Fostering Creativity & Innovation

Marketing and Branding

- Total Brand manager
- The SEWA marketing plan
- The SEWA Customer-Centric Model

Project Management

- The SEWA project management model

Sustainable development

- My green journey in Hamriyah
- Sustainability – The Fourth Wave of Economy
- Alleem Sustainable Development Goals
- Tolerance: Harmony in Difference

== See also ==
- Hamriyah Free Zone
- Sharjah Electricity and Water Authority
- Emirate of Sharjah
- Dubai Electricity and Water Authority
