= Hamriyah Free Zone =

Company

Hamriyah Free Zone Authority (HFZA)
- Company type: Free Trade Zone
- Founded: 1995
- Headquarters: Sharjah, United Arab Emirates
- Areas served: Industrial, Commercial and General Trading, Services
- Key people: Khaled Bin Abdullah Bin Sultan Al Qasimi (Chairman); Saud Salim Al Mazrouei (Director)
- Products: Offices, warehouses and Land
- Website: hfza.ae

The Hamriyah Free Zone is a free zone place in the city of Sharjah in the United Arab Emirates. Established by an Emiri decree in November, 1995, the Free Zone is 24 square kilometers in size and has a 14 meter deep port and 7 meter deep inner harbor. It is considered the second-largest free-trade zone in the UAE after Jebel Ali Free Zone (JAFZA). Sharjah is the only emirate which has ports on the Arabian Gulf's west coast and east coast with direct access to the Indian Ocean.

In 2010, the Hamriyah Free Zone Authority (HFZA) commissioned and AED 800 million contract for infrastructure expansion and development. It was set to increase its port capacity by up to 80% upon completion.

The free-zone is strategically located on the borders of Ajman and Sharjah, with direct access to Ras Al Khaimah. The zone’s accessibility had been strengthened due to an infrastructure and road building project commissioned by the free zone authority in late 2019, with a project value of AED 94 mln.

== See also ==
- List of company registers
- H.E Dr. Rashid Alleem
- Sharjah Electricity and Water Authority
