= List of power stations in the United Arab Emirates =

The following page lists power stations in United Arab Emirates.

== Legend ==
Facilities under construction
Planned facilities
Decommissioned facilities (year)

== Fossil fuel ==
=== Gas turbines ===
Name	Location	Capacity (MW)	Year completed	Ref
Shuweihat	Jebel Dhana	1,615	2003–2005	
Al Taweelah	Al Samha	4,696	1989–2009	
Aweer/Ameer	Dubai	1,846	1997–2009	
Jebel Ali	Dubai			
Qidfa	Fujairah			
Umm Al Nar	Abu Dhabi	2,746	1979–2007	
Fujairah F1 Independent Water and Power Plant	Fujairah	893	2004	

=== Oil and gas-fired thermal plant ===
To be converted to combined-cycle gas turbine technology to enhance efficiency and reduce emissions.

Plant	Location	Capacity (MW)	Year completed	Ref
Madinat Zayed	Madinat Zayed	118	1991–1993	

== Nuclear ==
Name	Location	Capacity (MW)	Year completed	Ref
Barakah	23°58′04″N 52°13′54″E	5,600	2024	

== Renewable ==
=== Solar ===
Name	Location	Capacity MW_{p} or MW_{AC} (*)	Annual output GWh	Land Size km^{2}	Year completed	Notes	Ref
Shams	Madinat Zayed, Abu Dhabi	100		2.5	2013	Concentrated solar power – parabolic trough collectors	
Noor Abu Dhabi	24°24′11″N 55°16′07″ESweihan	1,177		8	2019	Located at Sweihan	
Mohammed bin Rashid Al Maktoum Solar Park	24°45′N 55°23′E	2,627 operational, 2,033 under construction (As of February 2024)		77	2013–ongoing	World's largest single-site solar park. Phases I-III operational. Phase IV and V under construction. Phase VI (1,800 MW) achieved financial close in February 2024, expected completion 2026. Total capacity to reach 4,660 MW by 2026 and exceed 5,000 MW by 2030. Phase VI achieved record-low LCOE of US$1.6215 cents/kWh.	
Al Dhafra Solar	Al Dhafra, Abu Dhabi	2,000		20	2023	About 35 km south of Abu Dhabi City. World's largest single-site solar plant upon completion. Powers approximately 200,000 homes, displacing 2.4 million tonnes of CO_{2} annually. Bifacial crystalline technology.	
Sir Bani Yas Island Solar	Sir Bani Yas Island, Abu Dhabi	14			2023	Part of UAE Wind Program hybrid facility	

=== Wind ===
Name	Location	Capacity (MW)	Year completed	Notes	Ref
UAE Wind Program – Sir Bani Yas Island	Sir Bani Yas Island, Abu Dhabi	45	2023	Part of the 103.5 MW UAE Wind Program. Hybrid facility with additional 14 MW_{p} solar capacity.	
UAE Wind Program – Delma Island	Delma Island, Abu Dhabi	27	2023	Part of the 103.5 MW UAE Wind Program.	
UAE Wind Program – Al Sila	Al Sila, Abu Dhabi	27	2023	Part of the 103.5 MW UAE Wind Program.	
UAE Wind Program – Al Halah	Al Halah, Fujairah	4.5	2023	Part of the 103.5 MW UAE Wind Program.	
Al Sila Wind IPP	Al Sila, Abu Dhabi	140	TBA	Independent Power Project. RFP issued in 2024, responses due Q2 2025. Expected to power 36,000 homes and displace 190,000 tonnes of CO_{2} annually. Will double Abu Dhabi's wind capacity to approximately 240 MW.	

== Storage ==
Pumped hydroelectric

Name	Location	Capacity MW_{p} or MW_{AC} (*)	Annual output GWh	Land Size km^{2}	Year completed	Notes	Ref
Hatta Hydroelectric Power Plant		250			2024		

== See also ==
- List of power stations in Asia
