= Mohammed bin Rashid Al Maktoum Solar Park =

Solar park in the Emirate of Dubai

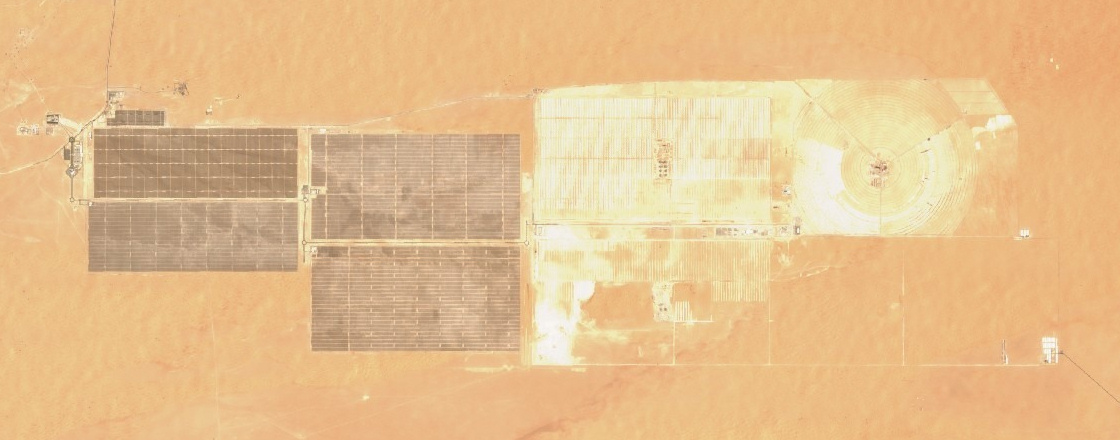
- Country: United Arab Emirates
- Location: Seih Al-Dahal, Dubai
- Coordinates: 24.7547°N 55.365°E
- Construction began: 2012
- Commission date: 22 October 2013 (first phase)
- Owner: Dubai Electricity and Water Authority (DEWA)
- Operator: ACWA Power

Solar farm
- Type: Combined PV and CSP plant
- Site resource: 2150 kWh/(m^{2}, yr)
- Site area: 77 square kilometres (30 mi^{2})

Power generation
- Units operational: 2,860 MW_{p}
- Units under const.: 1,800 MW_{p}
- Nameplate capacity: 1,313 MW; 5 GW
- Capacity factor: 24.6%
- Annual net output: appr. ~2800 GWh/yr

External links
- Commons: Related media on Commons

Mohammed bin Rashid Al Maktoum Solar Park is a solar park spread over a total area of 77 km^{2} (30 sq mi) in Saih Al-Dahal, about 50 km (31 mi) south of the city of Dubai in the United Arab Emirates (UAE).

It is one of the world's largest renewable projects based on an independent power producer (IPP) model. Besides solar farms using PV technology, the project includes concentrating solar power (CSP), with the total capacity of the entire project planned to reach more than 4,000 megawatts. It is estimated that the park will be generating 5,000 megawatts of renewable energy by 2030.

The plant was implemented by the Dubai Electricity and Water Authority (DEWA). The first phase of the project was commissioned on 22 October 2013. At the end of 2020 the solar PV complex reached a generating capacity of 1.013 GW with the aim to reach 5GW by 2030. The 4th (700 MW CSP + 250 MW PV, known as Noor Energy 1) and 5th phase (900 MW PV) are under construction.

The 200-megawatt second phase of the project drew global attention as the winning bid of the tender set a new record-low tariff of only US ¢5.89 per kilowatt-hour. This is about 20% lower than any previous, unsubsidized power purchase agreement (PPA) the world has seen before. The PPA is set to a 25-year time frame.

Thanks to a storage capacity of up to 15 hours, the plant can produce power day and night.

== History ==
The solar park was announced by Mohammed bin Rashid Al Maktoum in January 2012.

=== Phase 1 ===
The first phase of the park was a 13 MW_{p} solar farm (DEWA 13) constructed by First Solar. It was commissioned on 22 October 2013. It uses 152,880 FS-385 black CdTe modules and generates about 28 GWh per year which corresponds to a capacity factor of 24.6%.

=== Phase 2 ===
The second phase is a 200 MW_{p} photovoltaic plant built at a cost of US$320 million by a consortium led by ACWA Power and Spanish company TSK. The second phase was scheduled to be commissioned by April 2017. It was completed ahead of time, and commissioned on 22 March 2017. TSK served as the primary contractor for the project, while ACWA Power will operate the plant. The phase includes 2.3 million photovoltaic solar panels spread over an area of 4.5 km^{2}. ACWA Power secured a 27-year debt financing loan worth $344 million from the First Gulf Bank, the National Commercial Bank and the Samba Financial Group. The plant uses First Solar's CdTe modules.

The 200 MW_{p} second phase of the project caused worldwide attention, as the winning bid of the tender set a new record-low tariff of only US ¢5.89 per kilowatt-hour. This is about 20% lower than any previous, unsubsidized power purchase agreement (PPA) the world has seen before. The PPA is set to a 25-year time frame. Assuming the same capacity factor as for phase 1 (24.6%) the annual production will be approximately 430 GWh/yr.

=== Phase 3 ===
In April 2015, Dubai Electricity and Water Authority (DEWA) publicly announced the third phase of 800 MW_{p}. A consortium led by Abu Dubai Future Energy Company (Masdar) was awarded the contract for phase three in June 2016. The third phase was completed in 2020.

=== Phase 4 (Noor Energy 1) ===
The characteristics of the 4th phase of the solar park changed several times during its conception. Originally, DEWA released a request for the Expression of Interest (EOI) for a 200 MW_{e} CSP project in October 2016 and announced the winning bid at 9.45 US cents/kWh purchase price in June 2017. Three months later in September 2017 the final project was revealed at 700 MW_{e} consisting of 600 MW_{e} parabolic trough and a 100 MW_{e} solar power tower both featuring large molten-salt thermal energy storage, while pointing out the record breaking purchase price of 7.30 US cents/kWh. However, analysts highlight that factors such as very low financing cost and an extraordinary long 35-year PPA contributed to this very low figure. Later in 2018 it was announced that 250 MW of solar PV would be added to the project now named Noor Energy 1.

The solar power tower is the tallest in the world, standing at 260 m (850 ft). The Noor Energy 1 solar complex will have 15 hours of energy storage capacity, and be able to deliver power 24 hours a day. It boasts of being "the largest single-site concentrated solar power plant in the world". It uses the technology known as concentrated solar thermal power, or CSP. Mirrors are used to concentrate the sun's rays, which are then beamed into the tower, which acts as a receptor. The plant is also the largest CSP in the world. It Noor Energy 1 covers 44 km^{2} (17 sq mi). Apart from the tower, there are three other units, all 200-megawatt parabolic trough CSP units. Together these additional units generate 600 megawatts of electricity in the daytime and continue for 12 hours at night. Noor Energy 1 is able to deliver a gigawatt of power in total.

Noor Energy 1 cost US$3.8 billion to construct, but there are no ongoing fuel costs to consider.

=== Phase 5 ===
On 21 November 2019, DEWA announced the selection of ACWA Power and Gulf Investment Corporation as preferred EPC and financer respectively, to build and operate the fifth phase, a 900 MW solar power plant based on photovoltaic technology. The plant is scheduled to be commissioned in 2021.

=== Phase 6 ===
DEWA awarded a contract for the sixth phase with 1,800 MW to Masdar in August 2023 with a bid price of $US16.24/MWh.

=== Phase by phase project execution table ===
Phase	Capacity	Technology	Commissioned	IPP	Cost
First	13 MW	photovoltaic	2013		
Second	200 MW	photovoltaic	April 2017	ACWA Power & TSK	US$320 million
Third	Stage 1: 200 MW Stage 2: 300 MW Stage 3: 300 MW	photovoltaic	May 2018 2019 2020	Masdar & EDF Group	US$945 million
Fourth	Stage 1: 600 MW Stage 2: 100 MW Stage 3: 217 MW	parabolic trough solar power tower photovoltaic	Dec 2023 2021 2021		US$3.8 billion
Fifth	Stage 1: 330 MW Stage 2: 600 MW	photovoltaic	August 2021 June 2023	ACWA Power & GIC	US$545 million
Sixth	1,800 MW	photovoltaic	2024–2026 (expected)	Masdar	US$1.5 billion
Total	4,660 MW				US$7.11 billion

== See also ==
- Solar power in the United Arab Emirates
