= Saih Al-Dahal =

Community in the Emirates of Dubai

Saih Al-Dahal Seih Al-Dahal
- Community
- Interactive map of Saih Al-Dahal
- Coordinates: 24.7547°N 55.365°E
- Country: UAE
- Emirate: Dubai

Population (2014)
  - Total: 2

Languages
  - Official: Arabic
- Time zone: UTC+4:00 (UAE Standard Time)
- Community number: 971

Saih Al-Dahal (Community: 971) is a small bedouin community located 50 km south of Dubai, United Arab Emirates. It is the location where Mohammed bin Rashid Al Maktoum Solar Park has been commissioned in 2013 by Dubai Electricity and Water Authority.

The location (of the community) has a very less population density and further testing showed the lowest accumulation of dust and smaller particle surface area which directly reduces the spectral soiling losses in case of solar power plants.

== Gallery ==
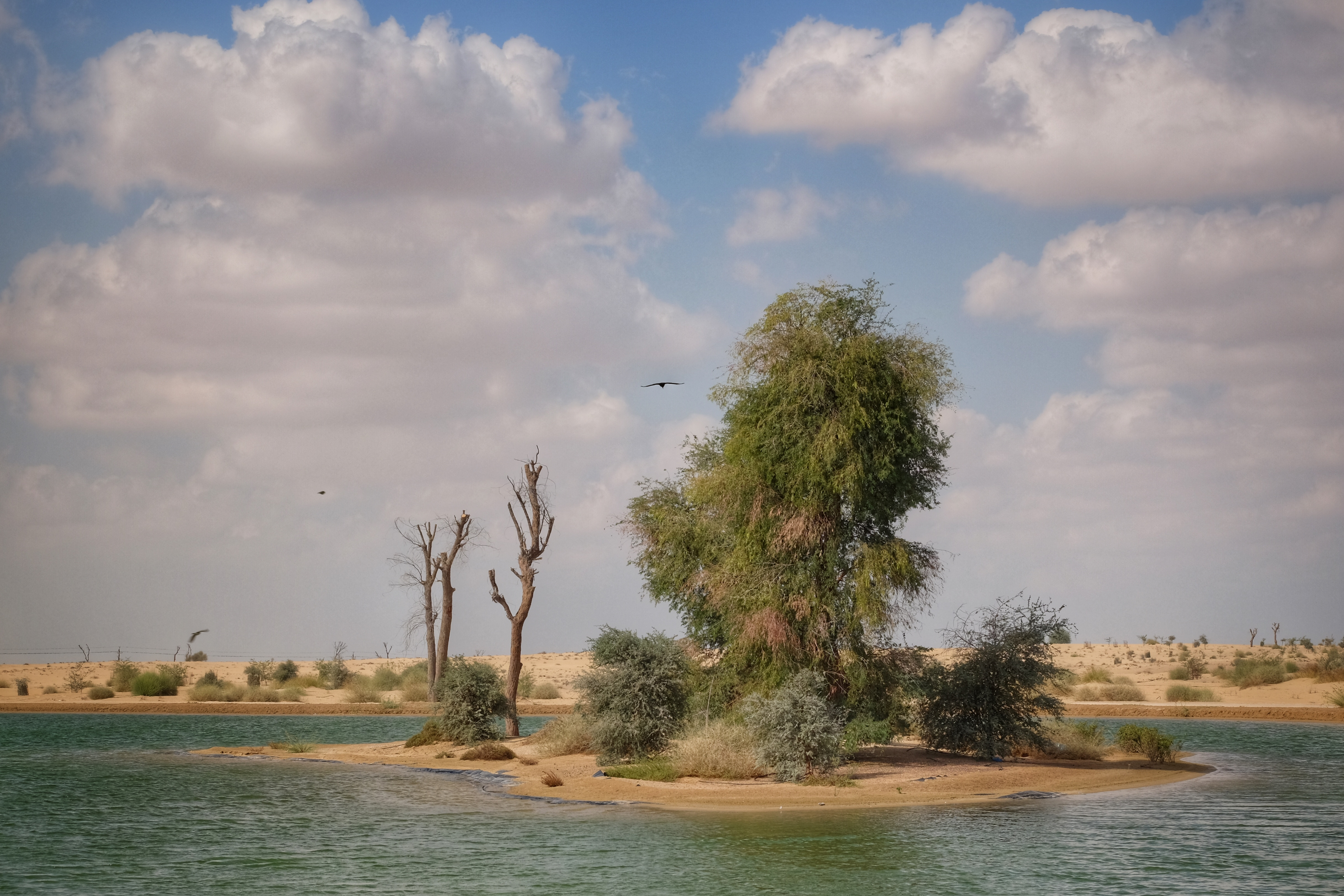
Temporary desert lake after the heavy rainfall in Saih Al-Dahal

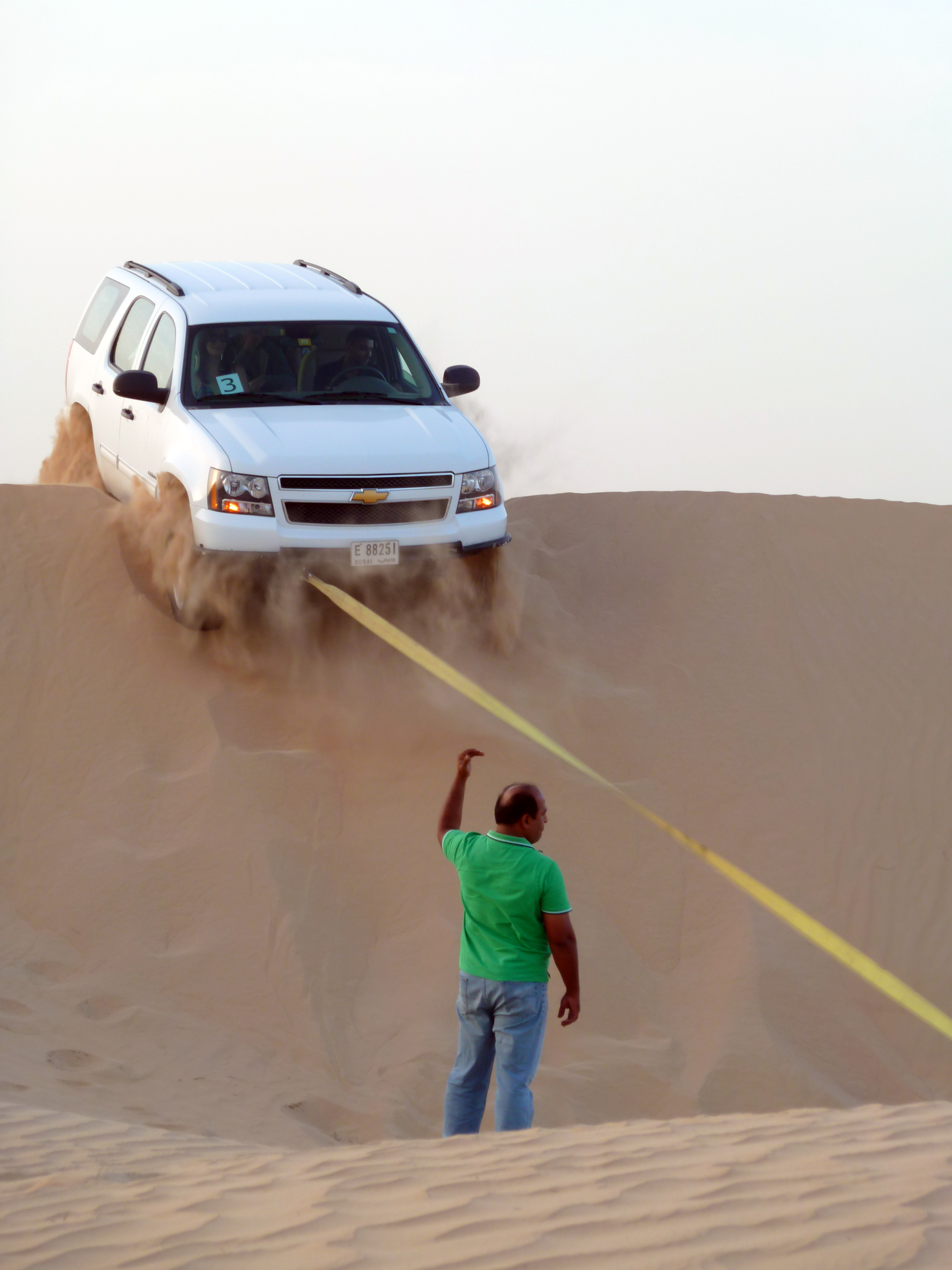
Desert safari at Saih Al-Dahal

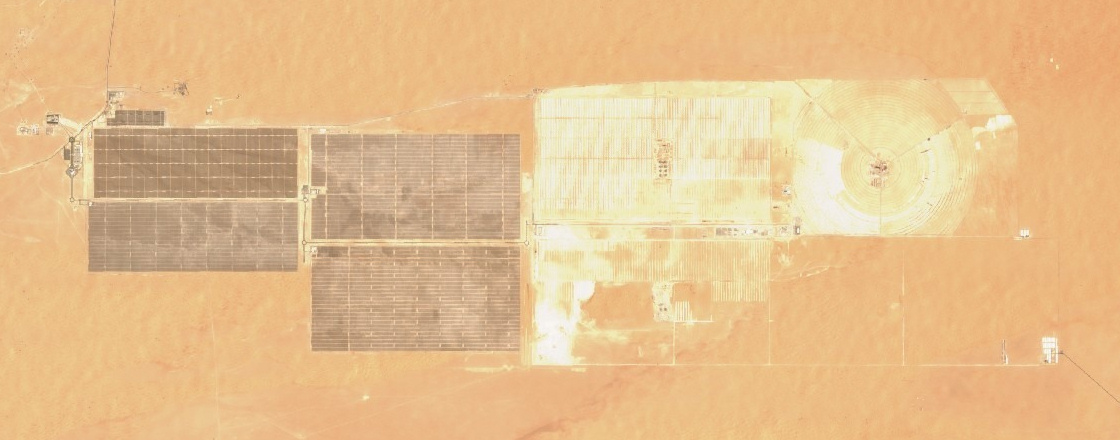
Satellite image of Mohammed bin Rashid Al Maktoum Solar Park taken over Saih Al-Dahal

== See also ==
- Mohammed bin Rashid Al Maktoum Solar Park
