= Hatta Fort Hotel =

JA Hatta Fort Hotel
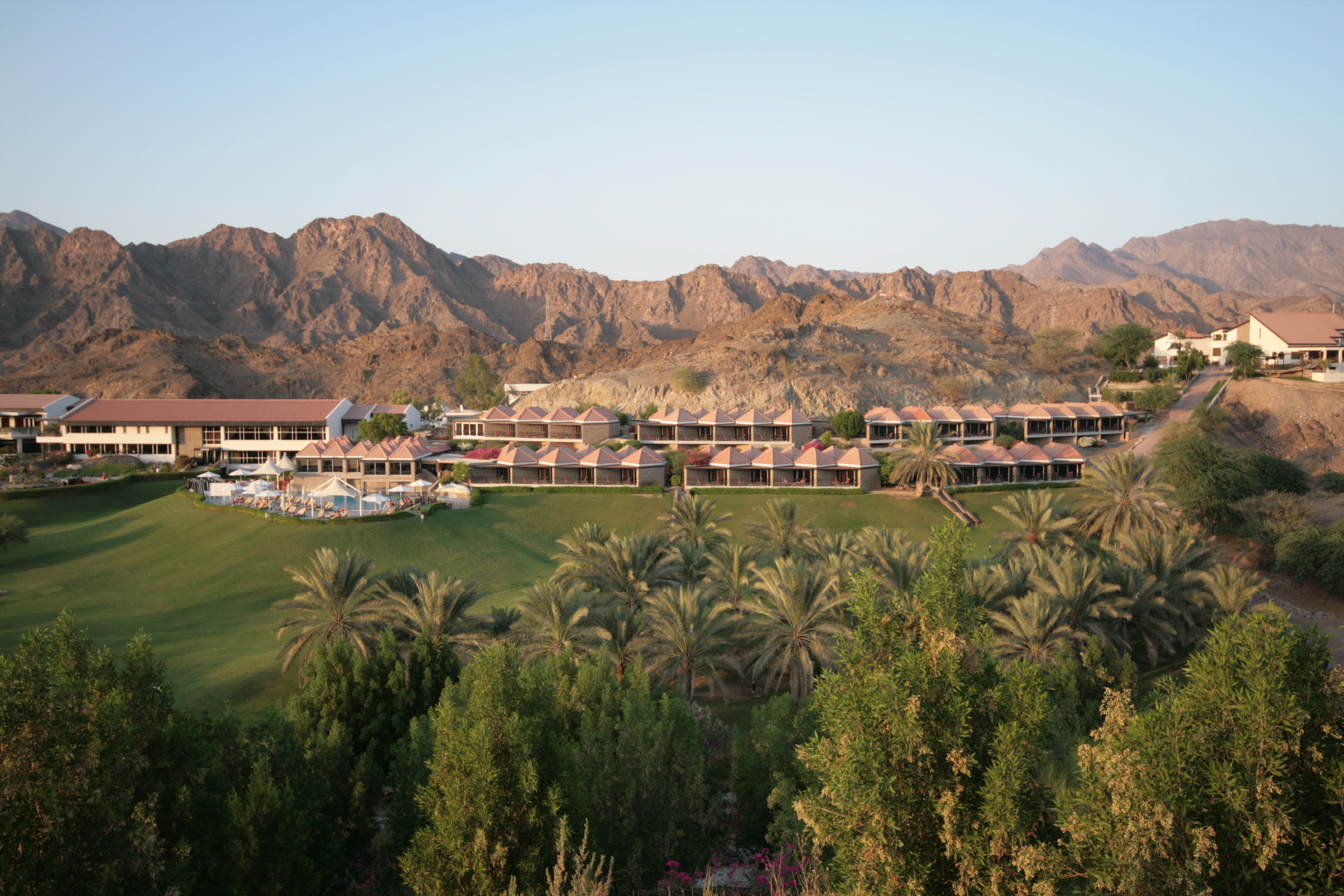
- Interactive map of the JA Hatta Fort Hotel area
- Hotel chain: JA Resorts & Hotels

General information
- Location: Hatta, Dubai
- Coordinates: 24.8193°N 56.1333°E
- Opening: 1981
- Owner: Dutco
- Operator: JA Resorts & Hotels

Technical details
- Floor count: 2

Other information
- Number of rooms: 50
- Number of suites: 2

Website
- JA Hatta Fort Hotel

The JA Hatta Fort Hotel is a small four-star resort hotel in the United Arab Emirates, located in the Dubai exclave of Hatta in the Hajar Mountains, some 90 minutes from the city of Dubai. The hotel consists of chalet-style rooms lined by pathways to the main building, which houses a small spa, reception, the Jeema Restaurant and the Roumoul Bar. It also has two villa suites (each containing two rooms and a Jacuzzi) and a larger private villa for hire. The hotel is located within some 80 acres of gardens and grounds.

Benefiting from the more temperate mountain climate compared to the UAE's low-lying areas, the Hatta Fort Hotel is a popular weekend break location and a frequent destination for motorcycle groups such as the Dubai Chapter of the Harley Owner's Group (HOG).

== Facilities ==
The hotel has two swimming pools, one adjacent to the main building and one located in the gardens which is opened to day visitors and families with children. It also has an archery range, skeet shooting, a crazy golf course and a mini golf course. The hotel can organise sightseeing trips and also offers a Winnebago camper for rental.

== History ==
The JA Hatta Fort today maintains some of the features and original decor dating back to its opening (by Sheikh Rashid bin Saeed Al Maktoum) in 1981, giving it a somewhat eclectic 'retro' charm. A refurbishment of the hotel in early 2017 saw some of the original features of the hotel lost.

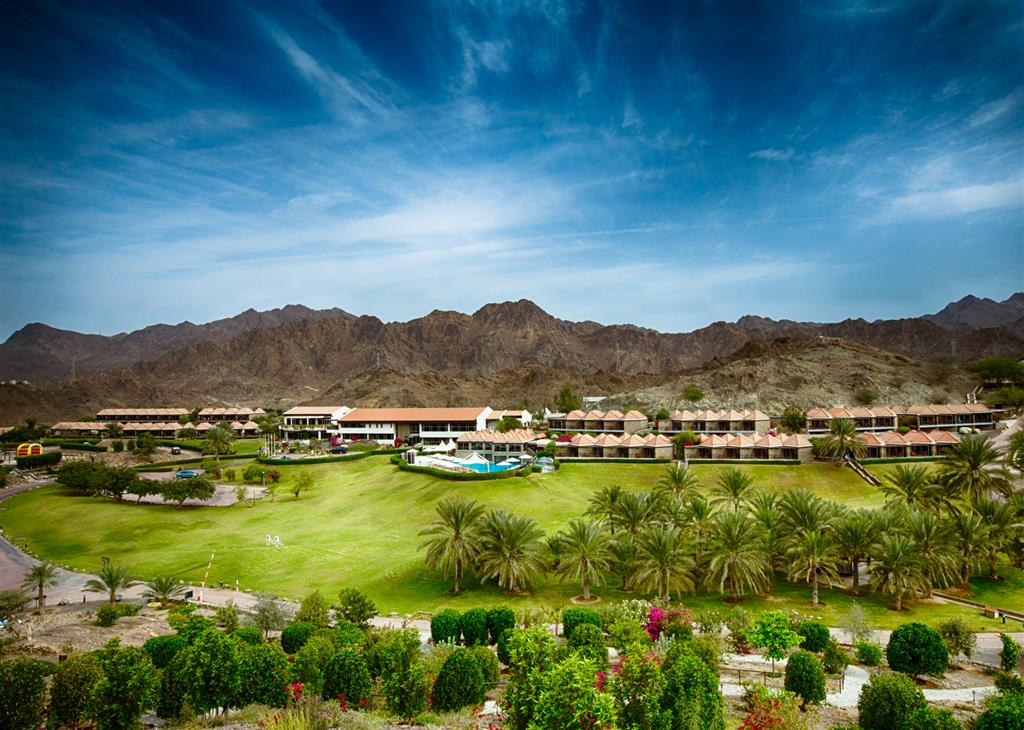
Hatta Fort Hotel

The hotel was designed by architect Ajai Saran for owners Dutco.
