= Hatta Heritage Village =

Coordinates: 24°47′48″N 56°07′03″E

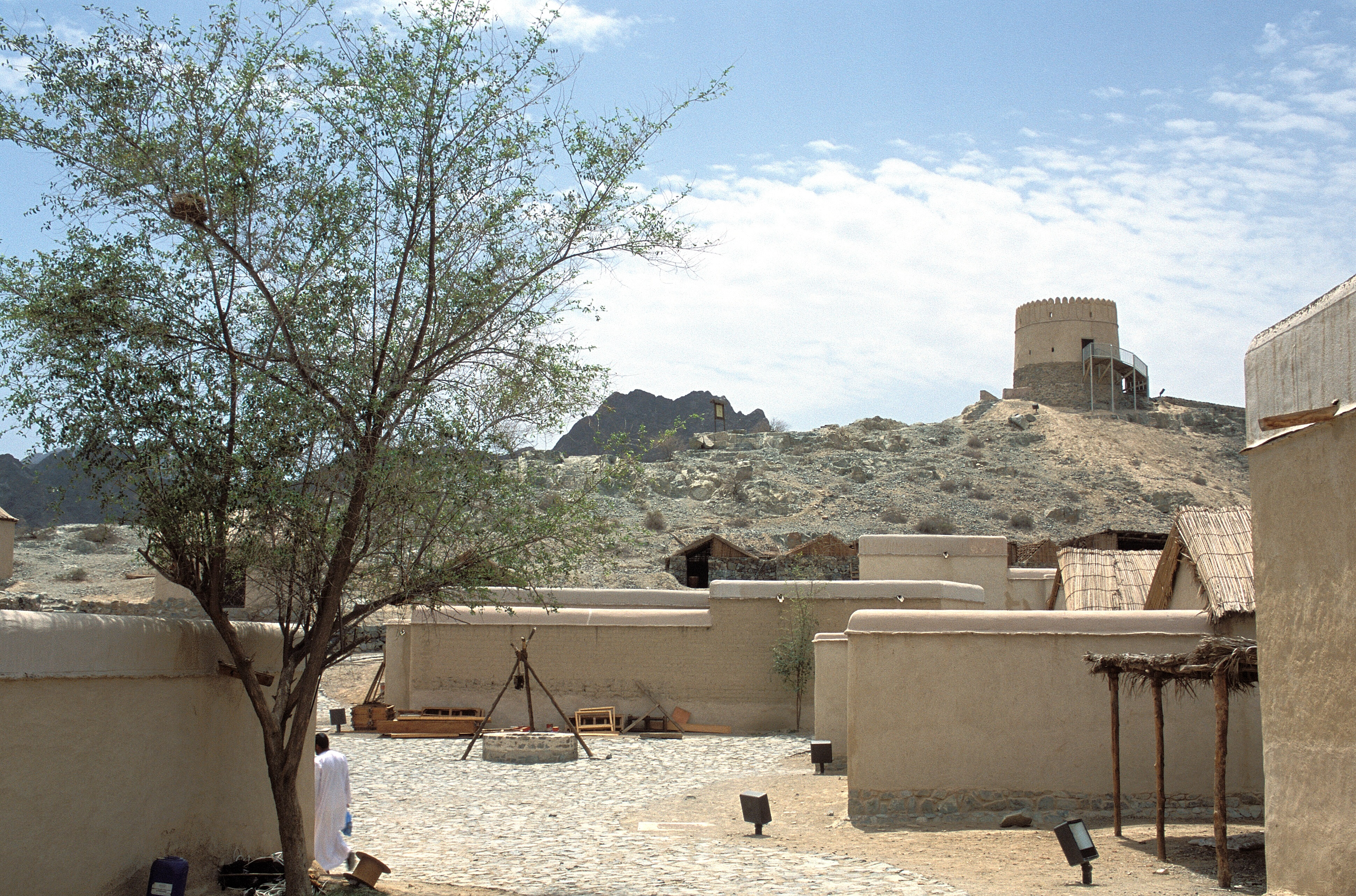
Hatta Heritage Village

Hatta Heritage Village is a reconstruction of a traditional mountain village located in Hatta, in the Al Hajar Mountains, Dubai, United Arab Emirates (UAE).

The mosque and houses within Hatta Heritage Village were originally constructed from materials such as mud, palm tree trunks and fronds (barasti), reeds, and stone. The village consists of 30 buildings, many of which have interior furnishings typical of the UAE in the period prior to development in the 1960s onwards.

The village was opened to the public in February 2001 after extensive renovation, and is currently owned and managed by the Dubai Culture & Arts Authority.
