= Shams Solar Power Station =

Concentrating solar power plant

Shams I
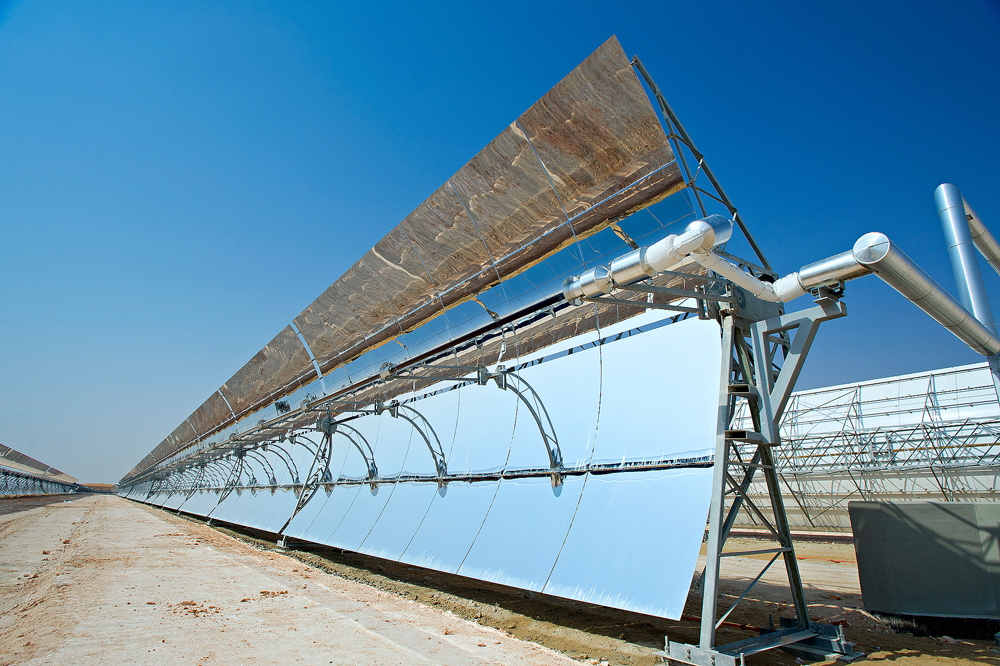
- Shams 1 Parabolic Trough in Abu Dhabi
- Country: United Arab Emirates
- Location: Madinat Zayed, Abu Dhabi
- Coordinates: 23°34′10″N 53°42′50″E
- Status: Operational
- Construction began: July 2010
- Commission date: 17 March 2013
- Construction cost: US$600 million
- Owners: Masdar (60%); Abengoa Solar (20%); Total S.A. (20%)

Solar farm
- Type: CSP
- CSP technology: Parabolic trough
- Collectors: 768
- Site resource: 1,934 kWh/m^{2}/yr
- Site area: 2.5 km^{2} (1 sq mi)

Power generation
- Units operational: 1
- Nameplate capacity: 100 MW
- Annual net output: 210 GWh

External links
- Commons: Related media on Commons

Shams Solar Power Station (Arabic: شمس, lit. 'Sun') is a concentrating solar power station near Madinat Zayed, Abu Dhabi, the United Arab Emirates. The solar power station is located approximately 120 kilometres (75 mi) southwest of Abu Dhabi and 6 kilometres (4 mi) from Madinat Zayed on the road from Tarif to the Liwa Oasis.

The Shams station is planned to eventually include 3 plants: Shams 1 became operational on 17 March 2013. Using parabolic trough technology with a capacity of 100 megawatts (MW), Shams 1 was the largest concentrated solar power (CSP) facility in the world when it opened. Shams 1 will be followed by the Shams 2 and Shams 3 power plants. The website Shamspower describes the impact and sustainability factors of the solar power plant.

== Description ==
Parabolic trough

Shams 1 is a 100 MW concentrating solar power station which uses parabolic trough technology. It displaces 175,000 tons of CO_{2} per year and its power output is enough to power 20,000 homes. The station consists of 258,048 parabolic trough mirrors, 192 solar collector assembly loops with 8 solar collector assemblies per loop, 768 solar collector assembly units, and 27,648 absorber pipes. It covers an area of approximately 2.5 square kilometres (0.97 sq mi).

The basic and detailed engineering have been developed by AG Ingeniería. The project is consulted by Fichtner Consulting Engineers. The equipment is designed and delivered by Foster Wheeler. The power station is equipped by Abengoa Solar's ASTRO collectors. The 125 MW steam turbine is provided by MAN Turbo, parabolic glass mirrors are provided by Flabeg, PTR 70 absorber tubes are provided by Schott AG, and Therminol heat transfer fluid is provided by Solutia.

In October 2010 it was reported that because of "substantial" atmospheric dust, solar radiation received by Shams' solar collectors was less than expected and more collectors would be required.

=== Technical specifications ===
- Solar-Field Aperture Area: 627,840 m^{2}
- Number of Loops: 192
- Number of SCAs per Loop: 4
- SCA Length: 150 m
- Number of Modules per SCA: 12
- SCA Manufacturer (Model): Abengoa Solar (ASTRO)
- Mirror Manufacturer (Model): Flabeg (RP3)
- Number of Heat Collector Elements (HCEs): 27,648
- HCE Manufacturer (Model): Schott (PTR 70)
- Heat-Transfer Fluid Type: Therminol VP-1
- HTF Company: Solutia
- Solar-Field Inlet Temp: 300°
- Solar-Field Outlet Temp: 400°
- Turbine Manufacturer: MAN
- Output Type: Steam Rankine
- Cooling Method: Dry cooling
- Fossil Backup Type: Natural Gas Boiler

== Developer ==
The project is developed by the Shams Power Company, a special purpose vehicle of Abu Dhabi Future Energy Company (Masdar) in cooperation with Spain's Abengoa Solar and France's Total S.A. Masdar has 60% in the project while Abengoa Solar and Total S.A. each have 20%. The power station is developed under a 25-year build, own and operate contract. Bids to build and operate the power station were made by several international consortia. In addition to Abengoa Solar and Total S.A., Saudi Arabia's ACWA Power and Spain's Iberdrola, Germany's MAN Ferrostaal and Solar Millennium, and Spain's Grupo Cobra and Grupo Sener made their bids.

== Financing ==
The construction cost of Shams 1 is about US$600 million. The project is financed by 10 regional and international lenders including BNP Paribas, the National Bank of Abu Dhabi and Société Générale.

== See also ==
- List of solar thermal power stations
