= Hatta, United Arab Emirates =

Hatta حتا Hajarain
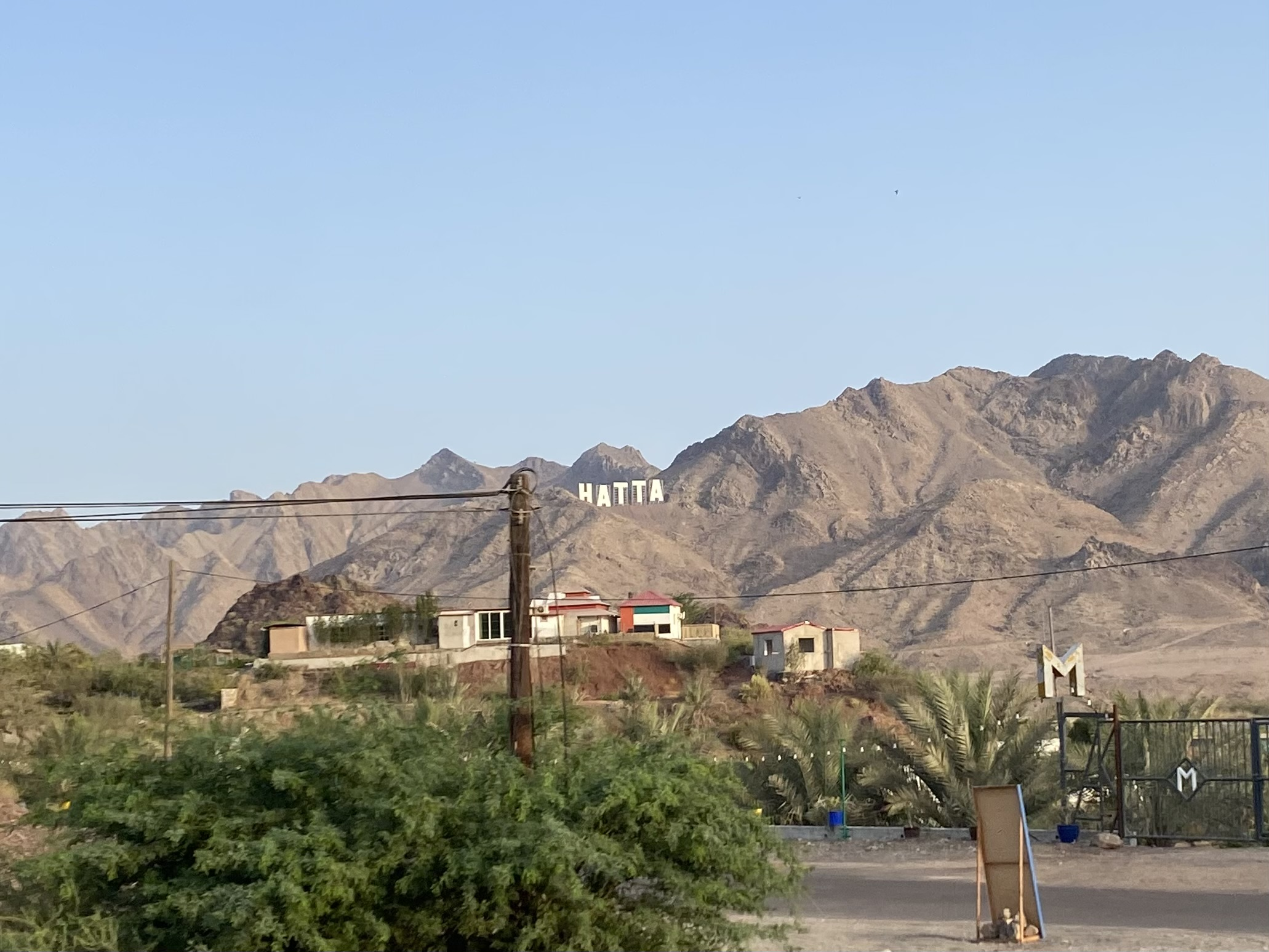
- The Hatta sign with the Al Hajar Mountains in the background
- Interactive map of Hatta
- Location within United Arab Emirates
- Coordinates: 24°47′48″N 56°07′03″E
- Country: United Arab Emirates
- Emirate: Dubai

Area
  - Total: 140 km^{2} (54 sq mi)
- Elevation: 330 m (1,080 ft)

Population (2018)
  - Total: 13,295

Hatta (Arabic: حتا locally [ˈħɑttɐ]) is an inland exclave of the emirate of Dubai in the United Arab Emirates.

== Geography ==
It lies to the south-east of Dubai's main territory and is about 134 km (83 mi) east of Dubai. It is located relatively high in the Hajar Mountains. It borders Oman to the east and the south, the Ajman exclave of Masfout to the west, and Ras Al Khaimah to the north.

== History ==
Formerly, known as Hajarain, Hatta became a dependency of Dubai during the reign of Hasher Bin Maktoum. The village was still called Hajarain as recently as 1906.

The old village of Hatta includes two prominent military towers from the 1880s, a fort from 1896 and the Juma mosque, which was built in 1780 and is the oldest building in Hatta. Some ancestral burial chambers from the Hafit period (3200-2500BC) can be found in the east part of the village. Some were completely renovated and rebuilt. The traditional water supply was through the falaj system, which has also been restored. Nestled in the mountains, this haven has traditionally served as summer retreat for Dubai-based families escaping the heat and humidity of the coastland trying new outdoor activities.

Since the early 1980s, Hatta was a popular vacation destination for western expatriates and local families alike for 'wadi bashing' through the tracks between Hatta, Mahdah and Al Ain. These tracks are now closed following the formalisation of the Omani border.

== Economy ==
Hatta's main economic factor is tourism and water. Historically the area was able to grow date palms; the fruits were used as a food source, while the tree was used for building material. It has a popular heritage village, including a collection of reconstructed traditional mountain dwellings and is popular for weekend getaways with both people camping in the winter months or staying at the Hatta Fort Hotel, which is located only 2.7 km (1.7 mi) away from Hatta Dam.

Hatta Dam was built in 1990s to supply the area with electricity and water. Hatta Kayak is a popular tourist destination and a favourite spot for kayaking in UAE. Dubai Electricity and Water Authority (DEWA) is constructing a 250 MW pumped-storage hydroelectricity (with an energy storage capacity of 1,500MWh or 6 hours) at Hatta using 880 million gallons of water 300 metres (980 ft) above a lower dam.

== Development ==
On November 8th, 2016, Sheikh Mohammed bin Rashid Al Maktoum announced a DH 1.3 billion plan to turn the mountain city of Hatta into a world-class tourist destination, with over 40 projects in economic, social and cultural sectors. The plan included 400 homes for Emiratis in Hatta, green areas for winter sports and a mountain track circuit. The plan aims to encourage the youth to start their own businesses under the supervision of the Mohammed bin Rashid Al Maktoum Knowledge Foundation.

== Sports ==
It is home to prominent football team Hatta Club. Since 2009, the Dubai Sports Council has been actively working to revitalize Hatta Beach with sports and outdoor activities, such as hiking, yoga, rowing, paddling, and kayaking, to associate the area with such activities.

It also has a network of mountain biking routes of various grades that cater for beginners, intermediate and advanced cyclists.

== Climate ==
Due to Hatta's higher altitude, its climate is much cooler than central Dubai. Hatta has an arid landscape and temperature, reaching 55 degrees Celsius in the summer; however, it is less humid than Dubai and far colder in the winter.

== Tourist sites in Hatta ==
=== Hatta Heritage Village ===
Hatta Heritage Village is located in the center of the city of Hatta. It is the ancient original village of the residents of the region. Dubai Municipality restored it and made it a heritage masterpiece of a very high standard. Hatta Village attracts tourists on a daily basis and throughout the week, and the village also holds celebrations during the Dubai Shopping Festival. The village displays the customs and traditions of the people of the region and it flourishes with foreigners visiting on weekends.

Hatta Castles: There are two old castles on the outskirts of the heritage village. These castles were to protect and guard the area. These castles have been restored, and there is a pathway to reach them.

Valleys and dams: There are two dams in this region, one of which is the largest in the Middle East. These dams work to preserve groundwater in the region. There are also valleys such as Wadi Al-Qahfi (belonging to the Sultanate of Oman), famous for its many Arab and foreign visitors, Wadi Al-Hatawi, and Wadi Al-Ghubra.

Al Tallah Park: Al Tallah Park is located in the center of Hatta. It is one of the most visited parks and is crowded on weekends and on official holidays. Young people can also participate in sports activities. A swimming pool is also available for those who love this sport.

== Gallery ==
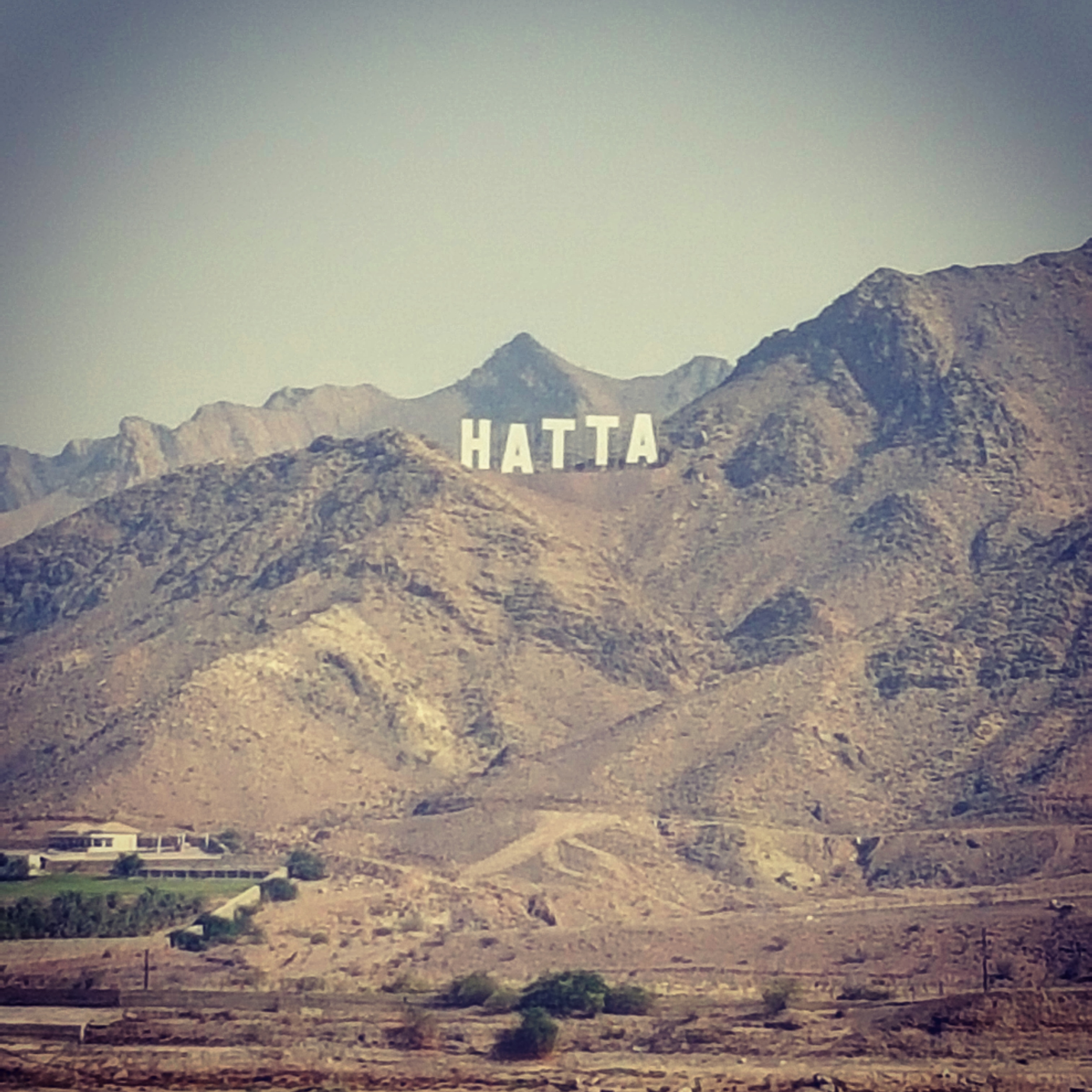
The sign in the rocks at Hatta

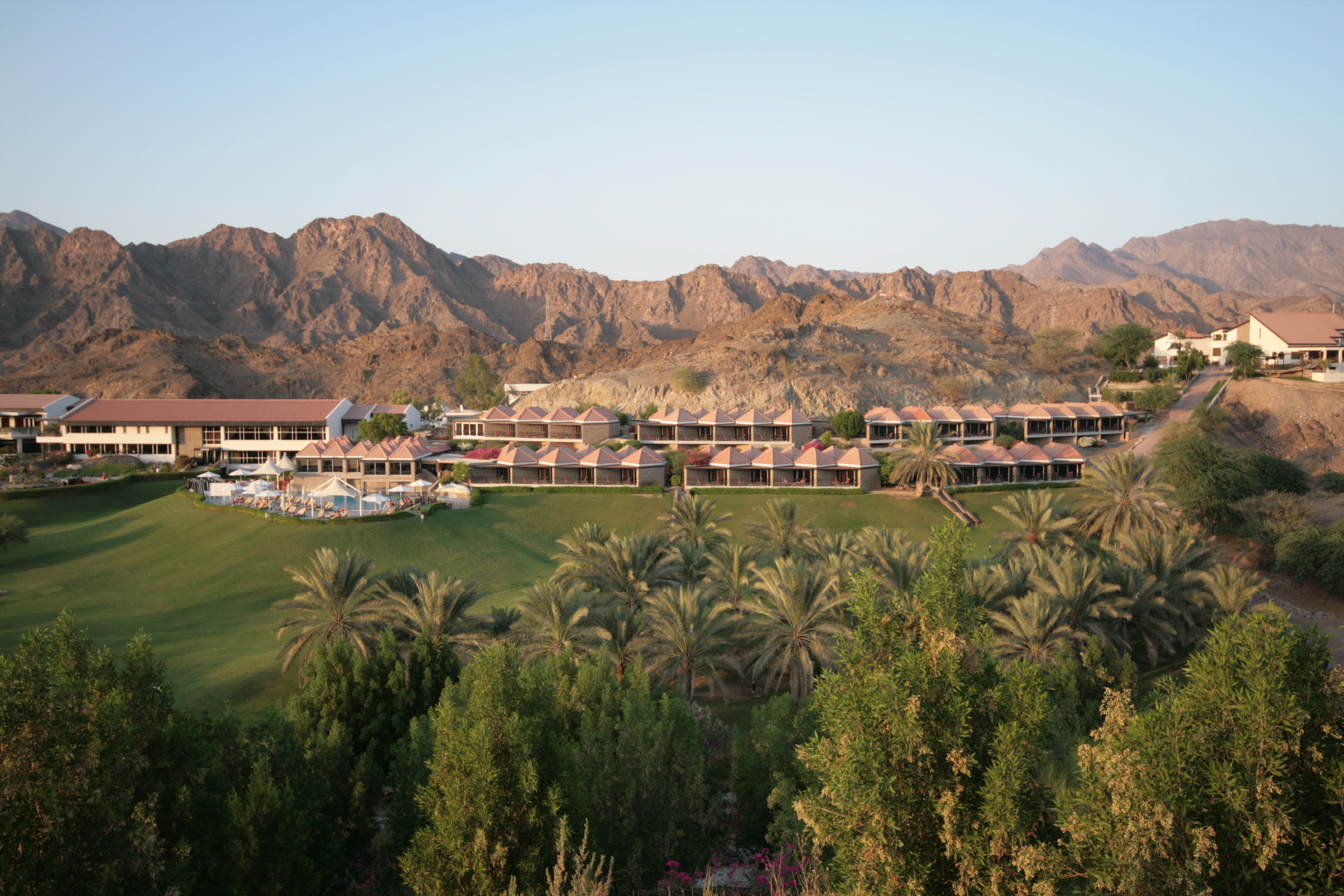
Hatta Fort Hotel

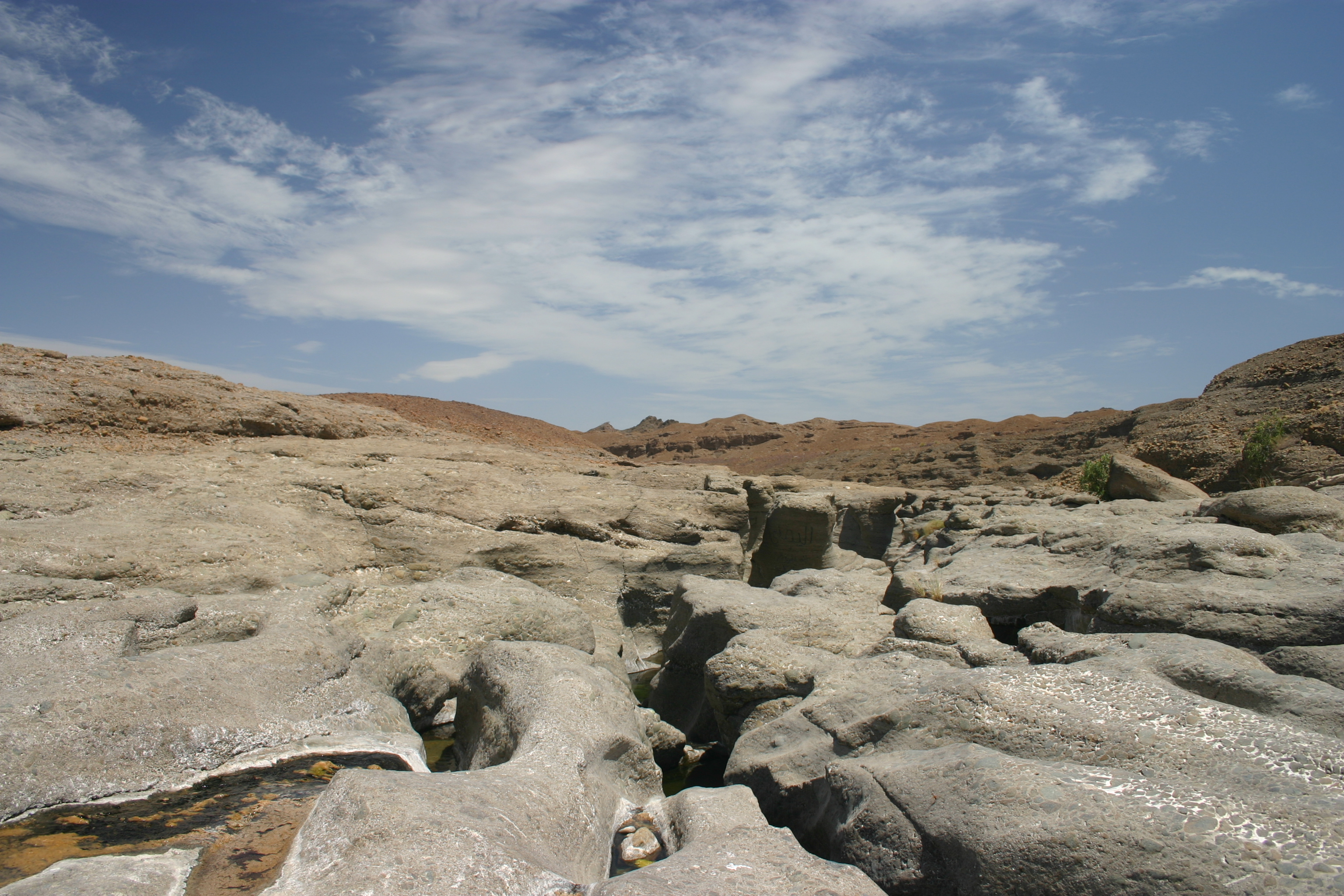
Hatta pools

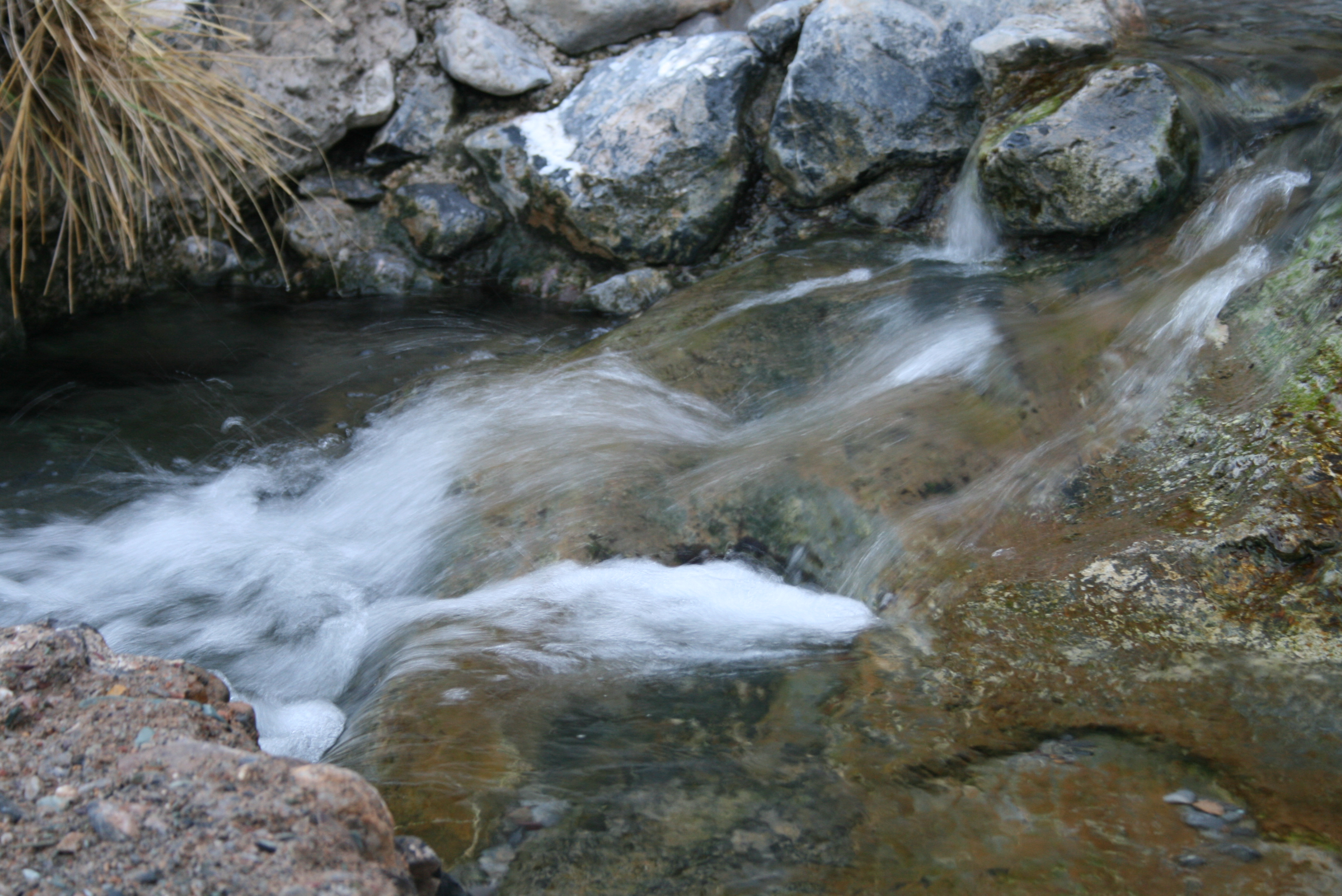
Spring water in Hatta

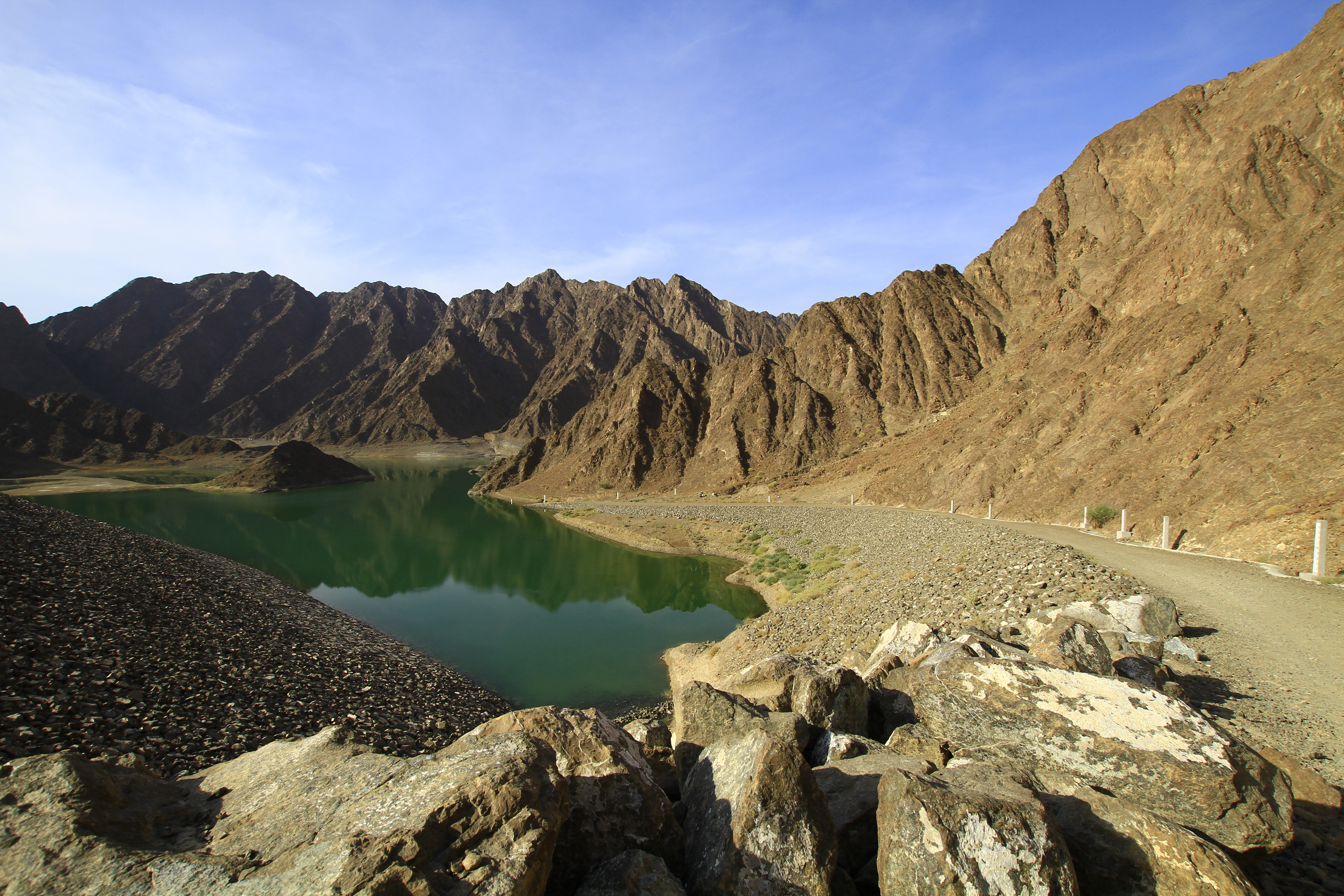
Hatta Dam

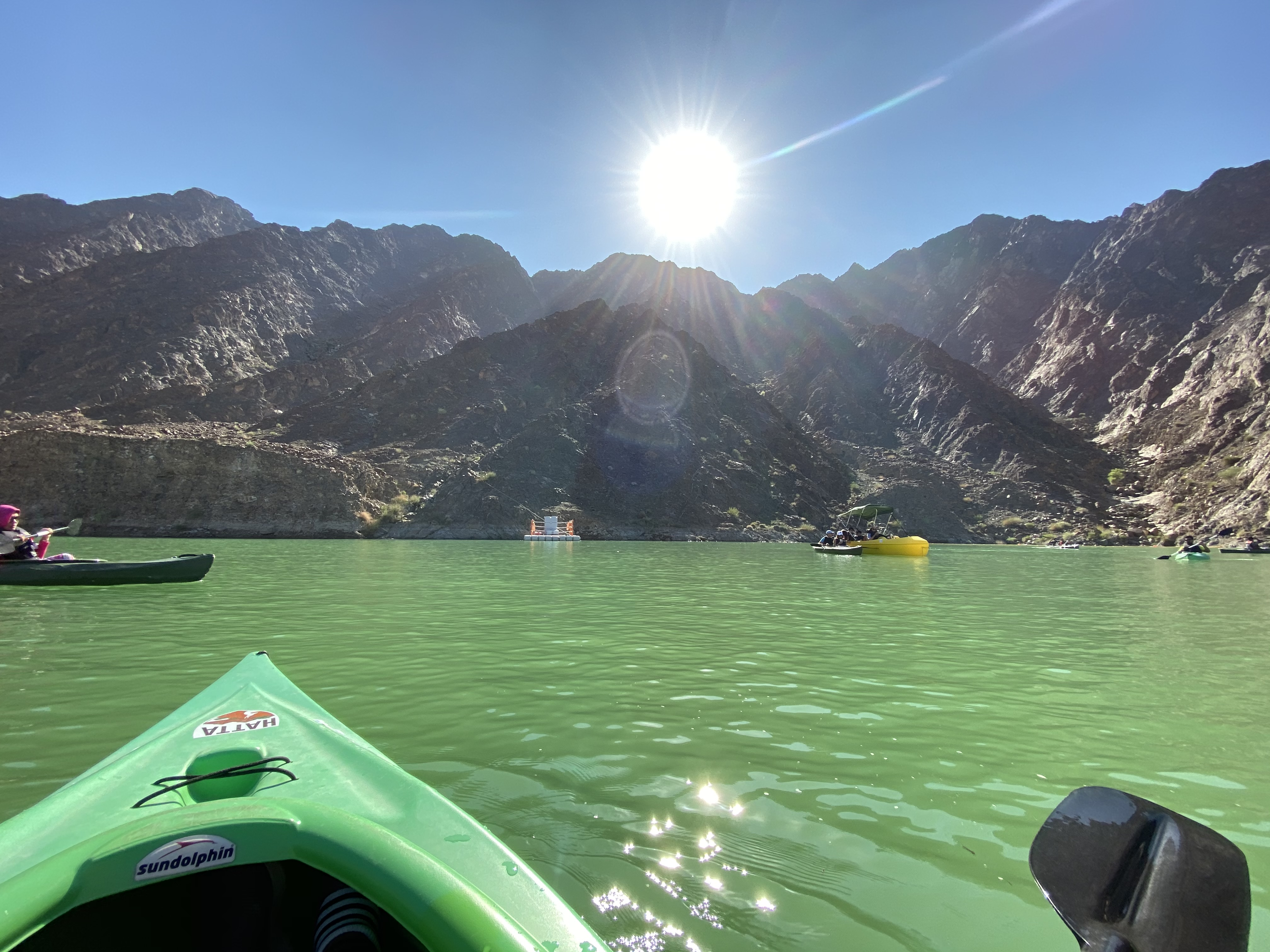
Hatta Dam Kayaking

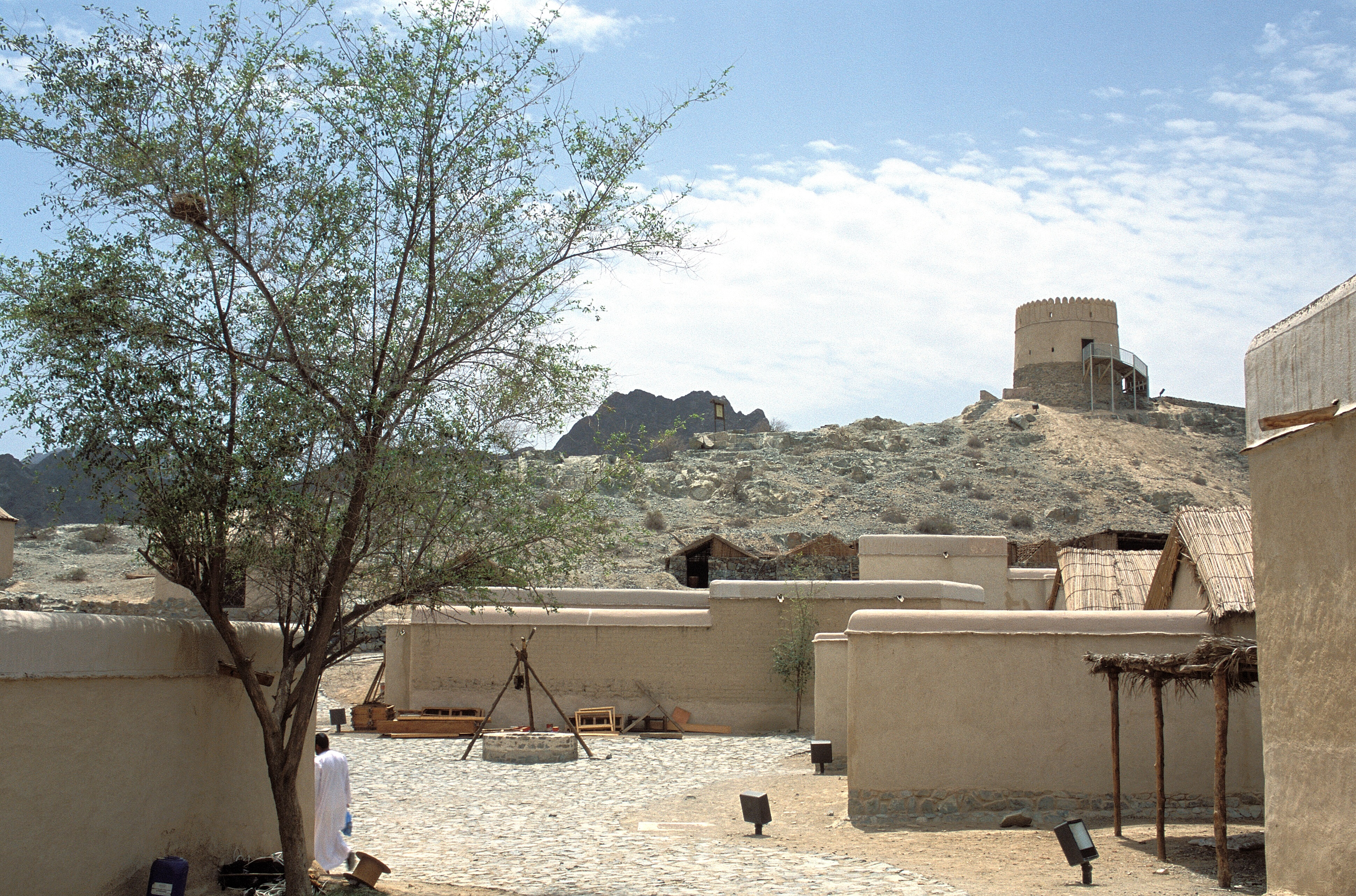
Hatta Heritage Village

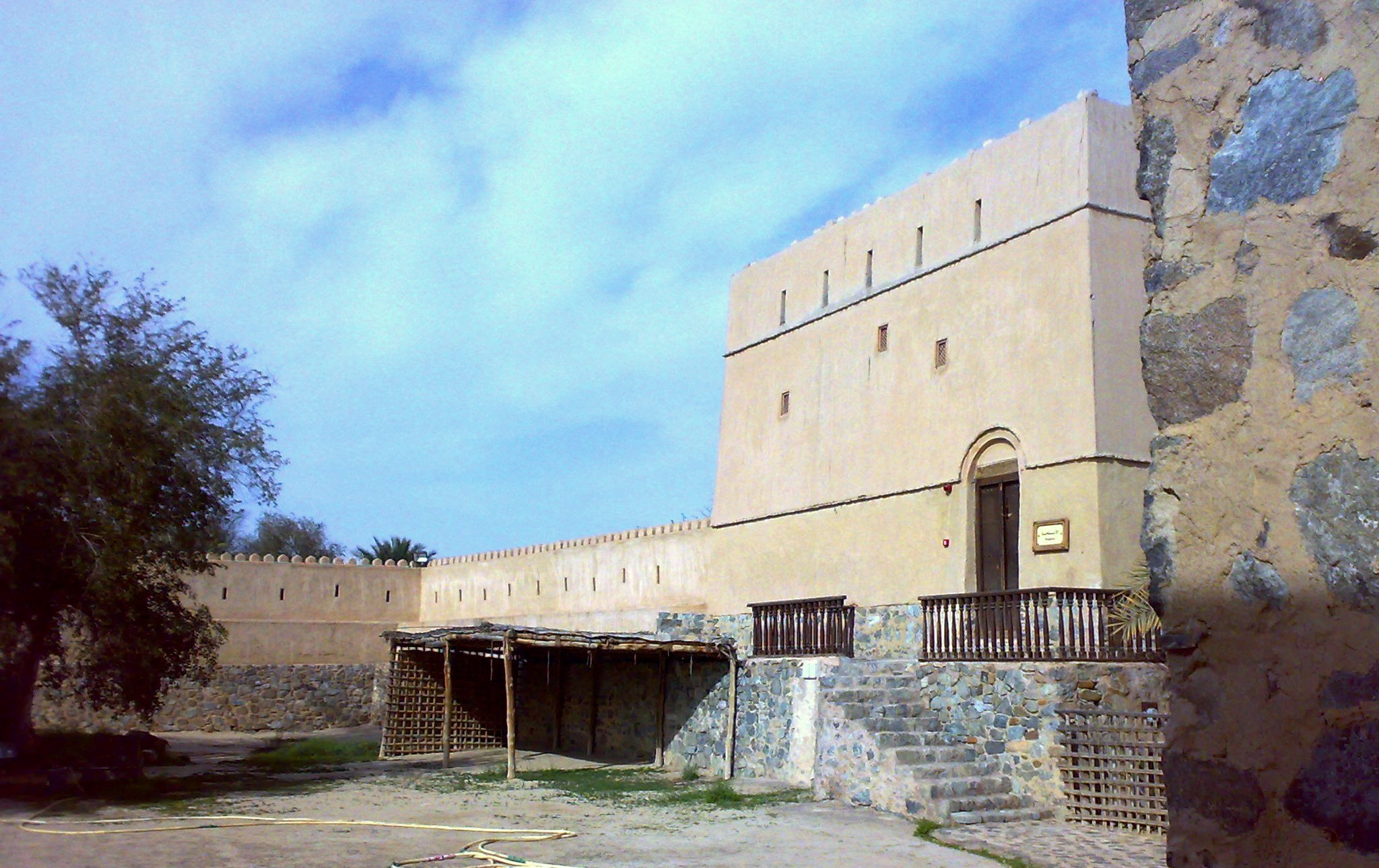
Hatta Fort

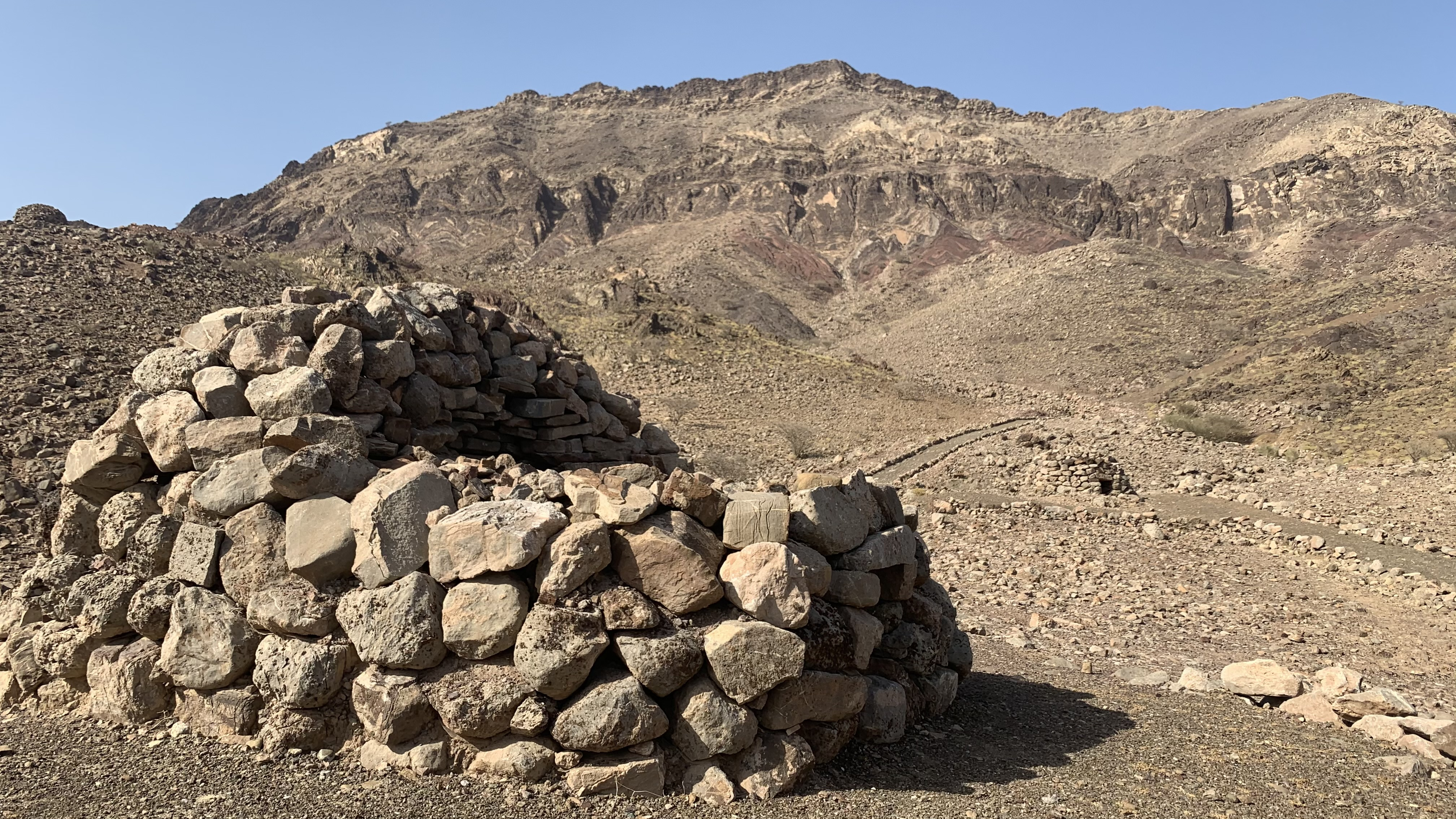
Hatta Grave
