= ACWA Power =

Saudi power generation and desalinated water production organization

- Type: Public
- Industry: Electricity
- Founded: 2004
- Headquarters: Riyadh, Saudi Arabia
- Key people: Mohammad Abdullah Abunayyan (Chairman); Raad Al-Saady (Vice Chairman and Managing Director); Marco Arcelli (Chief Executive Officer)
- Products: Electric power water
- Number of employees: 4,000
- Website: acwapower.com

Acwa (formerly ACWA Power) is a developer, investor, co-owner and operator of a portfolio of power generation and desalinated water production plants with a presence in 14 countries across the Middle East, Africa, and Central and Southeast Asia. Acwa's portfolio of projects in operation and development has an investment value of USD 107.5 billion, and a capacity of 78.85 GW of power and produces 9.5 million m3 /day of desalinated water.

Its energy portfolio includes thermal power plants, solar power plants (photovoltaic (PV) and concentrated solar power (CSP)), wind, water desalination plants, and green hydrogen projects.

== Background ==
Headquartered in Saudi Arabia, ACWA Power maintains regional offices in Riyadh, Jeddah, Dubai, Baku, Beijing, Cairo, Addis Abbaba, Jakarta, Amman, Rabat, Muscat, Johannesburg, Istanbul, Tashkent, and Hanoi. It invests in, develops, co-owns and operates a portfolio of +100 projects with the capacity of 98 GW of power and produce 9.5 million m3 /day of desalinated water. ACWA Power and its subsidiary operating companies employ around 4,000 people in projects in 14 different countries.

In January 2026, the company officially changed its trading name from ACWA Power to Acwa and unveiled a new brand identity. This rebranding marked the company’s transition from a regional Saudi Arabian developer to a global infrastructure platform managing over US$115 billion in assets across 15 countries. The refreshed identity is built around the "energy quadrilemma" of affordability, sustainability, security, and speed. Coinciding with the rebrand, Acwa announced a strategic goal to double its assets under management to US$250 billion by 2030, focusing on large-scale green hydrogen, next-generation desalination, and renewable energy storage.

== Structure ==
ACWA Power's board of directors is chaired by Mohammad Abdullah Abunayyan, with Raad Al Saady as its Vice Chairman and Managing Director, and Marco Arcelli as its CEO.

== History ==
In 2002, the Government of Saudi Arabia changed the regulations so that the private sector was permitted to own and operate utilities such as water and power plants. The company was originally founded in 2004 as ACWA Power Projects, a joint venture between ACWA Holding (representing the Abunayyan Holding Company and Al-Muhaidib, today known as Vision International Investment Company) and the MADA Group for Industrial and Commercial Development (today known as Al Rajhi Group Holding) to take advantage of these new private sector investment and operation opportunities in the Saudi Arabian market. The company was reorganised in 2008 in its current legal form as ACWA Power Company. From 2004 to 2011, ACWA Power focused primarily on Saudi Arabia, and was awarded contracts for several thermal power projects – including the Shuaibah IWPP, Shuqaiq 2 IWPP, Rabigh IPP and Marafiq IPP. The company began international expansion in 2011 with the acquisition of Central Electricity Generating Company (CEGCO) in Jordan, and the signature of a joint development agreement for the Kirikkale Combined Cycle Gas Turbine project in Turkey, which subsequently won backing from the European Bank for Reconstruction and Development (EBRD). Today, ACWA Power operates across 14 countries in the Middle East, Africa, Central Asia, and Southeast Asia, with a portfolio comprising renewable energy, water desalination, green hydrogen, and conventional energy projects.

In 2018, the Public Investment Fund (PIF) of Saudi Arabia acquired a 15% stake in ACWA Power and has progressively increased its shareholding to 44%, reinforcing ACWA Power’s pivotal role in achieving the Kingdom’s Vision 2030 energy transition goals.

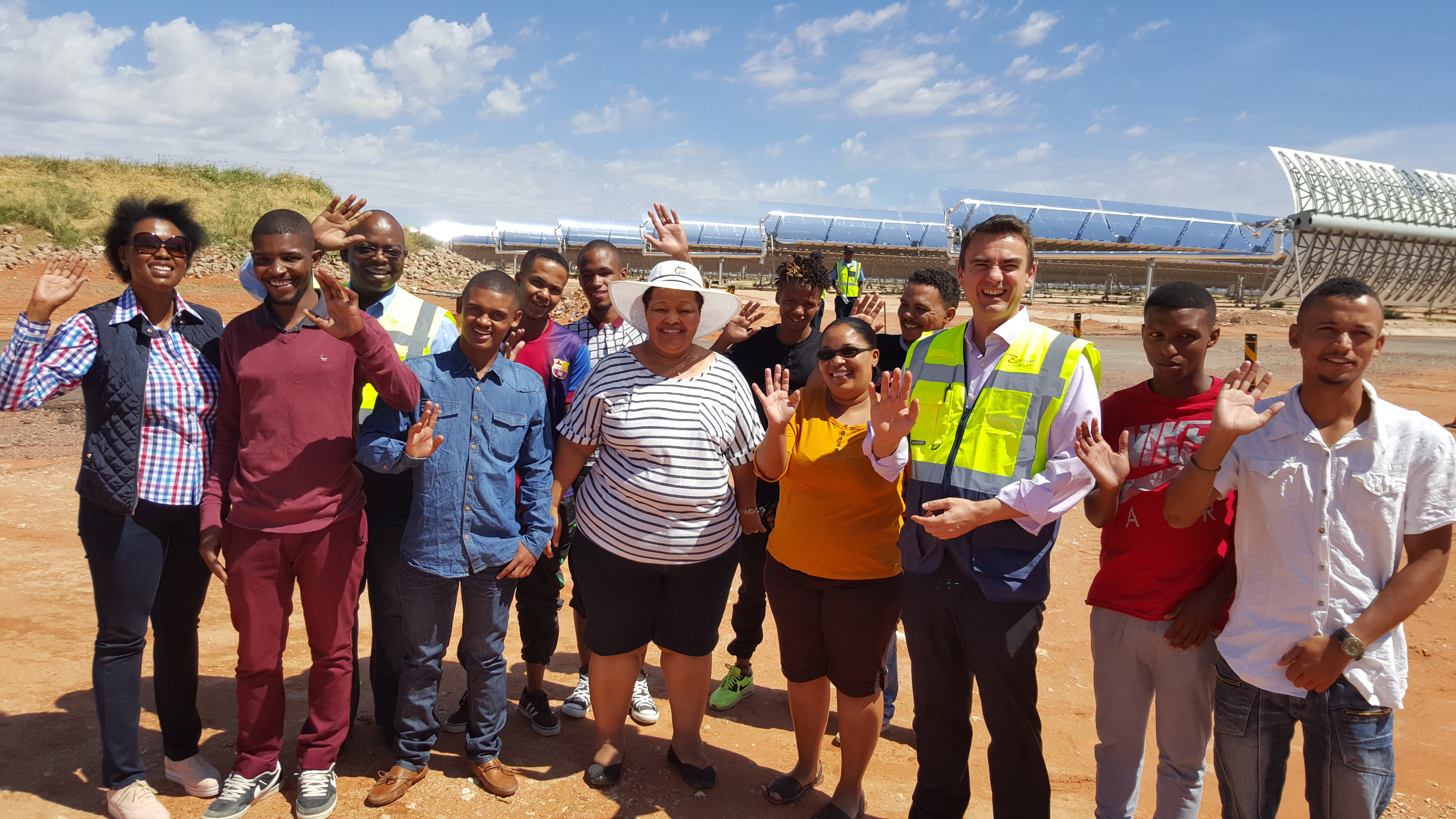
Northern Cape Premier Mrs Sylvia Lucas visits Bokpoort CSP apprentices to get feedback on Apprenticeship Program

=== Sakaka IPP, Saudi Arabia ===
- ACWA Power developed Saudi Arabia’s first major solar project, located in the north of the Kingdom.
- The contract for the 300MW Sakaka IPP was awarded in February 2018 with a 25-year power purchase agreement at a then world record low tariff of $0.0234 per kilowatt hour.

=== Bokpoort Independent Power Project, South Africa ===
- The Bokpoort IPP project, a 50 MW concentrated solar power plant with 9.3 hours thermal storage, was ACWA Power’s first project using CSP technology, and first project in South Africa. Bokpoort IPP commenced commercial operations in December 2015.

=== Noor I, II, III, IV Ouarzazate, Morocco ===
The Noor solar complex in Ouarzazate, Morocco, comprises 510 MW of CSP capacity and 135 MW of solar PV. It was the largest CSP complex globally as of 2019.

- In 2015, ACWA Power was awarded a €1.7 billion contract for two further solar power projects, Noor II and Noor III, in Morocco.
- Noor I was inaugurated in February 2016 and has a generation capacity of 160 MW of electricity. Noor 2 and Noor 3 have a generation capacity of 200 MW and 150 MW respectively. Whereas Noor 1 and 2 both used parabolic CSP technology, Noor 3 was ACWA Power’s first project to utilize tower technology.
- Noor PV1 IPP also located in the Ourzazate Solar complex consists of three photovoltaic plants with a capacity of 135 MW. Noor PV1 has been operational since 2019.

=== Sheikh Mohammed bin Rashid al-Maktoum Solar Park, Dubai ===
- In January 2015 a consortium of ACWA Power and Spain's TSK were selected by Dubai Electricity and Water Authority (DEWA) as the preferred bidder to build the $327 million phase 2 project of the Sheikh Mohammed bin Rashid al-Maktoum Solar Park in the emirate.
- In March 2015, ACWA Power secured a $344 million loan to finance the project.
- The Dubai Electricity and Water Authority (DEWA) signed a Power Purchase Agreement and a Shareholder Agreement with ACWA Power in March 2015 for the 200MW expansion.
- In March 2019, ACWA Power and DEWA completed the financing for a 950 MW concentrated solar power (CSP) project at the Mohammed bin Rashid Solar Park named Noor Energy 1.
- In December 2023, the Noor Energy 1 plant was inaugurated, becoming the largest CSP project in the world.

=== Redstone Solar Thermal Power Project, South Africa ===
- In January 2015 a consortium led by ACWA Power and the USA firm SolarReserve was awarded the right to develop the $1.2 billion Redstone Solar Thermal Power Project in the Northern Cape Province, South Africa. It is a 100 MW concentrating solar power generation project utilizing central tower technology with 12 hours of full-load energy storage.
- In October 2015 financing was secured for the Redstone project when the Overseas Private Investment Corporation (OPIC) signed an agreement to making a US$400mn commitment of debt financing.

=== The Red Sea Destination, Saudi Arabia ===
- In 2020, ACWA Power was awarded the contract for the world’s largest renewable off-grid utilities system at Saudi Arabia’s tourism megaproject The Red Sea Destination.
- The project will feature a battery energy storage system (BESS) with a capacity of more than 1GWh in order to provide a 24-hour supply of energy.
- In December 2021, the company announced that it had closed an agreement for $1.33 billion in senior debt for the project.
- A joint venture led by ACWA Power will construct, manage and operate fully-renewable power, desalination, waste-water treatment, solid waste processing, district cooling plants and communication infrastructure for the project that is a flagship of Saudi Arabia’s Vision 2030 tourism goals.
- Financial close for the project was achieved in early 2022.
- The company has developed more than 20 acres of constructed wetland sustained by municipal wastewater treated by a natural reed bed system.

=== Taweelah IWP, UAE ===
- ACWA Power signed a water purchase agreement in 2019 with the Emirates Water and Electricity Company (EWEC) for the world’s largest reverse osmosis plant, to be located in Abu Dhabi with a capacity of 909,000 cubic meters per day.
- Operations at phase 1 of the plant, with a capacity of 454,600 cubic metres of desalinated water a day, began in June 2022.
- The company announced in May 2023 that Taweelah IWP had reached 90% of capacity, producing 831,935 cubic meters per day of desalinated water and thus becoming the world’s largest reverse osmosis desalination plant by capacity.

=== Hassyan IWP, UAE ===
- ACWA Power was selected in August 2023 to build and operate the first phase of the Hassyan IWP in Dubai, breaking the world record for the lowest levelized water tariff at $0.365 per cubic meter.
- The 818,280 cubic-meter-per-day reverse osmosis plant will be partially powered by solar energy.
- The water purchase agreement worth $914 million was signed in October 2023.

=== Neom Green Hydrogen Project ===
- The NEOM Green Hydrogen Project, based in NEOM, Saudi Arabia, is the world’s largest utility scale, commercially-based hydrogen facility powered entirely by renewable energy.
- The project has a total investment value of USD 8.4 billion.
- An equal joint venture between NEOM, Air Products and ACWA Power, the project is based on proven technologies that will include the integration of a combined capacity of 3.9 GW of renewable power from onshore solar, wind and storage.
- When operational in 2026, it will produce 600 tonnes per day of clean hydrogen by electrolysis; production of nitrogen by air separation; and production of up to 1.2 million tonnes per year of green ammonia.

=== Uzbekistan Green Hydrogen ===
- Construction began on ACWA Power’s first green hydrogen project outside of Saudi Arabia in November 2023.
- The first phase includes a 52MW wind farm capable of producing 3,000 tonnes per year of green ammonia, with a potential second phase capable of producing 120,000 tonnes per year.
