= Sharjah Electricity and Water Authority =

Sharjah Electricity and Water Authority (SEWA)
- Formerly: Sharjah Electricity and Water Co.
- Company type: Government
- Industry: Utility
- Headquarters: Sharjah
- Number of locations: 35 Branches
- Key people: H.E. Saeed Sultan Al Suwaidi (Chairman)
- Number of employees: 4500+
- Website: www.sewa.gov.ae/en/Default.aspx

Sharjah Electricity, Water and Gas Authority (SEWA) is a governmental utility within the Emirate of Sharjah, serving roughly 300,000 consumers with electricity, water, and natural gas. Additionally, SEWA owns a subsidiary, Zulal, specializing in bottled drinking water.

Saeed Sultan Al Suwaidi has served as chairman since 2020.

Sharjah Electricity, Water and Gas Authority became a profit-making organization in 2015, contributing to government revenues. It also won the Best Arab Electricity and Water Authority Award for 2014.

== History ==
Originally a private entity, SEWA transitioned into a Government-owned organization upon the formation of the United Arab Emirates in 1971.

It later became part of the Sharjah government and was renamed the Electricity and Water Department. As the emirate grew, the company expanded to become a financially and administratively independent entity. This decree was issued by Sheikh Dr. Sultan Bin Mohammed Al-Qassimi.

SEWA opened a new SCADA center in Nasseriya in 2015. As of April 2018, it had implemented 40,000 smart meters.

== Power stations ==
As of 2022, SEWA operates the following power stations with a total installed capacity of at least 5,000 MW:

1. Wasit Power Station
2. Layyah Power Station
3. Hamriya Power Station
4. Kalba Power Station
5. Khorfakkan Power Station

Some of SEWA's power is also supplied by Transco (Abu Dhabi).

== Water plants ==
SEWA operates the following water generation plants in UAE. They are mainly desalination plants:

1. Layyah Plant
2. Hamriya Plant (new and old)
3. ADWEA
4. UTICO
5. Khorfakkan
6. Kalba
7. Abu Mussa, Seir Bu Neir & Zubair
8. Sharjah Well Fields
9. Khorfakkan Well Fields

== See also ==
- Abu Dhabi
- Dubai Electricity and Water Authority
- Emirate of Sharjah
- Sharjah Municipality
- Sharjah
- Rashid Al Leem
- Sultan bin Muhammad Al-Qasimi
