= Dubai Electricity and Water Authority =

Company

The Dubai Electricity and Water Authority (DEWA) هيئة كهرباء ومياه دبي
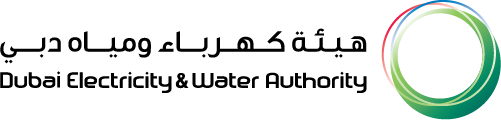
- Type: Utilities (Government-owned)
- Industry: Electricity, Water and District Cooling
- Founded: 1992
- Headquarters: Dubai, United Arab Emirates
- Area served: Emirate of Dubai
- Key people: Saeed Mohammed Al Tayer (CEO)
- Products: Utilities
- Owner: Government of Dubai (82%)
- Subsidiaries: Emirates Central Cooling Systems Corporation (EMPOWER)
- Website: dewa.gov.ae

The Dubai Electricity and Water Authority (DEWA; هيئة كهرباء ومياه دبي) is a public service infrastructure company that was founded on 1 January 1992 by Sheikh Maktoum bin Rashid Al Maktoum.

== History ==
DEWA was formed by merger of the Dubai Electricity Company and the Dubai Water Department that had been operating independently until then. These organizations were established in 1959 by Sheikh Rashid bin Saeed Al Maktoum, the ruler of Dubai at the time. The objective of the state-run company is making available to the people of Dubai an adequate and reliable supply of electricity and water.

As of the end of 2019, DEWA employs a workforce of 11,727 employees and provides 915,623 customers with electricity and 816,580 customers with water.

In 2019, DEWA had an installed capacity of 11,400 MW of electric power and 470 million imperial gallons (2.14 billion liters) of desalinated water per day.

After using conventional gas-fired power plants for most of its history, DEWA built the 5GW Mohammed bin Rashid Al Maktoum Solar Park which is known for breaking several cost records for solar power both from photovoltaics and from concentrated solar power. After installing an initial 13 MW (DC) solar plant as the first phase in 2013, a further 200 MW (AC) second phase was contracted from developer ACWA Power in January 2015. The third phase is an 800 MW PV power plant, which was started in the fall of 2015 and was completed by 2020. DEWA plans a 250 MW pumped-storage hydroelectricity at Hatta using 880 million gallons of water 300 meters above a lower dam.

DEWA was ranked 20th on Forbes Middle East's Top 100 Listed Companies 2025 list.

== 2022 initial public offering ==
In 2022, DEWA planned to float 18% of its issued share capital as a public offering listed on the Dubai Financial Market (DFM), the IPO was estimated at $22.6 billion. The IPO proceeded in April 2022.

== Financial performance ==
For the year 2022, DEWA has posted a net profit of AED 8 billion.

== See also ==
- Energy in the United Arab Emirates
- Solar power in the United Arab Emirates
- Sharjah Electricity and Water Authority
