= Ernest L. Finley =

American newspaper publisher (1870–1942)

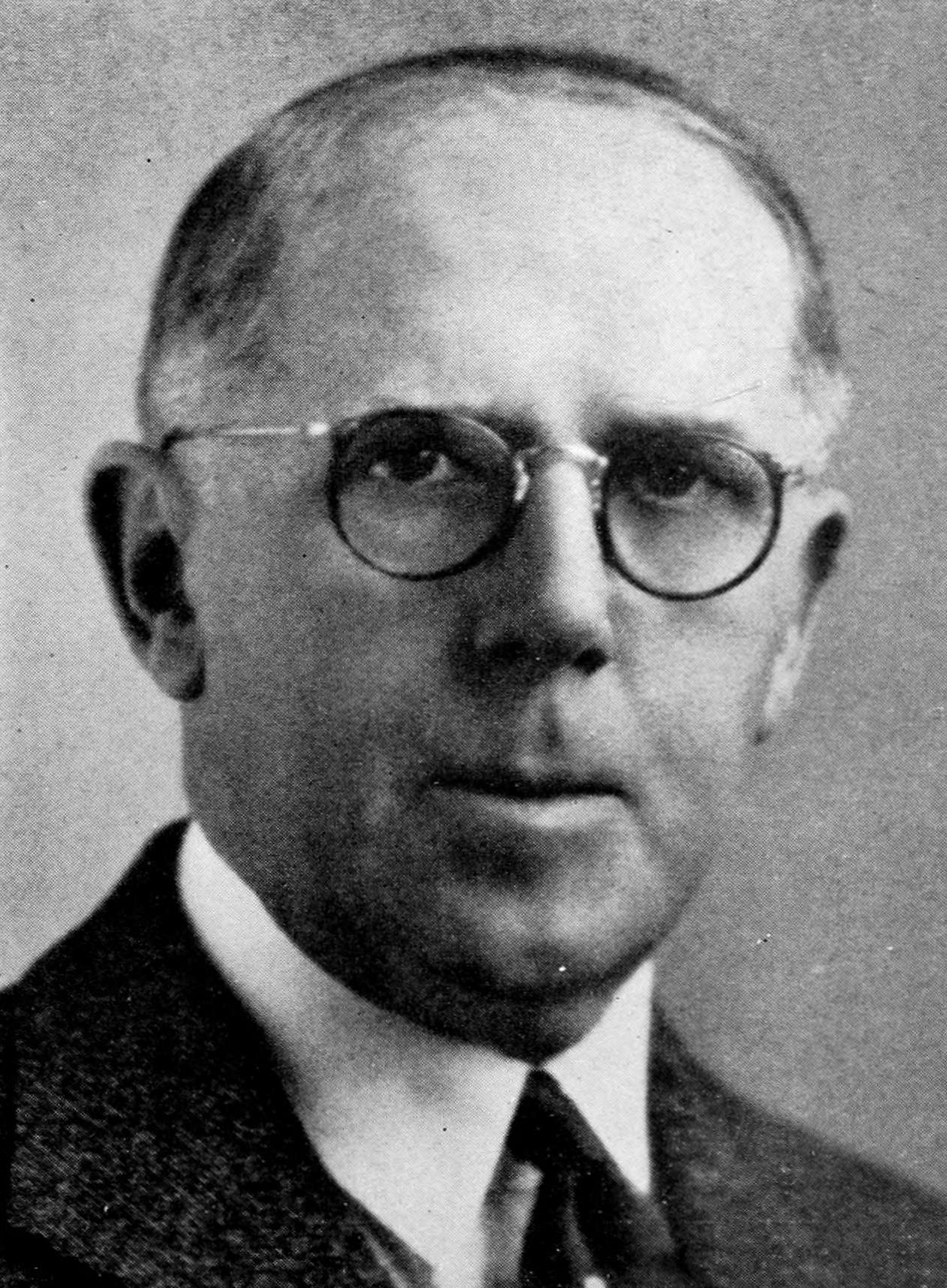
- Finley c. 1940

Postmaster of Santa Rosa
- In office May 13, 1936 – January 10, 1939
- Appointed by: Franklin D. Roosevelt

Personal details
- Born: September 15, 1870 Corvallis, Oregon, U.S.
- Died: October 24, 1942 (aged 72) Santa Rosa, California, U.S.
- Resting place: Chapel of the Chimes Cemetery, Santa Rosa, California
- Party: Democratic
- Spouse: Ruth Woolsey (m. 1912)
- Children: Ruth; Robert
- Parent: William A. Finley (father)
- Education: Pacific Methodist College
- Occupation: Newspaper publisher

Ernest Latimer Finley (September 15, 1870 – October 24, 1942) was an American newspaper publisher from Sonoma County who co-founded The Press Democrat in 1897 and KSRO in 1937, and was active in local civil society.

== Early life ==
Ernest Latimer Finley was born in Corvallis, Oregon on September 15, 1870 to Rev. Dr. William Asa Finley (1839–1912) and Sarah Elizabeth Finley (née Latimer) (1848–1937). Ernest was the second of three children. William was a minister of the Methodist Episcopal Church, South and was serving as the first president of Corvallis College, which would later become Oregon State University. Sarah, the daughter of a Methodist minister, was a nationally published writer and active in the women's suffrage movement in California, particularly in the 1896 and 1911 campaigns. She would later use her son's newspaper as a platform for her activism.

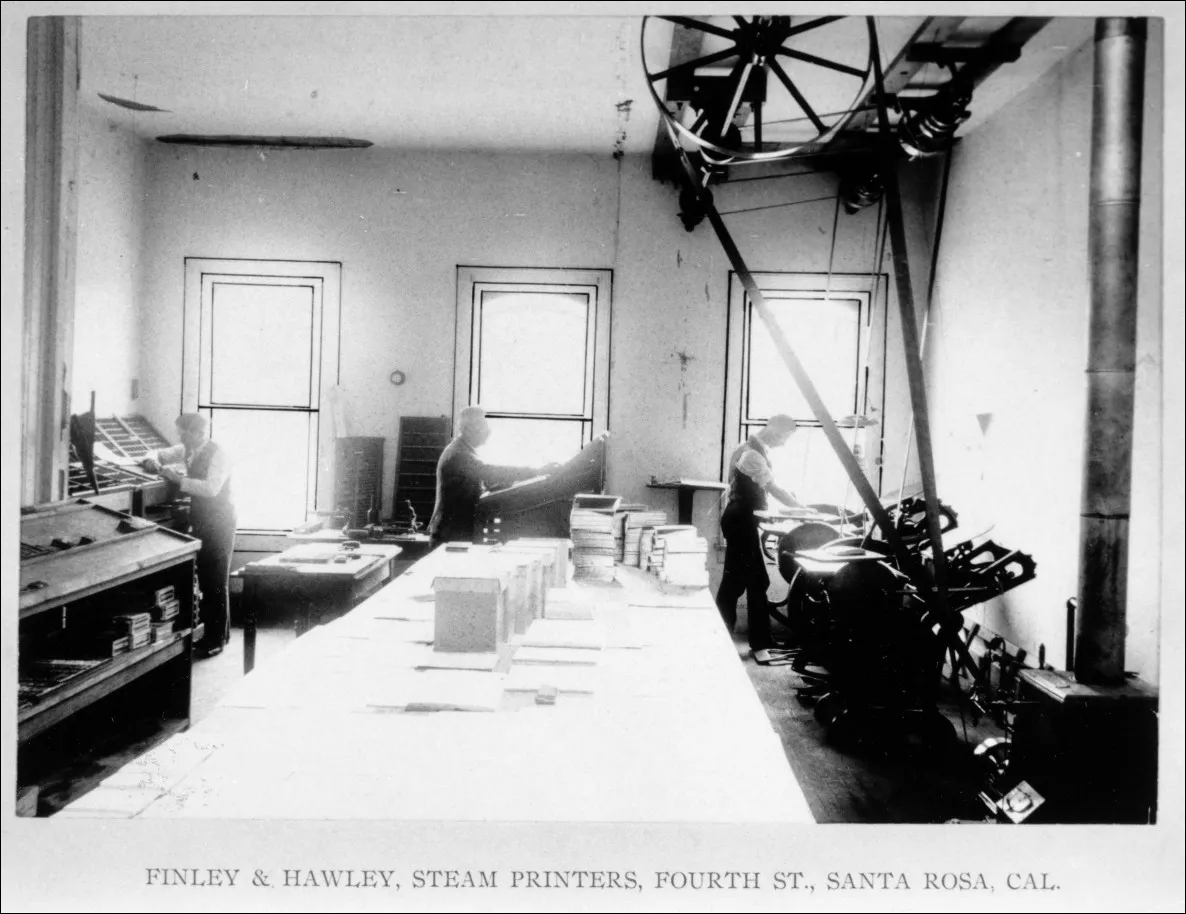
Finley and Hawley Printers c. 1890

The Finleys moved to Santa Rosa, California in 1876 when Rev. Dr. Finley became the second president of Pacific Methodist College. As a teenager, Ernest was interested in printing and operated a small printing press with his friend Rufus Hawley (known as Finley and Hawley) making cards and playbills for the local theater, the Athenaeum, using the proceeds to purchase some ranch land near the Laguna de Santa Rosa. Ernest completed his education at Pacific Methodist College during the early 1890s.

== Publishing career and The Press Democrat ==
In 1895, at 25 years old, Finley and his fellow partners, Grant Richards and Charles O. Dunbar, founded The Evening Press, a daily newspaper in Santa Rosa. Two years later, in 1897, the publishing firm expanded to include Thomas Larkin Thompson's Sonoma Democrat and Daily Democrat newspapers, merging the trio as The Press Democrat.

In 1912, Finley married Ruth Woolsey (1890-1973). Together they had two children, Ruth Finley (1916-1985) and Robert Woolsey Finley (1919-2003).

By 1900, Dunbar and Richards had sold their shares of The Press Democrat to Finley, making him the sole publisher. In 1927, Finley purchased the rival Santa Rosa Republican, operating it in the same building as The Press Democrat, although as separate entities and often with conflicting editorial boards.

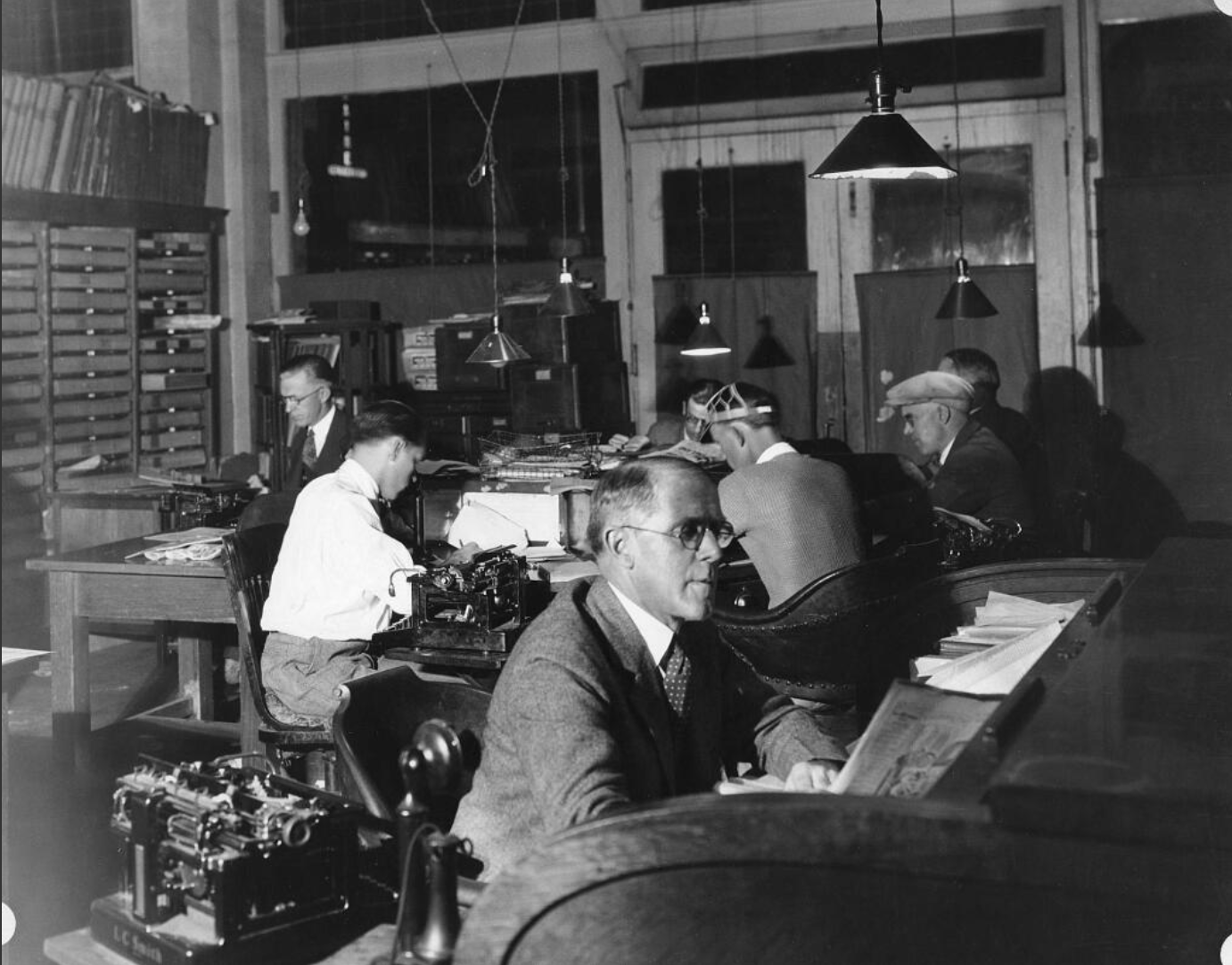
Ernest Finley sits at his desk in The Press Democrat newsroom (around 1920)

Historian Gaye LeBaron, herself a longtime columnist for The Press Democrat, notes that during the Great Depression, Finley would often keep piles of free firewood at the paper's office or accept a basket of apples to pay for a subscription. Among one of Finley's chief goals during the Depression was to promote local agriculture and prevent farms from being foreclosed upon.

== Civic life and KSRO ==
Spearheaded by Frank Pierce Doyle, the president of the Santa Rosa Exchange Bank, Finley used his newspapers to strongly campaign for the development and construction of the Golden Gate Bridge, at times at the cost of losing subscribers and advertisers opposed to the project. To this, Finley reportedly said, "Damn the circulation! The bridge must be built!"

Particularly through The Press Democrat, Finley was active in Democratic Party politics. On May 13, 1936, President Franklin D. Roosevelt appointed Finley as Postmaster of Santa Rosa, a role he served until January 10, 1939.

Finley was active and well-connected in Sonoma County civil society, counting among his friends the great horticulturist Luther Burbank and cartoonist Robert Ripley. In 1932 he published Santa Rosans I Have Known, a book where he recounted personal experiences he had with Santa Rosa's most notable residents. He was a member of the Santa Rosa Chamber of Commerce, serving as president in 1909 and 1910; a member of the California Chamber of Commerce; and president of the Redwood Empire Newspaper Publishers' Association.

In his papers, Finley's civic campaigns also included those seeking treatments for infantile paralysis and against "tree butchery" (believing every living tree should be protected from logging).

Following in his father's footsteps, over a decade and a half after his alma mater Pacific Methodist College closed in 1902, in 1918 Finley supported the foundation of Santa Rosa Junior College. Having been interested in music since childhood, in 1928 Finley was one of the founders of the Santa Rosa Symphony Orchestra. Alongside Frank Pierce Doyle, in 1936 Finley was one of the founders of the Sonoma County Fair to promote local agriculture.

In May 1937, Finley founded KSRO, then Santa Rosa's only and presently oldest operating radio station.

== Death and legacy ==
On October 24, 1942, at the age of 72 and having been the publisher of The Press Democrat for 45 years, Finley unexpectedly died in Santa Rosa at his home at 1020 McDonald Avenue. Ownership of the paper passed to his widow, Ruth, who ran The Press Democrat (merging the Santa Rosa Republican into the fold in 1948) until 1973, before passing it to their son-in-law Evert B. Person, who in 1985, sold it to The New York Times Company.

Operating between 1967 and 2020, Ruth founded the Ernest L. and Ruth W. Finley Foundation, which donated over $40 million in grants to numerous charitable organizations and projects around Santa Rosa, including the Luther Burbank Center for the Arts (where the principal performance space is named for Ernest and Ruth's daughter, Ruth Finley Person). The Finley Community Center, adjacent Aquatic Center, and park in Santa Rosa are named for Ernest and Ruth. Finley Hall at the Sonoma County Fairgrounds is also named for Ernest in commemoration for his co-founding of the fair.

In 1977, Finley was posthumously inducted into the California Newspaper Hall of Fame, where his portrait hangs.

== See also ==
- The Press Democrat
- KSRO
