= Harvest Moon Cafe =

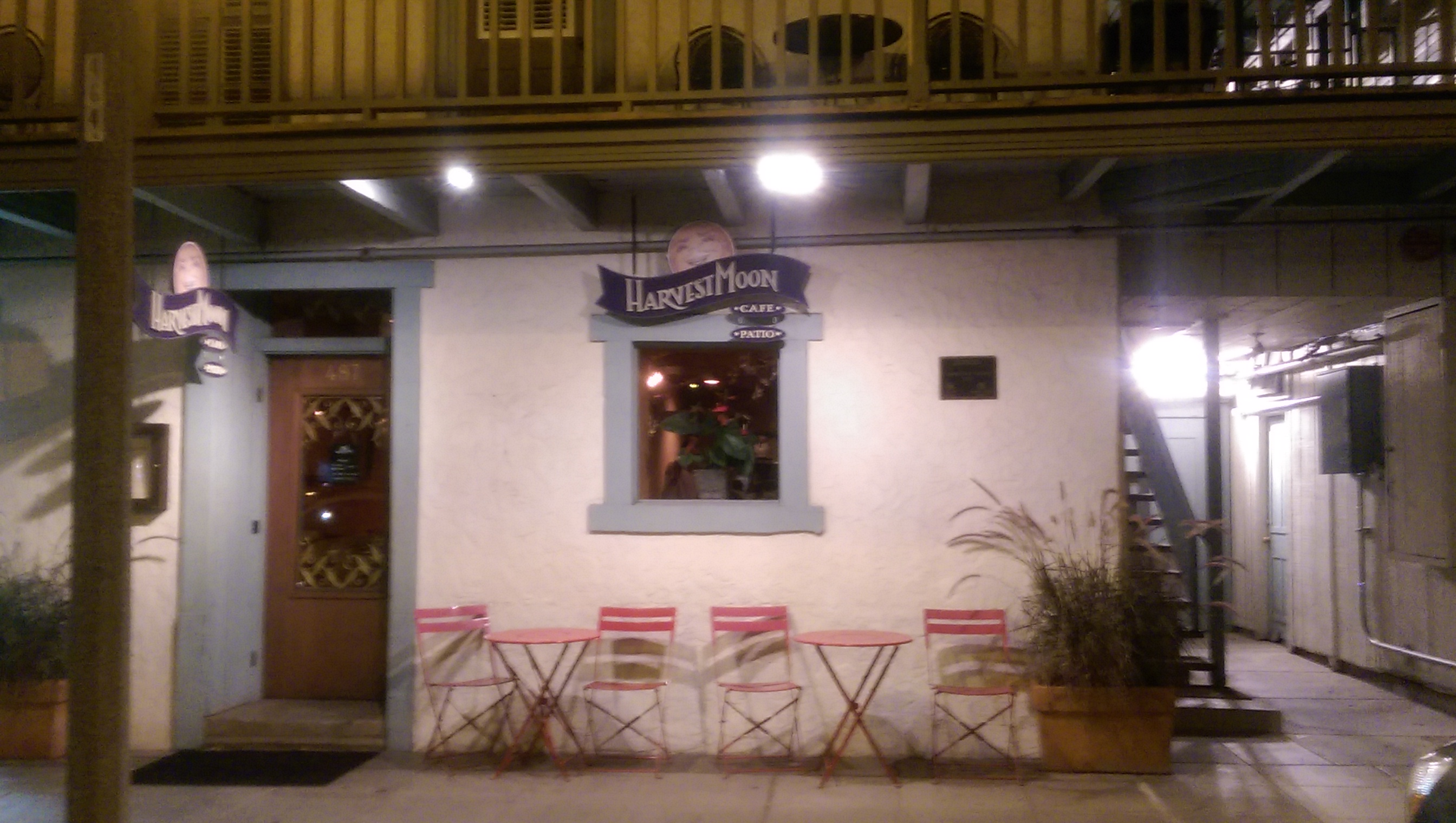
- Interactive map of Harvest Moon Cafe

Restaurant information
- Owners: Nick & Jenn Demarest
- Head chef: Nick Demarest
- Food type: New American cuisine
- Dress code: Casual
- Rating: Zagat
- Location: 487 1st St. West, Sonoma, California, 95476, United States
- Coordinates: 38°17′32.51″N 122°27′33″W
- Seating capacity: 92

Harvest Moon Cafe was a New American restaurant in Sonoma, California in the United States. The restaurant closed in September 2019 after thirteen years of service.

== History ==
Harvest Moon Cafe was owned by married couple Nick and Jen Demarest. Nick Demarest worked at Chez Panisse and Eccolo, both in Berkeley, California. Jen Demarest, a pastry chef, worked at La Toque when it was located in Rutherford, California. She serves as Harvest Moon's pastry chef and runs the front of the house while Nick is executive chef. The Demarests met at the Culinary Institute of America in Hyde Park, New York. They eventually moved to Cyprus where Nick worked as the private chef to the United States Ambassador to Cyprus. They relocated again to Santa Fe, New Mexico where he worked for David Tanis. Finally, they moved to California.

The restaurant closed in on September 1, 2019, after thirteen years of service. Nick Demerest told the Sonoma Index-Tribune that "it's time for a break," regarding the closure. He also cited increased costs of food prices as another factor. The restaurant was to a beverage and hospitality firm called SurPointe. The company plans to open a wine bar in the former restaurant. Jen Demerest is opening a restaurant in Boyes Hot Springs. The restaurant was featured in Fodor's, the San Francisco Chronicle, and The Press Democrat.

== Design ==
Harvest Moon was located in downtown Sonoma in the former location of a restaurant that was called Sonoma Saveur. The restaurant was designed by architect Adrian Martinez. The restaurant had a small dark stucco interior with an equally small open kitchen. There were two small bars, one which displayed wine and bread. The restaurant had no air conditioning. A large outdoor patio extended into the back of the property. A tent was put up in the winter to allow for year-round outdoor dining.

== Cuisine ==
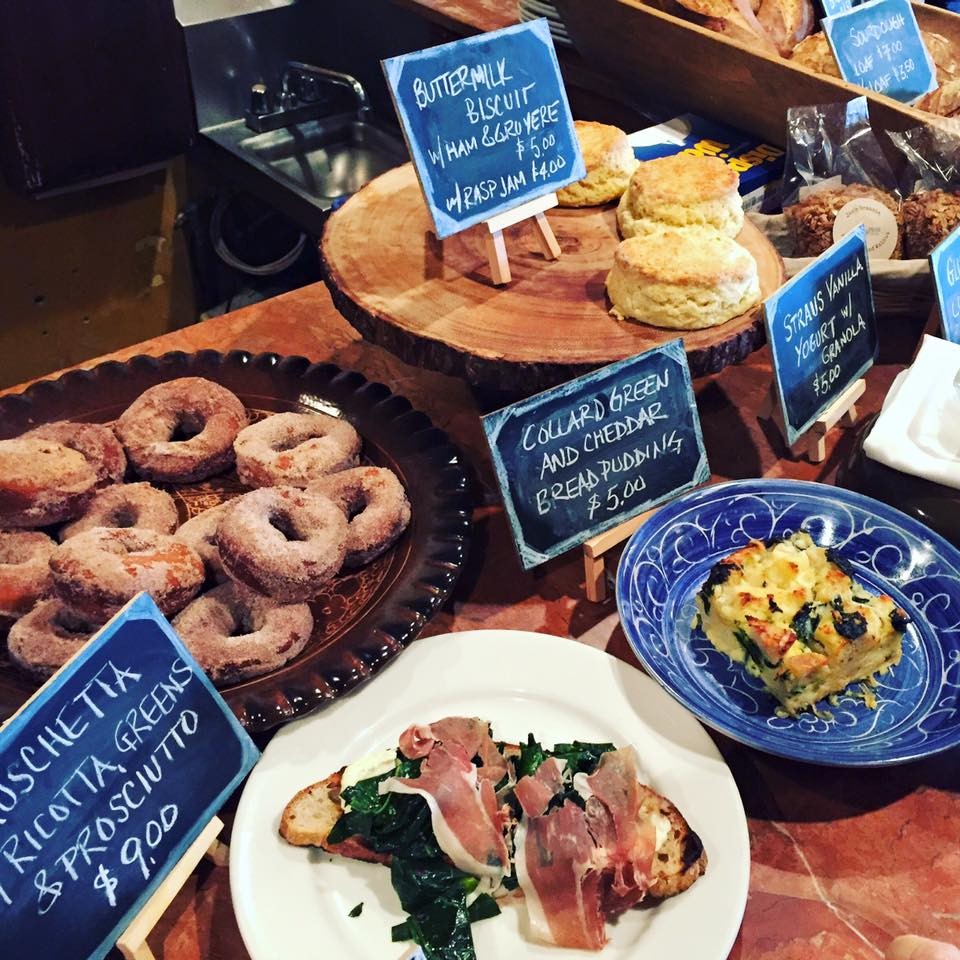
Breakfast at Harvest Moon Cafe

Harvest Moon Cafe served dinner and Sunday brunch. The restaurant described its food as New American cuisine, when Zagat has described it as "Cal-Med" (California cuisine-Mediterranean cuisine). Harvest Moon Cafe used primarily locally sourced seasonal ingredients. Each night, the restaurant's menu had six appetizers and five entrees available. The menu included steak from Niman Ranch, polenta with artichokes, potato soup and chicory salad. The restaurant also makes their own charcuterie. Desserts may have included pot de creme or cobbler. Harvest Moon had approximately 32 wines by the bottle.

== See also ==
- List of New American restaurants
