= KSRO =

News/talk radio station in Santa Rosa, California

- Santa Rosa, California; United States
- Broadcast area: Sonoma County, California
- Frequency: 1350 kHz
- Branding: KSRO 1350 AM, 103.5 FM, and 94.5 FM

Programming
- Format: Talk radio
- Network: ABC News Radio
- Affiliations: Fox News Radio; Premiere Networks; Westwood One; Golden State Warriors; Las Vegas Raiders

Ownership
- Owner: Lawrence Amaturo; (Amaturo Sonoma Media Group, LLC)
- Sister stations: KFGY, KHTH, KVRV, KWVF, KZST

History
- First air date: May 1937
- Call sign meaning: Santa Rosa

Technical information
- Licensing authority: FCC
- Facility ID: 22881
- Class: B
- Power: 5,000 watts
- Transmitter coordinates: 38°26′21.7″N 122°44′55″W
- Translators: 94.5 K233CM (Petaluma); 96.9 K245DJ (Petaluma); 103.5 K278CD (Santa Rosa)

Links
- Public license information: Public file; LMS
- Webcast: Listen live
- Website: ksro.com

KSRO (1350 AM) is a commercial radio station licensed to Santa Rosa, California, United States, and serves the Sonoma County area. Owned by Lawrence Amaturo, through licensee Amaturo Sonoma Media Group, LLC, it features a talk radio format.

KSRO's transmitter is sited off of Stony Point Road in Santa Rosa. KSRO programming is also heard on three FM translators: K278CD, broadcasting at 103.5 MHz in Santa Rosa, and 94.5 K233CM and 96.9 K245DJ in Petaluma.

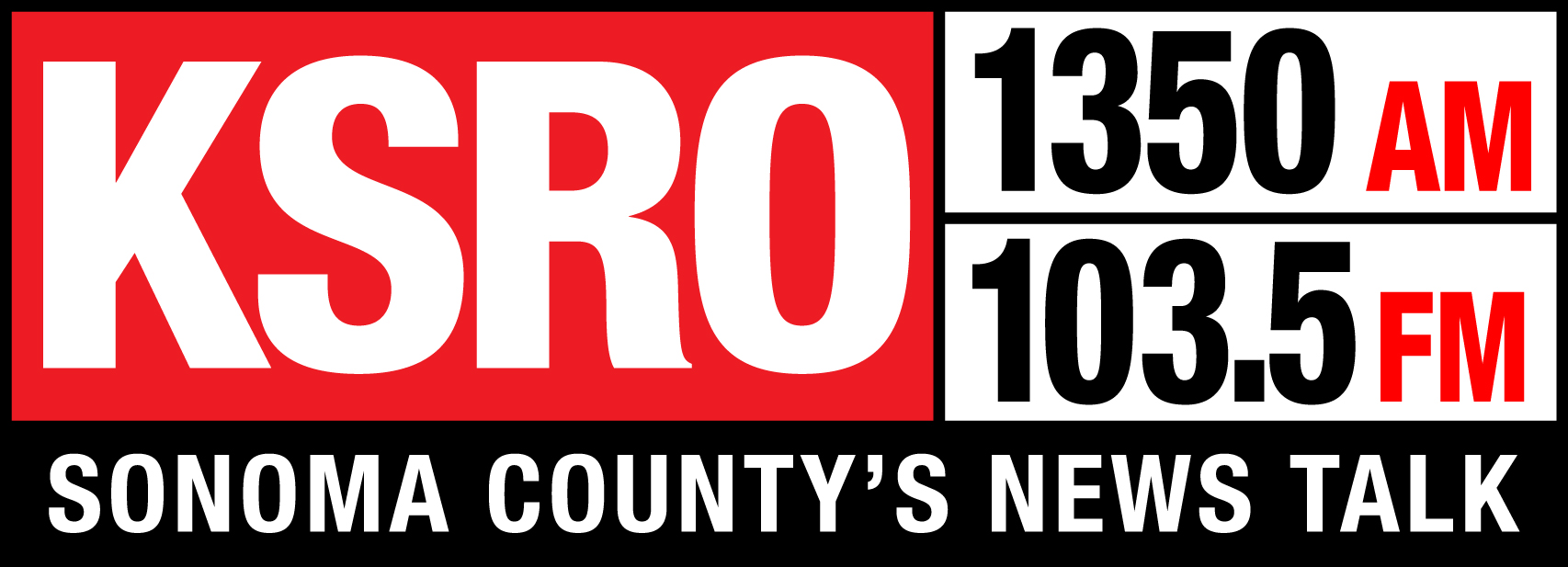
Former logo

== History ==
Though predated by short-lived KFNV, KSRO is the oldest station in Santa Rosa still broadcasting. In May 1937, KSRO first signed on. The station was founded by Ernest L. Finley, owner of the Santa Rosa Press Democrat. The ownership of the station passed to Finley's wife Ruth, when he died in 1942. The station achieved some fame in 1943, when an actual broadcast was included in Alfred Hitchcock's film Shadow of a Doubt, filmed on location in Santa Rosa.

KSRO began broadcasting Santa Rosa Junior College football games in 1939, when the school joined the Northern California Junior College Conference. This initiated a fifty-year relationship.

In the 1950s and 1960s, KSRO played Top 40 music. Its strong signal carried through the mountainous regions of the county. It was one of the few stations that could be received in the Russian River resort area. Like many AM stations, the increasing popularity of FM radio resulted in KSRO's change of format, first to middle of the road (MOR) music with talk and news, and then to all talk and news. In 2020, KSRO became the Bay Area station for broadcasts of Las Vegas Raiders games.

== Programming ==
KSRO features nationally syndicated talk programs, mostly from Premiere Networks and Westwood One.

KSRO recently discontinued a local weekday wake-up news and information show, "Sonoma County's Morning News with Michelle Marques". In the afternoon there used to be "The Drive with Steve Jaxon" was heard, Sonoma County's only local weekday talk show. The Drive featured interviews with newsmakers, musicians, authors, and comedians. In 2012, The Drive's weekly "California Wine Country" segment was the winner of "Best Critic or Review Series" at the 2015 Taste Awards, and has been a multiple-time nominee for Best Food or Drink Radio Broadcast.

Live sports broadcasts on KSRO include the Las Vegas Raiders and the Golden State Warriors. In the fall, high school football games are broadcast.

KSRO logo used in various forms from 2001 to 2013.
