= Frank Pierce Doyle =

American banker and philanthropist (1863–1948)

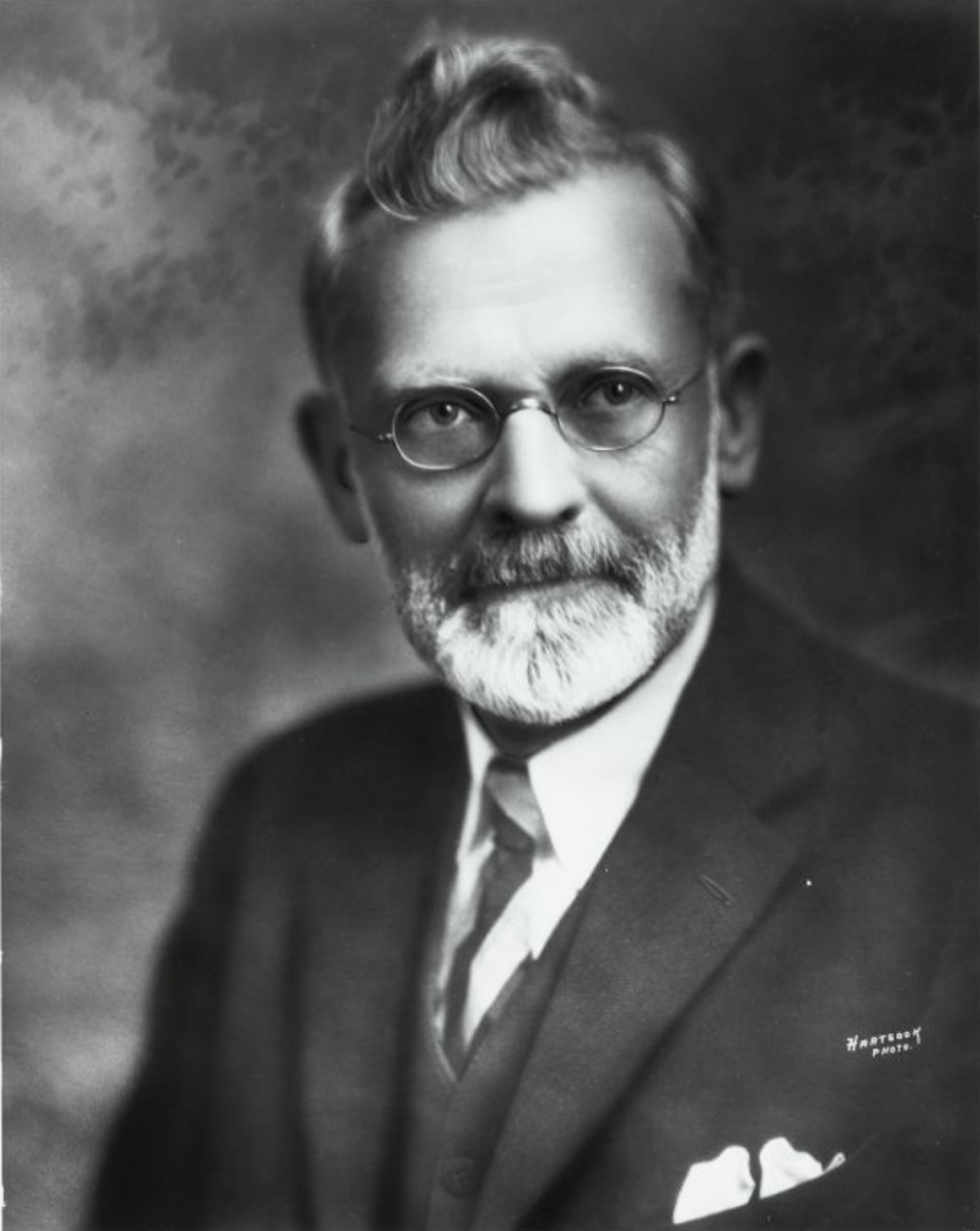
- Born: 30 May 1863; Petaluma, California
- Died: 5 August 1948 (aged 85); Santa Rosa, California
- Burial place: Santa Rosa Odd Fellows Cemetery
- Occupations: Banker; Philanthropist

Frank Pierce Doyle (30 May 1863 – 5 August 1948) was an American banker and philanthropist who was active in Sonoma County civil society and is known as the "Father of the Golden Gate Bridge."

== Early life ==
Frank Pierce Doyle was born in Petaluma, California on May 30, 1863, to Manville Doyle (1831–1916) and Mary Evelyn Doyle (née Conley) (1843–1926). Frank was the second of ten children, only three of which would live to adulthood. Manville, a native of Springfield, Illinois arrived in California in 1850 during the California Gold Rush, settling in Petaluma in 1855. Shortly after Frank's birth, the family moved to Cloverdale. The family returned to Petaluma in 1876 where Manville served as a city councilman and as president of the Petaluma Water Works. Frank graduated from Petaluma High School in 1880. In 1886, Frank became the manager of the Petaluma Water Works, succeeding his father.

== Early career and the Santa Rosa Exchange Bank ==
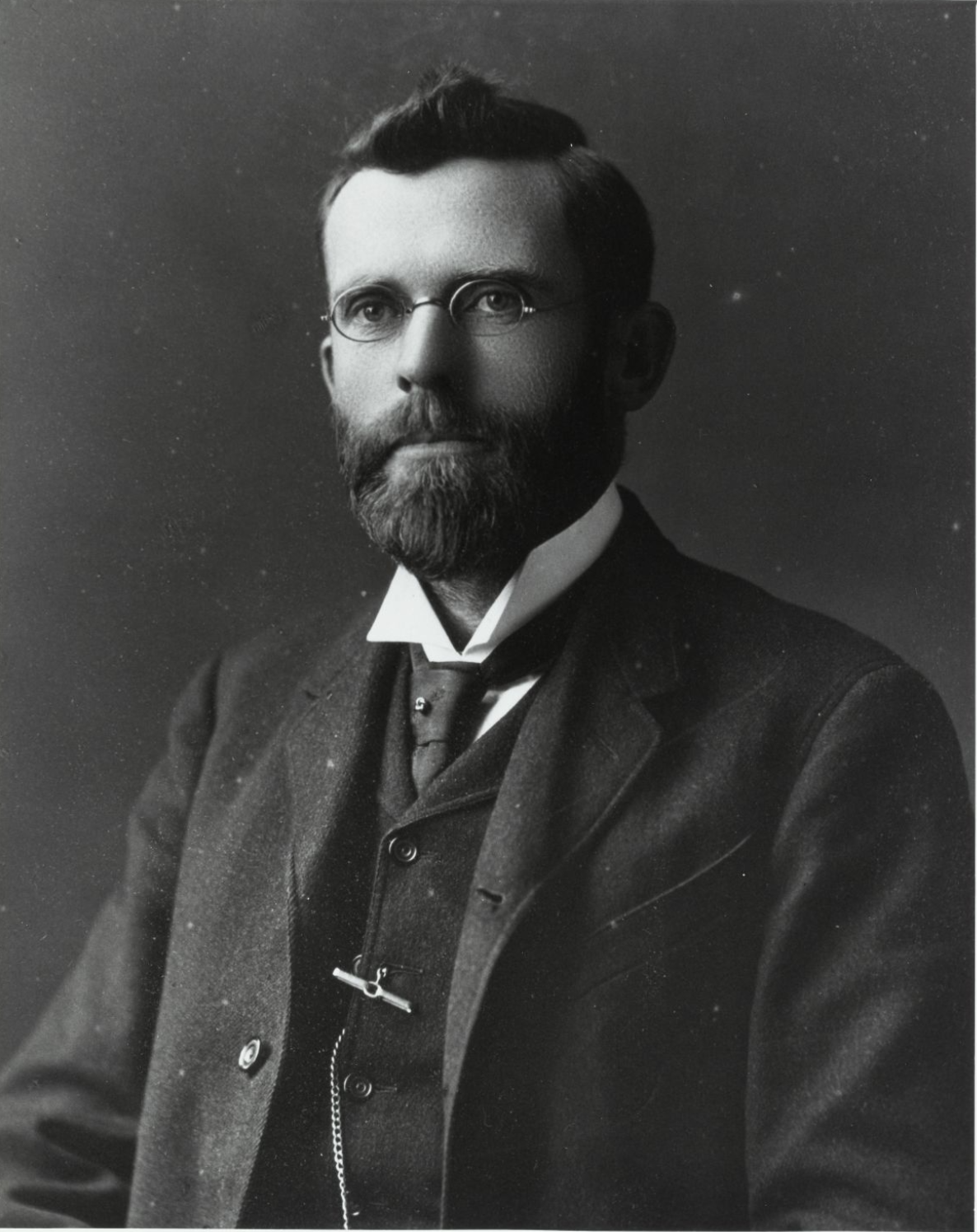
Frank P. Doyle around 1900

In 1890, Manville moved to Santa Rosa, California and founded the Santa Rosa Exchange Bank at the corner of 4th Street and Mendocino Avenue, with Frank working as the bank's cashier.

In 1903, Frank married Mary Amelia "Polly" O'Meara (1867–1944). In 1907, their son, Frankie O'Meara Doyle, was born. However, in 1921, Frankie died from complications following tonsillectomy surgery.

In the aftermath of the 1906 San Francisco earthquake, which nearly destroyed the entire downtown of Santa Rosa, Doyle, an automobile enthusiast, played an important role in convincing local business owners to donate frontage space so that the rebuilt streets may be widened for the increased future usage of automobiles. As the city rebuilt, Doyle founded the Santa Rosa Chamber of Commerce to revive the local economy, and served as its first chairman. Built in 1911, the Doyle Building, located at 643 4th Street in Santa Rosa, was named for Doyle to commemorate his efforts rebuilding the city.

In August 1916, Frank succeeded his father as president of the Santa Rosa Exchange Bank. In addition to running the bank, Doyle operated fruit and dairy ranches around Sonoma County.

Doyle was an early member of the Redwood Empire Association, which promoted tourism in the region and the newly built northern portion of Highway 101 with publicity stunts like the 1927 and 1928 Redwood Highway Marathons.

== Golden Gate Bridge ==
As speculation as to whether a bridge across the Golden Gate Strait connecting Marin County and San Francisco grew in the early 20th century, on January 13, 1923, in Santa Rosa, Doyle organized and served as one of the foundational members of the "Bridging the Golden Gate Association," which would formally become the Golden Gate Bridge, Highway and Transportation District in 1928.

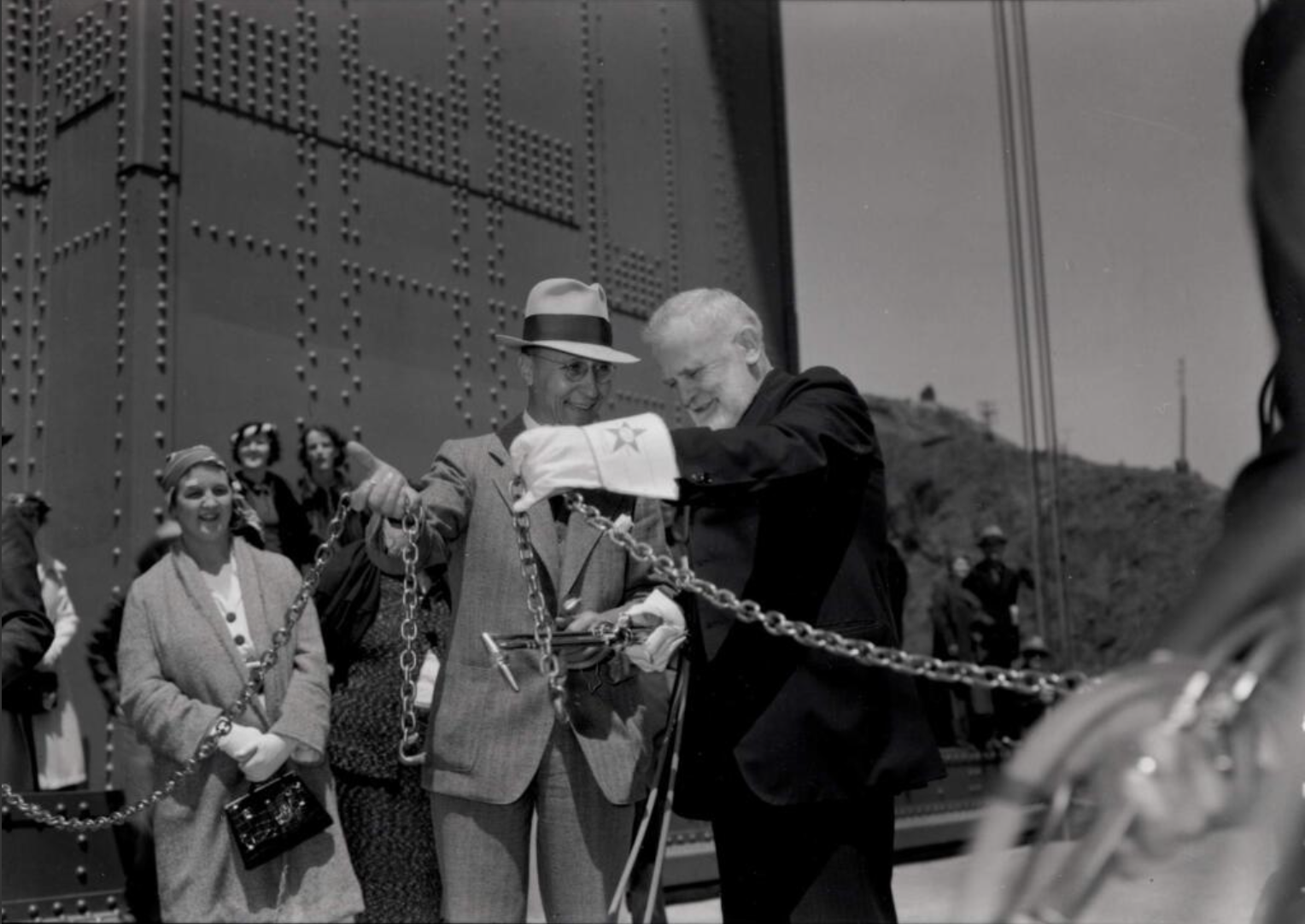
Frank P. Doyle cutting the chain to open the Golden Gate Bridge (1937)

For fifteen years, Doyle dedicated significant time and funds serving as a director of the bridge executive committee, and served as president of the board. On May 27, 1937, Doyle was given the honor of ceremonially breaking the chain to officially open the completed Golden Gate Bridge to the public and to be the first person to cross it in a private automobile. As a result of his efforts to conceive and complete the bridge, Doyle has been referred to as the "Father of the Golden Gate Bridge."

== Later life and death ==
Doyle was active in numerous civil society and business organizations, including being the founder and long-time president of the Redwood Empire Association; I.O.O.F. Lodge of Petaluma; Native Sons of the Golden West; director of the California Automobile Association; board director for the Bank of Sonoma County; board director for the Bank of Guerneville; and Santa Rosa Rotary Club.

Historian Gaye LeBaron has noted that during the Great Depression, Doyle gained a reputation in the county for allowing his bank to carry mortgages for farmers who he knew couldn't pay them back, and sometimes Doyle would pay off the loans himself.

In 1934, Doyle helped establish Sonoma Coast State Park, which runs between Bodega Bay and Jenner. In 1936, alongside local newspaper publisher Ernest L. Finley and other civic leaders, Doyle helped found the Sonoma County Fair to showcase local agriculture.

On August 5, 1948, Doyle died at his home at the corner of Pierce and Third Streets in Santa Rosa a week after suffering a stroke. As a part of his will and without any living children, Doyle left the entirety of his 50.3% controlling share interest in the Santa Rosa Exchange Bank in perpetual trust to Santa Rosa Junior College to provide scholarship funds for students to attend the school. Since 1949, the Doyle Trust has provided over $83 million to over 135,000 students in scholarships.

== Legacy ==
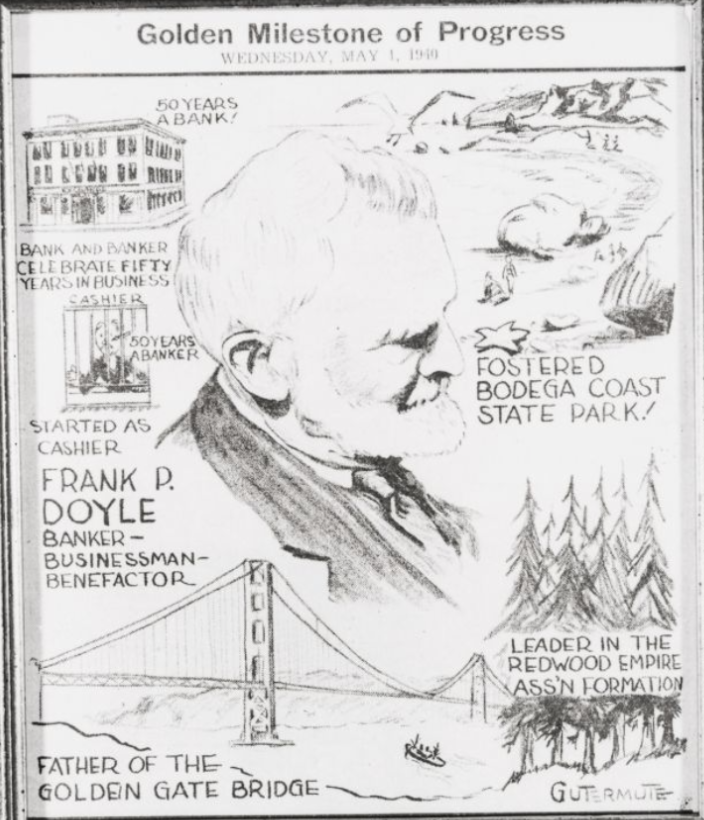
Tribute cartoon around 1940

Built in 2006, the Frank P. Doyle Library at Santa Rosa Junior College is named for Doyle, and the Polly O'Meara Doyle Residence Hall at the college (built in 2023) is named for his wife. Having purchased the land and gifting it to the city in honor of his late son in 1921, Doyle Community Park in Santa Rosa is named in Frankie's honor, as is the adjacent Doyle Park Drive. Doyle Park Elementary School in Santa Rosa, which operated from 1951 to 2013, too derived its name from Doyle. Although now largely redesigned with the construction of Presidio Parkway in 2015, Doyle Drive in San Francisco, which leads directly to the Golden Gate Bridge, was named in his honor.
