= Buffalo Academy =

Buffalo Academy may refer to:

- Buffalo Academy of the Sacred Heart, a Roman Catholic high school for girls in Eggertsville, New York outside Buffalo
- Buffalo Academy for Visual and Performing Arts, a performing arts high school in Buffalo, New York
- Buffalo Academy, a former school that is now part of the Buffalo Town Square Historic District in West Virginia
