= KZST =

Coordinates: 38.419°N 122.677°W

Santa Rosa, California; United States
- Broadcast area: Sonoma County, California
- Frequency: 100.1 MHz
- Branding: 100.1 KZST

Programming
- Format: Adult contemporary
- Affiliations: Premiere Networks

Ownership
- Owner: Lawrence V. Amaturo; (Amaturo Sonoma Media Group, LLC)
- Sister stations: KFGY, KHTH, KSRO, KVRV, KWVF

History
- First air date: April 18, 1971
- Call sign meaning: "Zest"

Technical information
- Licensing authority: FCC
- Facility ID: 55430
- Class: A
- ERP: 6,000 watts
- HAAT: 75 meters (246 ft)
- Translator: 99.1 K256DA (Santa Rosa)

Links
- Public license information: Public file; LMS
- Webcast: Listen Live
- Website: kzst.com

KZST (100.1 FM) is a commercial radio station licensed to Santa Rosa, California, and serving Sonoma County. It is owned by Lawrence V. Amaturo, through licensee Amaturo Sonoma Media Group, LLC, and broadcasts an adult contemporary radio format, switching to Christmas music for much of November and December. Evenings, it carries the nationally syndicated Delilah call in and request show. KZST's radio studios and offices are on Mendocino Avenue in Santa Rosa.

KZST has an effective radiated power (ERP) of 6,000 watts. The transmitter is off Mount Bennett Drive in Santa Rosa. The station has two booster stations also broadcasting on 100.1 MHz: KZST-1, 46 watts, is in Petaluma. And 1,200 watt KZST-2 is in Rohnert Park.

== History ==
On April 18, 1971 (the 65th anniversary of the Great earthquake), the station signed on the air. That made KZST "the first FM station between here (the San Francisco Bay Area) and Portland, Oregon."

Founded by Gordon Zlot, KZST was long-time operated under the ownership of his company, Redwood Empire Stereocasters. In morning drive time, Brent Farris had broadcast his "Morning Showgram" for more than 25 years, the longest current tenure of any radio host in Sonoma County, with multiple co-hosts assisting him over that span of time. Farris has since retired after a radio career that spanned 47 long years. Debbie Abrams, Farris's very last co-host leading up to his retirement, now is the sole host of the KZST morning show. Sue Hall and Mike Adams cover the KZST afternoon time slots. Jim Grady, the weekend morning host, held that distinction until March 26, 2004, when he was released from news/talk station KSRO after 44 years. KZST for a number of years aired two syndicated radio shows hosted by Dick Clark, Rock, Roll, and Remember was on Saturday nights, and Countdown America was on Sunday mornings.

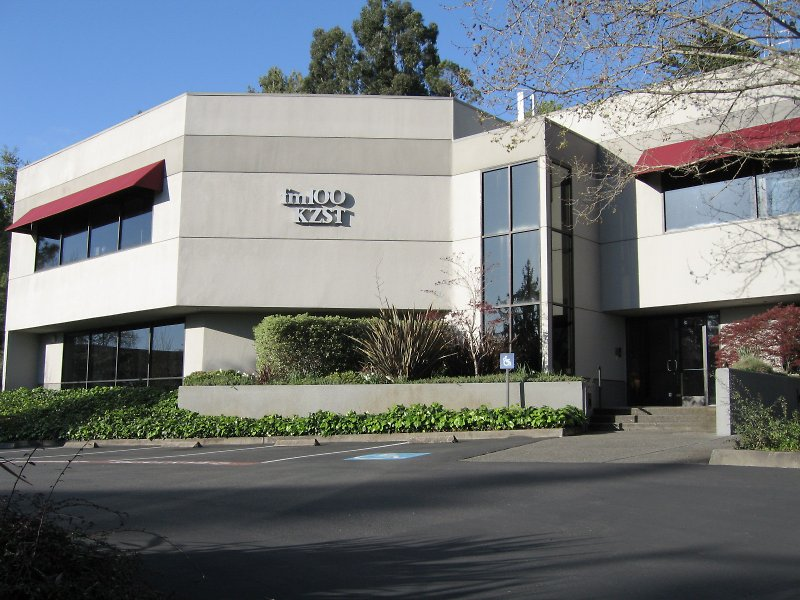
The KZST-FM studios and offices

"Jazzy 93.7" KJZY shared the same building and ownership.

In June 2022, it was announced that KZST and sister stations KWVF, K256DA, and K273CU would be sold by Redwood Empire Stereocasters to Amaturo Sonoma Media Group for $6 million. The sale was consummated on December 1, 2022.
