= Duke Iversen =

American football player (1920–2011)

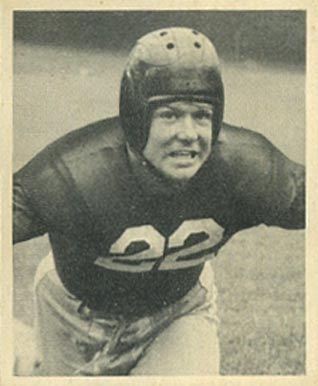
- Iversen on a 1948 Bowman football card

No. 22, 66, 82, 15
- Position: Back

Personal information
- Born: February 26, 1920; Petaluma, California, U.S.
- Died: May 20, 2011 (aged 91); Petaluma, California, U.S.
- Listed height: 6 ft 2 in (1.88 m)
- Listed weight: 208 lb (94 kg)

Career information
- High school: Petaluma
- College: Oregon (1939–1942, 1946)
- NFL draft: 1947: 7th round, 54th overall pick

Career history
- New York Giants (1947–1948); New York Yankees (1948–1949); New York Yanks (1950–1951)

Career NFL/AAFC statistics
- Rushing yards: 50
- Rushing average: 8.3
- Receptions: 5
- Receiving yards: 41
- Total touchdowns: 1
- Stats at Pro Football Reference

Christopher Arnold "Duke" Iversen (February 26, 1920 – May 20, 2011) was an American professional football player who played five seasons in the National Football League (NFL) and All-America Football Conference (AAFC) with the New York Giants, New York Yankees and New York Yanks. He was selected by the Giants in the seventh round of the 1947 NFL draft after playing college football at the University of Oregon.

== Early life ==
Christopher Arnold Iversen was born on February 26, 1920, in Petaluma, California to Danish immigrants Chris and Karen Iverson. His family's name was spelled "Iverson" but a doctor misspelled it as "Iversen" on Duke's birth certificate. He grew up on a sheep and poultry ranch. He played high school football at Petaluma High School from 1935 to 1938. Iversen was a charter member of Petaluma High School's Sports Hall of Fame.

== College and military career ==
Iversen accepted a scholarship to attend the University of Oregon and play college football for the Oregon Ducks. He was a member of the Ducks freshman team in 1939. He was then a three-year letterman for the Ducks from 1940 to 1942. His football career was interrupted by a stint in the United States Marine Corps during World War II. Iversen was initially stationed in Jacksonville, Florida, where he trained in aviation ordnance and played football on a service team for two years. He was then transferred to Okinawa, Japan where he taught hand-to-hand combat and played football. In 1946, he returned to the Ducks for his final season of college football. He played in the East-West Shrine Game after his senior year.

== Professional career ==
Iversen was selected by the New York Giants of the National Football League (NFL) in the seventh round, with the 54th overall pick, of the 1947 NFL draft. He played in eight games, starting five, for the Giants during the 1947 season, recovering three fumbles, catching one pass for 11 yards, and returning one kick for 16 yards. He was released by the Giants on September 20, 1948.

Iversen signed with the New York Yankees of the All-America Football Conference (AAFC) on September 26, 1948. He appeared in ten games, starting one, for the Yankees in 1948, accumulating four receptions for 30 yards and one interception. He played in 12 game for the newly-renamed Brooklyn-New York Yankees during the final season of the AAFC in 1949, totaling one interception, six carries for 50 yards, and two kick returns for 18 yards. He also started one playoff game that season, recording one interception.

Iversen started the first seven games of the 1950 season for the New York Yanks of the NFL, recording three interceptions for 26 yards and a touchdown, before being placed on injured reserve on October 30, 1950. He played in nine games, starting seven, in 1951, recording one kick return for 14 yards. He was released by the Yanks in 1951.

== Later life ==
Soon after his football career ended, Iversen sold the family ranch and entered the real estate business. He died on May 20, 2011, in Petaluma, California.
