= Argus-Courier =

Weekly newspaper in Sonoma County, California

- Type: Weekly newspaper
- Format: Broadsheet
- Owner: MediaNews Group
- Founder: Thomas Larkin Thompson
- Publisher: Emily Charrier
- Editor: Don Frances
- Founded: 1855
- Language: English
- Headquarters: Sonoma County, California
- Circulation: 7,400
- Sister newspapers: The Press Democrat, Sonoma Index-Tribune
- Website: petalumanews.com
- Free online archives: cdnc.ucr.edu (1950)

The Argus-Courier is an American weekly paid newspaper which serves the city of Petaluma and surrounding Sonoma County, California. It is published weekly on Friday, with an estimated circulation of 7,400.

== History ==
On August 18, 1855, Thomas Larkin Thompson published the first issue of the Petaluma Weekly Journal and Sonoma County Advertiser. Thompson sold the paper on April 26, 1856, to Henry L. Weston, who shortened the name to the Sonoma County Journal. That August, he took I.S. Church in as partner, but he left a year later.

On November 11, 1859, J. J. Pennypacker published the first issue of the Petaluma Argus. He closed the paper in May 1860 due to financial difficulties and sold his printing equipment to Samuel Cassiday, who then founded the Petaluma Republican. After six issues, Pennypacker was able to raise the money to buy back the plant revive the Argus in August 1860. That December, Pennypacker sold the Argus to A. Drouillard, who then partnered with Jas. N. McNabb in January 1861.

Drouillard retired and was succeeded in July 1861 by Cassiday. In November 1862, T.W. Abraham joined Weston at the Journal. The two sold the paper on February 1864 to McNabb and Cassiday, who merged it with the Argus to form the Petaluma Journal and Argus. McNabb left in June 1866 and Cassiday sold to Weston. J.E. Guild bought an interest in the paper in February 1870 and became business manager. That March, the paper's name was changed to the Journal and Argus, dropping the word "Petaluma." Guild sold to McNabb and N.W. Scudder in May 1871. McNabb soon left after he was appointed deputy collector for the Port of San Francisco. The paper was renamed on February 3, 1873 to the Petaluma Weekly Argus.

On October 15, 1876, W. M. Shattuck founded the Petaluma Weekly Courier. Professor E.S. Lippitt was editor. In 1879, Argus co-owner Scudder sold out to Cassiday. In 1883, Argus co-owner Weston sold out to Hart A. Downer. In 1884, J.T. Studdert started the Daily Morning Imprint with two others, but became the sole proprietor after six years. In November 1888, Shattuck sold the Courier to A.K. Woodbury and D.W. Ravenscroft. In early 1889, Cassiday sold his stake in the Argus to the Denman heirs, and McNabb followed that September. Two weeks later the Argus was acquired by George W. Heald. Woodbury left the Courier in mid-1889, and Ravenscroft sold out to W.A. Selkirk in November 1891. Selkirk sold to John Michaelsen in February 1893. That November, Michaelsen sold the Courier to George H. Crossette and Ravenscroft

In October 1894, Ashbury G. Smith bought the Courier, followed by the Imprint that December and merged the two. Felix G. Head bought out Smith in April 1895, and sold to Ravenscroft two months later. In 1900, the Argus was purchased by brothers Stephen H. and Cassius C. Olmstead, owners of the Marin Journal. In 1907, J.C. Arthur and two others bought the Courier. He sold it in January 1912 to E.A. Avery. Ravenscroft returned five months later and then sold the Courier to Homer W. Wood. In December 1927, Wood sold the Petaluma Courier to the Olmsted Company. In July 1928, the two papers were consolidated to form the Petaluma Argus-Courier.

In 1965, the Olmsted family sold the paper to Scripps League Newspapers. In 1993, the paper, which had been daily since 1928, cut down to a two-day a week schedule, citing financial pressures. The move left Santa Rosa's Press Democrat as the county's only daily. In 1996, Pulitzer Publishing Company bought Scripps League for about $230 million. In 2001, The New York Times Company bought the Argus-Courier. In 2012, the company sold its regional papers to Halifax Media. Later that year, Sonoma Media, a local investment group formed to buy the Sonoma Index-Tribune, purchased the Argus-Courier and The Press Democrat from Halifax. In 2025, the three papers were acquired by MediaNews Group.

== National coverage and awards ==
Argus-Courier reporting has been featured in national news reporting, as with the story of Petaluma resident Polly Klaas's murder, where the paper served as a source of reporting, and its staff served as commentators on the culture of the town.

In 2017, the Petaluma Argus-Courier won 1st place in the General Excellence category in its division of California's Better Newspapers Contest, as well as awards in environmental reporting, breaking news, and online photo essays.
