= KWVF =

- Guerneville, California; United States
- Broadcast area: Sonoma County, California
- Frequency: 102.7 MHz
- Branding: 102.7 The Wolf

Programming
- Format: Classic hits

Ownership
- Owner: Lawrence V. Amaturo; (Amaturo Sonoma Media Group, LLC)
- Sister stations: KFGY; KHTH; KSRO; KVRV; KZST

History
- First air date: 2012
- Call sign meaning: Wolf

Technical information
- Licensing authority: FCC
- Facility ID: 190436
- Class: A
- ERP: 1,600 watts
- HAAT: 197 meters (646 ft)
- Transmitter coordinates: 38°29′20″N 123°1′53″W

Links
- Public license information: Public file; LMS
- Webcast: Listen live
- Website: kwvf.com

KWVF (102.7 FM) is a radio station broadcasting a classic hits format. Licensed to Guerneville, California, United States, the station serves the Santa Rosa area. The station is currently owned by Lawrence V. Amaturo, through licensee Amaturo Sonoma Media Group, LLC.

In June 2022, it was announced that KWVF and sister stations KZST, K256DA, and K273CU would be sold by Redwood Empire Stereocasters to Amaturo Sonoma Media Group for $6 million. The sale was consummated on December 1, 2022.
