= KHTH =

Coordinates: 38.509°N 122.662°W

Santa Rosa, California; United States
- Broadcast area: Sonoma County
- Frequency: 101.7 MHz (HD Radio)
- Branding: Hot 101.7

Programming
- Format: Top 40 (CHR)
- Affiliations: Compass Media Networks; Premiere Networks

Ownership
- Owner: Lawrence Amaturo; (LLC)
- Sister stations: KFGY; KSRO; KVRV; KWVF; KZST

History
- First air date: 1974; 52 years ago
- Former call signs: KVRE-FM (1974–1988); KXFX (1988-2011)
- Former frequencies: 99.3 MHz (1974–1977)

Technical information
- Licensing authority: FCC
- Facility ID: 22890
- Class: B1
- ERP: 2,200 watts
- HAAT: 321 meters (1,053 ft)

Links
- Public license information: Public file; LMS
- Webcast: Listen Live
- Website: hot1017.com

KHTH (101.7 FM) is a commercial radio station in Santa Rosa, California, broadcasting a contemporary hit radio (Top 40/CHR) radio format. It is owned by Lawrence Amaturo.

== History ==
The station was originally KXFX and previously had an active rock format branded as 101.7 The Fox. On March 24, 2011, the call sign changed from KXFX to KHTH and changed from an active rock format to a CHR format as Hot 101.7.

== HD Radio ==
On July 30, 2022, the station's HD2 subchannel changed its format from classic hits as "K-Hits 107.9" to oldies as "Oldies 107.9".

On March 29, 2025 at midnight, KHTH-HD2 ceased operations.
