= KVRV =

Radio station in Monte Rio, California

Coordinates: 38.540°N 122.962°W

- Monte Rio, California; United States
- Broadcast area: Santa Rosa, California
- Frequency: 97.7 MHz
- Branding: 97.7 The River

Programming
- Format: Classic rock
- Affiliations: United Stations Radio Networks

Ownership
- Owner: Lawrence Amaturo; (Amaturo Sonoma Media Group, LLC)
- Sister stations: KFGY, KHTH, KSRO, KWVF, KZST

History
- First air date: November 20, 1977 (as KRJB)
- Former call signs: KRJB (1977–1986); KKBR (1/7/1986-1/16/1986); KMGG (1986–2003)
- Call sign meaning: K V RiVer

Technical information
- Licensing authority: FCC
- Facility ID: 51218
- Class: B1
- ERP: 2,050 watts
- HAAT: 342 meters

Links
- Public license information: Public file; LMS
- Webcast: Listen Live
- Website: 977theriver.com

KVRV (97.7 FM, "The River") is a commercial radio station licensed to Monte Rio, California, broadcasting to the Santa Rosa, California area.

KVRV airs a classic rock music format branded as "The River" (a local reference to the Russian River). Their studios are in Santa Rosa. The station's previous call letters were KMGG, and the station played oldies music from 1986 to 2003.
