= Petaluma High School =

Public high school in California, United States

Coordinates: 38°13′37″N 122°38′46″W

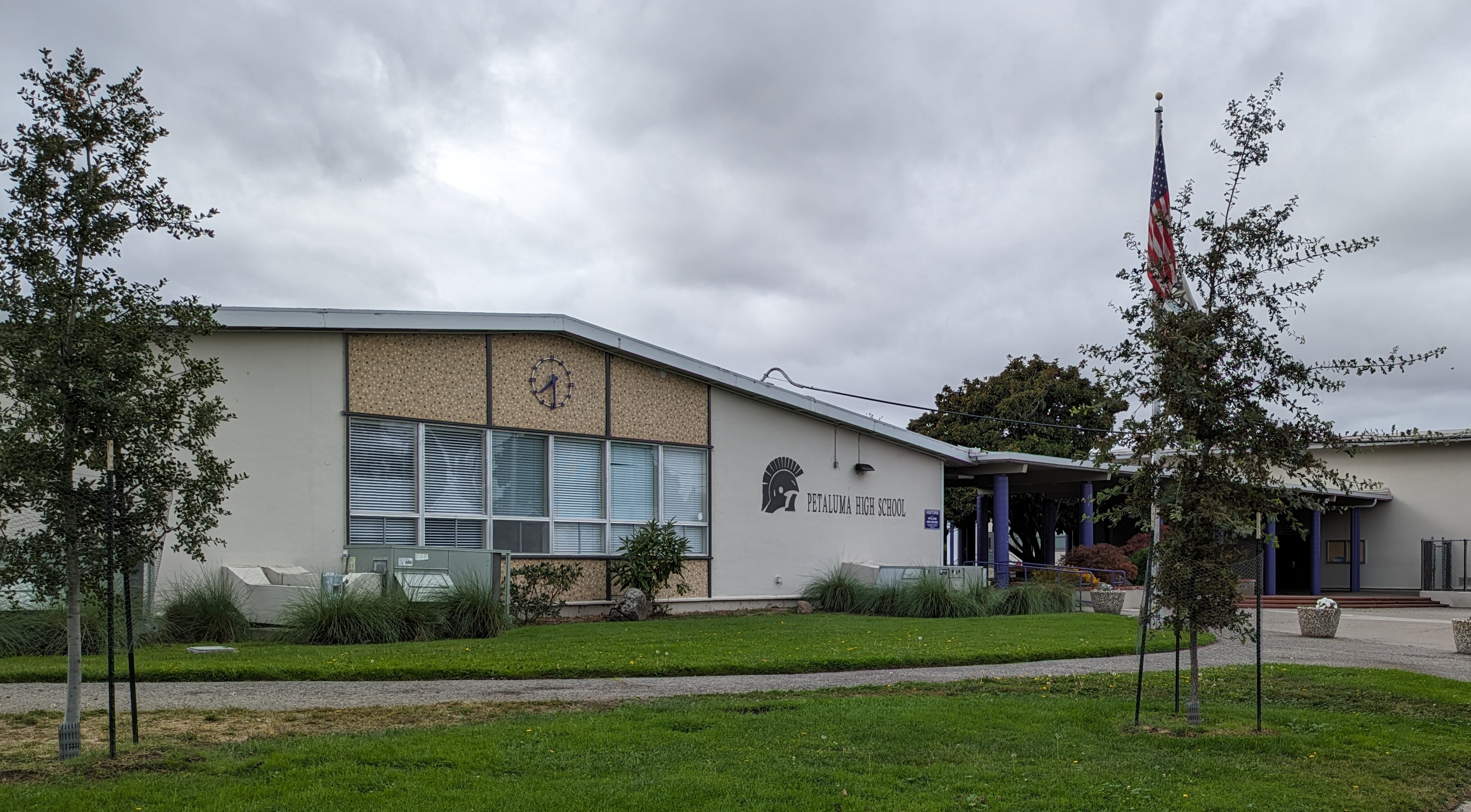

Location
- 201 Fair Street; Petaluma, California 94952; United States

Information
- Type: Public
- School district: Petaluma City Schools
- Principal: Giovanni Napoli
- Enrollment: 1,253 (2023–2024)
- Colors: Purple & White
- Team name: Trojans
- Newspaper: The Trojan Tribune
- Yearbook: The Enterprise
- Website: petalumacityschools.org/petalumahigh/

Petaluma High School is a four-year public high school in Petaluma, California. The school's enrollment area is the west side of Petaluma and many of the rural areas that surround the city in Sonoma County and Marin County. In 1992, Petaluma High was named a California Distinguished School.

== Academics ==
Petaluma High School has a graduation rate of 96.33% as of 2011, with 37.2% of students satisfying the requirements for admission to either the University of California or the California State University system. The average class sizes are 30 for Math, 25 for Science and English, and 30 for Social Science. Per the Standardized Testing and Reporting (STAR) Program, 66% of students in English, 30% in Math 69% in Science, and 62% in Social Science scored as Proficient or Advanced. It offers Advanced Placement courses in 15 subjects: English Composition/Literature, Spanish Literature, Calculus A/B, Calculus B/C, Statistics, Biology, Chemistry, Physics, Environmental Science, World History, U.S. History, Macroeconomics, Psychology, American Government, and Art.

The school (along with Casa Grande High School) is set to a “block schedule”, in which there are only three classes (or four, if students choose to take a class before school known as “zero period”) per day. Beginning in Fall 2025 Petaluma High School will move to a seven-class fixed schedule with all seven classes meeting on Monday and alternating blocks Tuesday through Friday.

== History ==
Petaluma High School was established as a public school in 1873, making it one of the oldest high schools in California. Sitting on approximately 24 acres, the current campus was completed in 1935 with the main building remodeled in December 2001. A new science and math building was completed in October 2000. Modernization of the D-Wing building was completed during the summer of 2005.

During the 2009–2010 school year, the new Arts, Media and Entertainment building was opened. The entertainment program includes education in digital and print photography with a full service laboratory. Students interested in filmmaking partake in the film program, while those interested in drawing, painting, sculpture, ceramics, and other art forms participate in the core Art program that culminates in AP Art.

== Athletics ==
Petaluma High School is a Division III school and one of seven members of the Vine Valley Athletic League of the North Coast Section. PHS offers boys sports programs in Badminton, Baseball, Basketball, Cross Country, Football, Golf, Soccer, Swimming, Tennis, Track, and Wrestling. Girls programs include Cross Country, Golf, Soccer, Softball, Swimming, Tennis, Track, and Volleyball.

In 2009, Petaluma High football had one of its most successful seasons in years, finishing the season 12-1 and making it to the North Coast Section Division 2 quarterfinals. They lost in the quarterfinals to Eureka High School. Steve Ellison was the coach of Petaluma High football for the previous 31 seasons and retired after the 2009 season. Coach Ellison's overall coaching record at Petaluma High and Sacred Heart of San Francisco was 218–173–7.

In 2011, Petaluma High School's softball team won the NCS Championship. They were unable to defend their title their title the following year, falling one run short in 2012.

During the 2015-16 year, the boys basketball team had one of their most successful seasons since 1992. The team won 19 games under head coach Scott Behrs, defeating Casa Grande High School for the first time in six years, defeating Cardinal Newman High School, and winning the Sonoma County League Postseason Tournament Championship over league rival Analy High School 27–26 at Haehl Pavilion. Behrs is the coach with the highest winning percentage at Petaluma High School in the last 20 years.

The Egg Bowl is a significant tradition at Petaluma High School. In 2017, the Egg Bowl was brought back to the town of Petaluma for the first time since 2011. Casa Grande and Petaluma High Schools played on September 16, 2017. Petaluma won the game 20–14. In the following year's Egg Bowl, Casa Grande trailed by 14 points entering the 4th quarter, but came back with 35 seconds left on a 40-yard touchdown pass, and converted a two-point conversion to win the game 37–36.

In the 2022 Egg Bowl, the score remained one score the entire game, with Petaluma taking a 28–21 lead with around 10 minutes to go. This was followed by a Petaluma interception with 6 minutes left in the final quarter. However, a failed call on fourth down gave Casa Grande the ball with 3 minutes left. They scored a touchdown with 2 minutes left and successfully completed a two-point conversion to take the lead 29–28. Petaluma failed to respond and Casa Grande won the game.

== Activities ==
=== Clubs ===
Clubs at Petaluma High include local chapters of the California Scholarship Federation, Future Farmers of America (FFA), and Future Business Leaders of America

=== Wildlife Museum ===
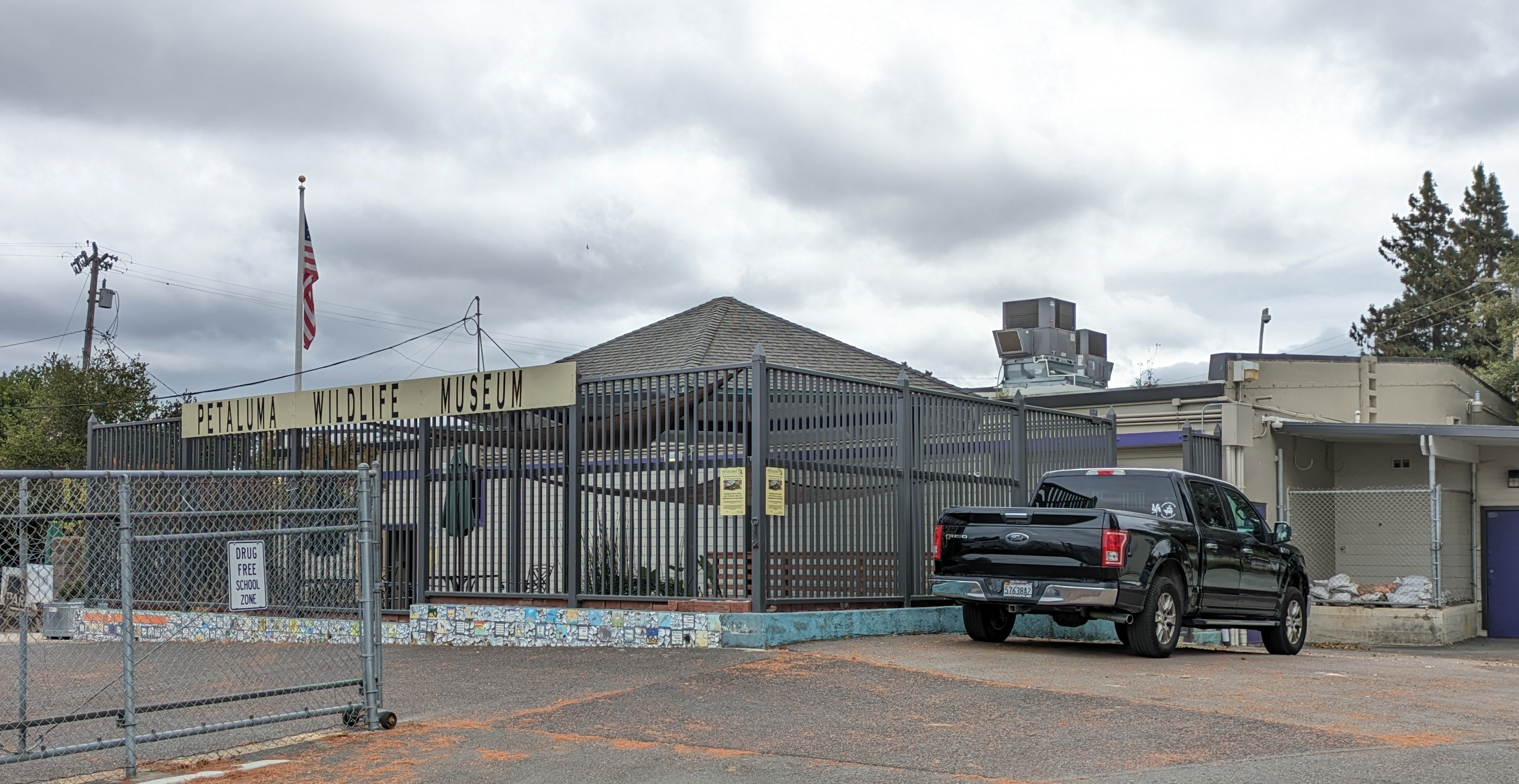
Petaluma Wildlife Museum

Petaluma High School is the home of the Petaluma Wildlife Museum, one of the few museums in the country that is solely run by students. Through the Wildlife Museum, students can take classes on Wildlife Management and Museum Management.

The Museum houses over 50 species of insects, reptiles, amphibians, and mammals. Thousands of people visit the Museum every year where dozens of high school students provide tours and animal education. Each school year, the Museum hosts several high school classes, educating over 100 teens about a variety of wildlife related subjects. Students take rigorous courses in Wildlife and Museum Management to learn about environmental education, wildlife biology, animal husbandry, public speaking, and museum operations and maintenance. Additionally, throughout the school year, student docents are responsible for animal care, museum maintenance, program development and conducting tours.

Over the course of 20 years, the Museum has hosted thousands of school classes and community groups, teaching them about biodiversity, ecosystems, wildlife, animal adaptations and natural history. Tours are conducted by trained high school docents and are developed around California State Science Standards. Grade school tours visit exhibits representing Africa, Asia, and North and South America. Students also explore large mineral, fossil, and forestry displays. Hundreds of taxidermied and live animals engage children and bring the science lessons alive.

=== Manufacturing program ===
Petaluma High's Manufacturing Technology program is the only NIMS (National Institute for Metalworking Skills) accredited high school program in the state of California. In 2022, Petaluma High joined the NASA Hunch program and manufacture parts for the international space station, and parts for other NASA missions.

== Facilities and administration ==
The campus consists of 83 classrooms, a wildlife museum, auto shop, wood shop, metal shop, and an agricultural shop. Athletic facilities include a gymnasium; baseball, football, and softball fields; weight room; and swimming pool.

The staff at Petaluma High includes 70 certificated teachers, four academic counselors, a Project Success counselor, a full-time librarian, a Safe School Support Specialist, three administrators, and 50 classified support staff members. In addition, it has a school nurse, two school psychologists, a speech and language specialist, bilingual support services, and instructional assistants in special education.

== Sexual assault controversy ==
In 2018, school officials cut the microphone of the 2018 valedictorian "before she could speak about being sexually assaulted"—after being warned not to—during her commencement speech. A superintendent responded: "Many of the assertions...do not match our perspective."

== Notable alumni ==
- Alex Consani - supermodel
- Ben Bostrom - motorcycle racer
- Lloyd Bridges - actor
- Frank Pierce Doyle - banker and philanthropist, known as the "Father of the Golden Gate Bridge"
- Richard D. Hearney - Marine Corps 4-Star General
- Biff Hoffman - football player
- Duke Iversen - football player
- Brett Johnson - screenwriter
- Tom Moore - meet director of the Modesto Relays
- Bill Pronzini - mystery writer
- Winona Ryder - actress
- Konrad Schmidt - catcher for the Arizona Diamondbacks
- Virginia Strom-Martin - California State Assemblywoman
- Joe Decker - baseball player
