= Petaluma Wildlife & Natural Science Museum =

Museum in Petaluma, California

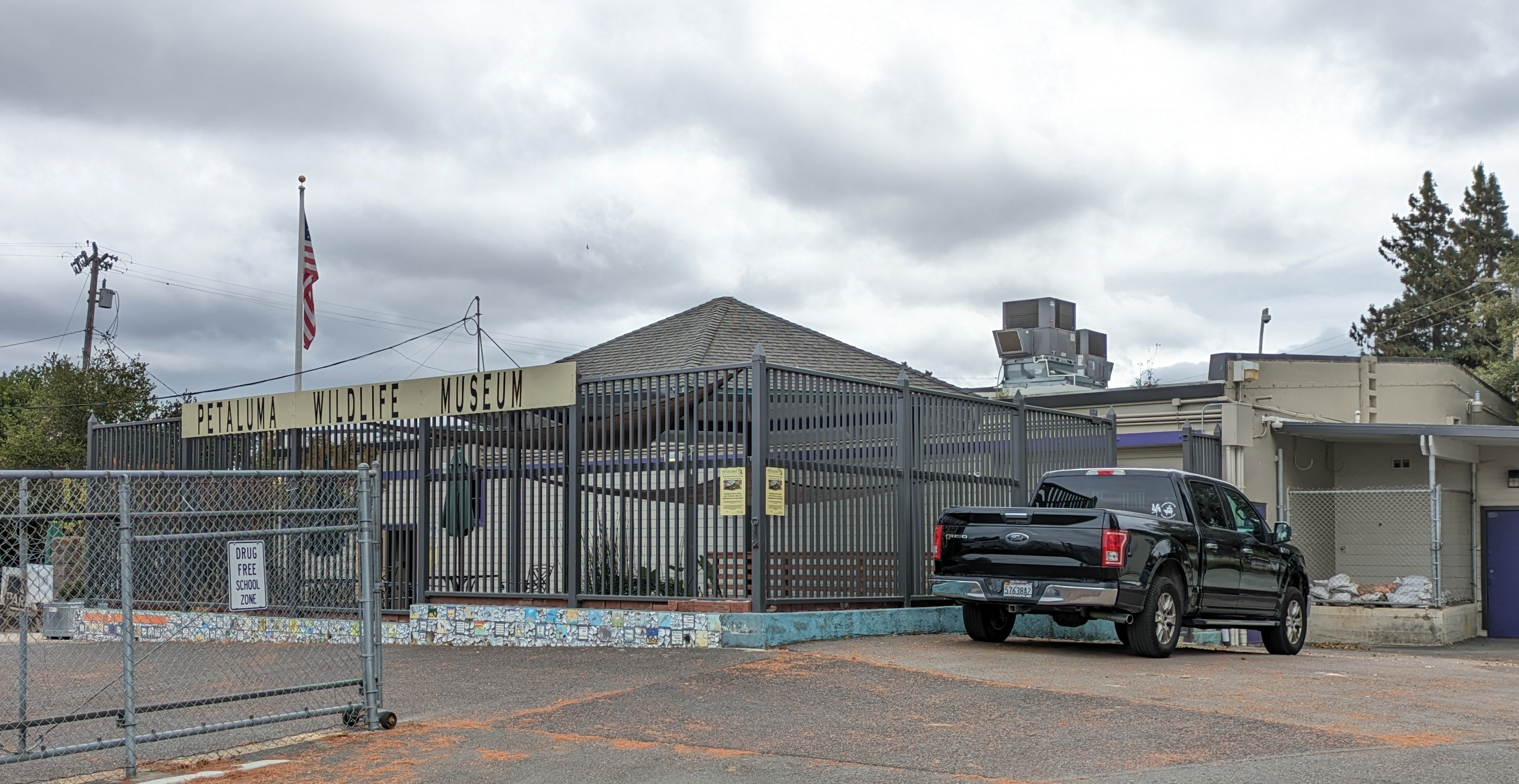
- Location: Petaluma, California, USA
- Coordinates: 38°13′40″N 122°38′46″W
- Website: www.petalumawildlifemuseum.org

Petaluma Wildlife & Natural Science Museum is a student-run museum located in the city of Petaluma, California. It is the largest student-run museum in the United States. Its mission is "to inspire the next generation through practical environmental education and conservation." It is a 501(c)3 non-profit organization, relying on donations to fund expenses. The museum is located on the Petaluma High School campus, in which a "Wildlife Management" and a "Museum Management" class can be taken as an elective.

The collection includes dozens of several live species, such as snakes, lizards, chinchillas; as well as taxidermy.

The current teacher at the Petaluma Wildlife Museum is Phil Tacata, who has shifted the focus of tours to conservation of wildlife and the preservation of habitats around the planet.

== History ==
The museum started as a classroom, which was taught by Ron Head. In 1989, Hugh Codding donated the entire Codding Museum inventory to Head. When the collection outgrew the classroom, the Codding family purchased a new bus garage, which freed up the old one on the school campus to be turned into a 9000 square foot museum. It was Head's dream to help hone high school students in career, leadership, and management skills. "I saw what kids could do and how a museum could motivate kids," Head said.

== Tours ==
The tours are usually given to elementary children by high school docents. The tours typically last an hour to an hour and a half long, depending on the age of the children. Docents guide a group through about seven rooms. Conservation and preservation are the primary focus of the tour. Topics that are discussed include camouflage, animal adaptations, fossil history, invasive species, natural history, as well as live animal presentations.

During Saturdays, when the museum is open to the public, visitors roam the museum and ask questions, as well as being able to see more animals.

== Structure ==
The museum is a 501(c)3 non-profit organization, with donations from the community helping to support it. The museum is run by a board of directors, which set the agenda for the museum. The board president is Casey Brechbill, while the executive director is Neal Ramus. The museum is maintained by the students, who gain volunteer service hours and experience in fields of biology, animal maintenance, as well as business experience.

The students at the school can take a "Wildlife Management" class, which is an introductory to wildlife topics, such as fauna biology, husbandry, and topics such as the ecosystem and conservation. The secondary class is "Museum Maintenance", which allows students to become docents and gives them hands on experience working with animals. Kim Arntz teaches both classes.

== Controversies ==
In 2010 ABC 7 made allegations that the museum's director, Marsi Wier, had misused museum funds for personal expenses. As a result, Wier was removed by the board as curator and director, and later lost her job as teacher. Neal Ramus became the director, while Kim Arntz became the teacher and Jordan James the curator.

== Summer Camp ==
The museum runs a summer camp program for children ages 5 to 12. The camp sessions last a week long each, with docents supervising the campers. The camp has activities that teach animal behavior, ecology, conservation, and science; presentations are given as well by docents and visiting speakers.

== Lead Docents ==
Kayla Pearson & Sebastian Gonzalez (2018-2020) were the first two students to be donned the title of "Lead Docent" by Phil Tacata. Sebastian Gonzalez is the namesake of the Gonzales Tortoise Garden.

Devin Bach and Riley Hammack (2019-2020) were two amazing docents hand picked by Tacata to receive the second round of Lead Docent titles. These two could often be found visiting the museum after graduating.

Bailey Moeller and Zoey Hanes (2021-2022) were some of the best docents to ever pass through the museum, also making it onto Phil Tacata's Whale Wall in Marine Science.

Bruno Belforte and Cydney Doyle (2022-2023) were the up and coming lead docents coming out of the COVID-19 pandemic, these two were able to learn and master the tour very quickly in order to meet Phil Tacata's standards for lead docent in their first year in the museum program.

Mia Vaughn and Phoebe Hornstein (2023) were two additions Tacata made to the official lead docent roster late into the 2023 school year. These two amazing docents both mastered their own unique parts of the tour and became well known for their professionalism and presenting skills.

Carles Montijano (2021-2023). Carles is receiving an honorary title of lead docent despite not making it onto the museum website, as he worked just as hard if not harder than any other docent on this list. He was a stellar addition to the museum roster in every tour that he attended, of which there were many.

Grason Mentzer, Renée Machado, Yasmin Romo-Macias, Natalie Frances, Molly Smith, Reid Harrison, Lucienne Hight, Charles Scott and Isabella Prandi (2023–present) are the nine amazing Lead Docents chosen to fill the shoes of the many before them. Between the nine of them, you can expect one of the most spectacular and amazing tours that has ever been given at the PWM.
