= KFGY =

Radio station in Healdsburg, California

Coordinates: 38.762°N 122.841°W

- Healdsburg, California; United States
- Broadcast area: Sonoma County, California
- Frequency: 92.9 MHz
- Branding: Froggy 92.9

Programming
- Format: Country
- Affiliations: Premiere Networks; Westwood One

Ownership
- Owner: Lawrence Amaturo; (Amaturo Sonoma Media Group, LLC)
- Sister stations: KHTH, KSRO, KVRV, KWVF, KZST

History
- First air date: December 21, 1979 (as KREO)
- Former call signs: KREO (1979–1989); KHTT (1989–1993); KVVV (1993–1996)
- Call sign meaning: "Froggy"

Technical information
- Licensing authority: FCC
- Facility ID: 22879
- Class: B
- ERP: 2,300 watts
- HAAT: 594 meters (1,949 ft)

Links
- Public license information: Public file; LMS
- Webcast: Listen Live
- Website: froggy929.com

KFGY (92.9 FM) is a commercial radio station licensed to Healdsburg, California, broadcasting to the Santa Rosa, California, area.

KFGY airs a country music format branded as "Froggy 92.9".
