= The Press Democrat =

Daily newspaper published in Santa Rosa, California

Coordinates: 38.441743°N 122.714944°W

- The February 28, 2012, front page of The Press Democrat
- Type: Daily newspaper
- Format: Broadsheet
- Owner: MediaNews Group
- Editor: John D'Anna, Interim Executive Editor
- Founded: 1897 (as the Sonoma Democrat)
- Headquarters: 416 B Street; Santa Rosa, California 95401
- Circulation: 20,000 Daily; 25,000 Sunday; 18,000 Digital Only (as of 2023)
- Sister newspapers: Sonoma Index-Tribune, Argus-Courier
- ISSN: 0747-220X
- Website: pressdemocrat.com
- Free online archives: cdnc.ucr.edu (1875-1928)

The Press Democrat is a daily newspaper published in Santa Rosa, California.

== History ==
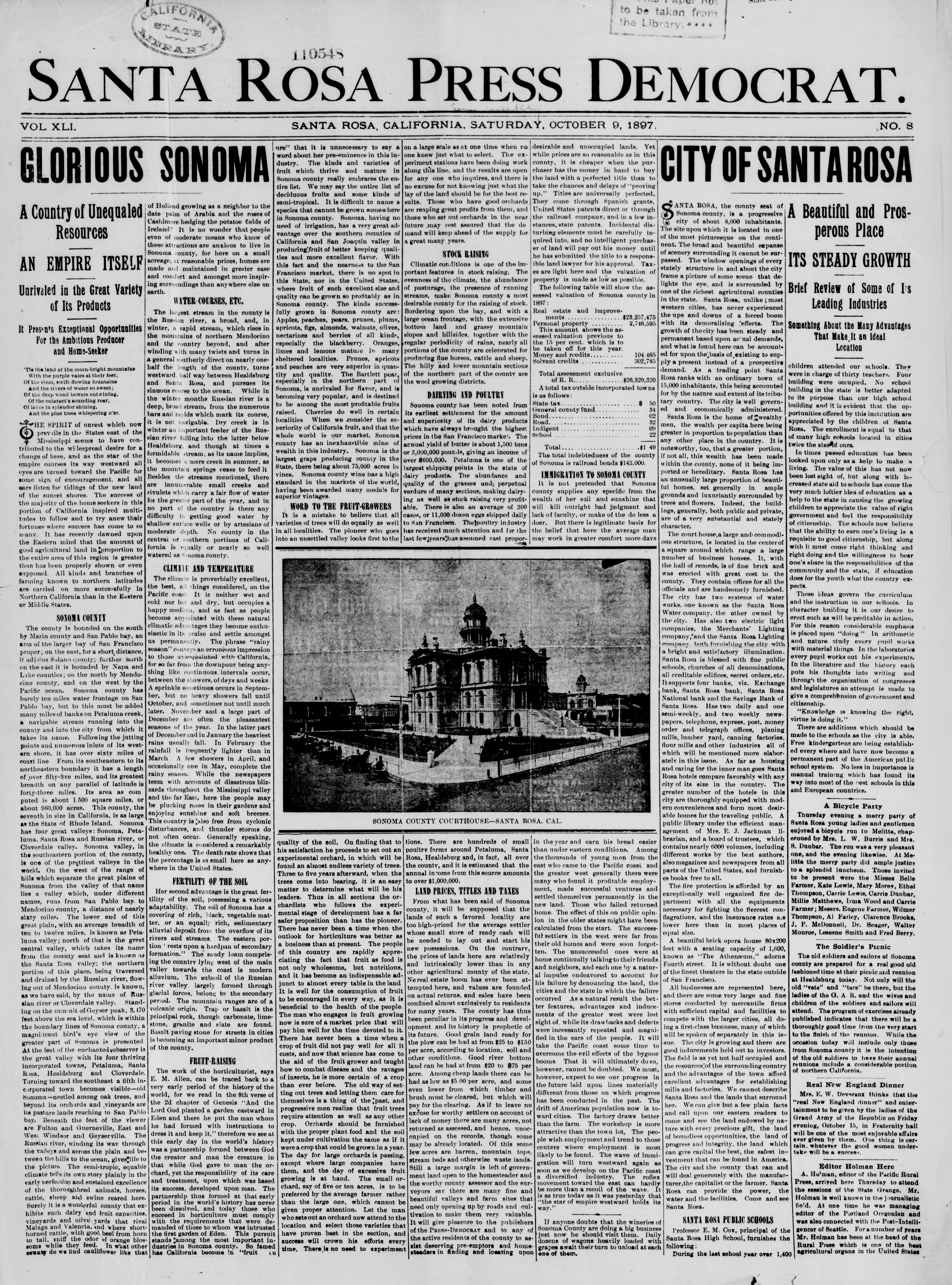
The front page of The Press Democrat's first issue, published October 9, 1897

On January 2, 1896, the first edition of The Evening Press was published in Santa Rosa, California. The newspaper was founded by Ernest L. Finley, Grant Richards, and Charles O. Dunbar, who on October 7, 1897, merged their Evening Press with Thomas Thompson's Sonoma Democrat (originally created as a voice for the Democratic Party). The paper bought the Santa Rosa Republican in 1927.

Finley eventually acquired sole ownership and published the paper until his death in 1942. The paper was then passed on to his widow Ruth Woolsey Finley, daughter Ruth Finley Person and son-in-law Evert B. Person. In 1948, the Republican was consolidated into the Press Democrat.

After Mrs. Finley died in 1985, Evert Person sold the paper to The New York Times Company. The sale included The Healdsburg Tribune. At that time the Press Democrat had a daily circulation of 73,000. In 2001, company bought the Argus-Courier, and in 2012 sold its regional papers to Halifax Media.

Later that year, Sonoma Media, a local investment group formed to buy the Sonoma Index-Tribune, purchased the Argus-Courier and The Press Democrat from Halifax. The ownership group included former congressman Douglas H. Bosco, Jean Schulz, the widow of Peanuts comic strip creator Charles M. Schulz, and Norma Betz Person, widow of The Press Democrat's former publisher Evert Person.

In 2019, Sonoma Media Investments acquired the Sonoma County Gazette of Forestville, a monthly newspaper. In 2025, the business sold its papers to MediaNews Group.

== Gaye LeBaron ==
The most popular feature in The Press Democrat for many years was Gaye LeBaron's community column, according to a readership survey. LeBaron produced more than 8,000 columns between 1961 and her semi-retirement in 2001, writing on human interest, cultural events, ethnic history and local politics.

== Awards and honors ==
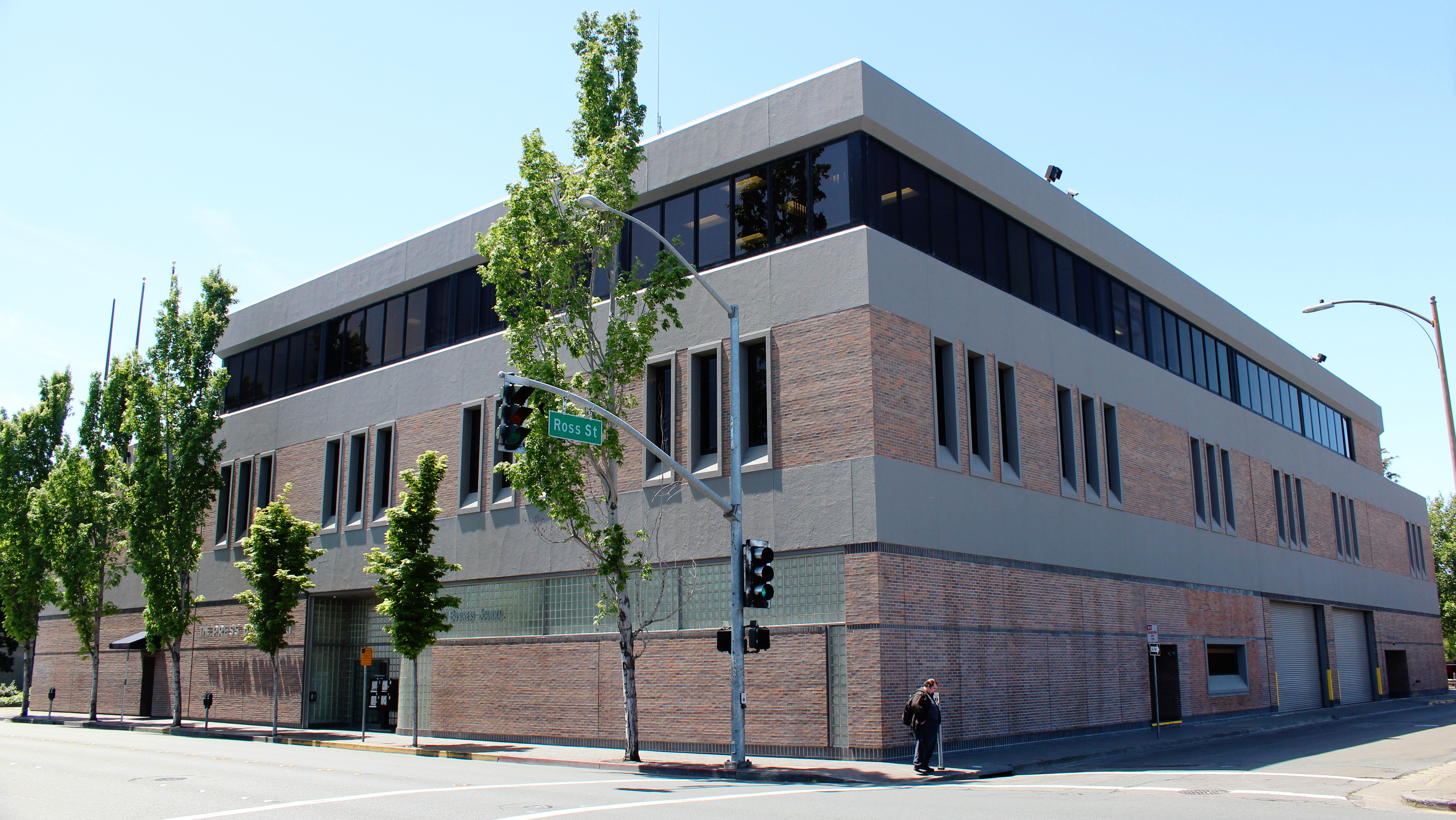
The Press Democrat headquarters in Santa Rosa in 2016

The Press Democrat's staff was the winner of the 2018 Pulitzer Prize for Breaking News Reporting for "[f]or lucid and tenacious coverage of historic wildfires that ravaged the city of Santa Rosa and Sonoma County." Former staff photographer Annie Wells also won the 1997 Pulitzer Prize for Spot News Photography "for her dramatic photograph of a local firefighter rescuing a teenager from raging floodwaters."

The newspaper was also the 2004 recipient of the George Polk Award for Regional Reporting, given annually by Long Island University to honor contributions to journalistic integrity and investigative reporting.
