= Sonoma Index-Tribune =

Weekly newspaper published in Sonoma, California

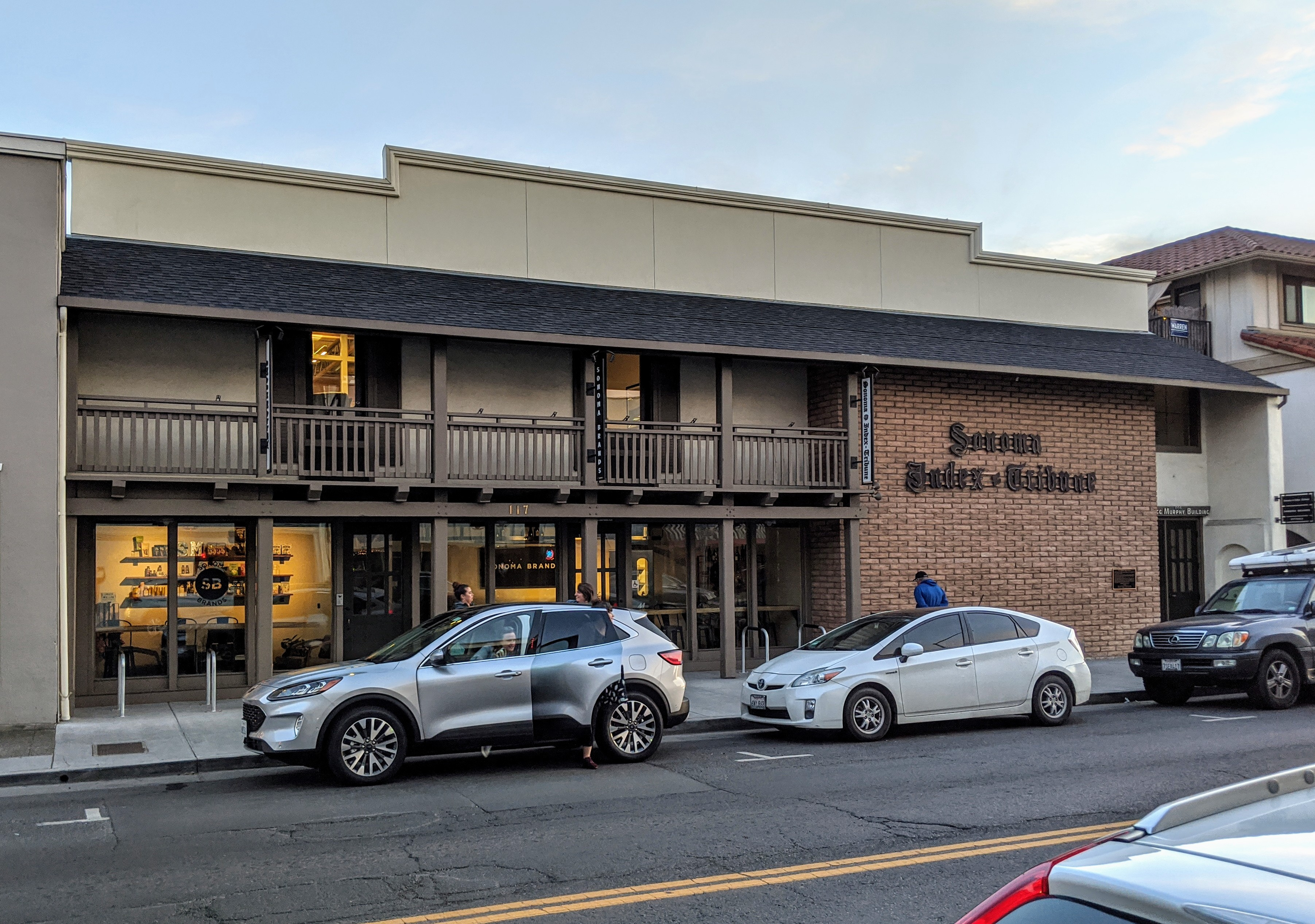
- Offices of the Sonoma Index-Tribune in 2020
- Type: Weekly paper
- Owner: MediaNews Group
- Founder: Benjamin Frank
- Publisher: Emily Charrier
- Editor: Jason Walsh
- Founded: 1879; 147 years ago
- Language: English
- City: Sonoma, California
- Country: United States
- Sister newspapers: The Press Democrat, Argus-Courier
- ISSN: 8755-9498
- OCLC number: 11429595
- Website: sonomanews.com

The Sonoma Index-Tribune is a community newspaper published weekly in Sonoma, California. The newspaper was published by four generations of the same family for 128 years and has been owned by MediaNews Group since 2025.

== History ==
In 1879, the Sonoma Index was founded by Benjamin Frank, formerly of the Reading Independent. The newspaper changed ownership about a dozen times in its first five years. After Frank, the paper was edited by Frank Merritt, A. J. Drahms, W. Merlin-Jones and then E. J. Livernash. In 1884, Harry H. Granice bought the paper and renamed it to the Sonoma Index-Tribune. Granice brought stability to the paper. In 1889, he founded the San Rafael Independent, and sold it in 1903. Granice published and edited the Index-Tribune until his death in 1915. His step-son Walter G. Bonner, who worked as business manager died later that year. Granice's widow, the mother of Bonner, put the paper up for auction.

The highest bid was from Celeste Granice Murphy, Granice's eldest daughter. She then took control of the Index-Tribune with her husband Walter L. Murphy. Celeste Murphy previously edited her father's paper in San Rafael and had expanded it from a weekly to a daily paper. The couple ran the Sonoma newspaper with Celeste serving as editor and Walter as business manager. Celeste Murphy authored "The People of the Pueblo: Or the Story of Sonoma," and was one of the founders of the relaunched Valley of The Moon Vintage Festival. The couple lived in the Sonoma Barracks.

In 1949, the Murphys sold the Index-Tribune to their nephew Robert M. Lynch, and retired. Lynch served in the U.S. Navy during World War II. He built the newspaper to 65 employees and expanded the circulation from 2,000 to 12,000. He later served as president of both the California Newspaper Publishers Association and the California Press Association. In 2002, Celeste Murphy was inducted into the California Newspaper Hall of Fame.

In 2003, Lynch died. His sons Bill Lynch and Jim Lynch then operated the paper as co-publishers, They retired in 2012 and sold the newspaper to outside investors. Four generations of the family had operated the Sonoma Index-Tribune for 128 years. The local investment group formed Sonoma Media and purchased The Press Democrat and Argus-Courier later that year from Halifax Media Group. In May 2025, the company sold all three papers to MediaNews Group. A few months later the Index-Tribune eliminated its Wednesday edition.
