= Thomas Larkin Thompson =

American politician (1838–1898)

Thomas L. Thompson
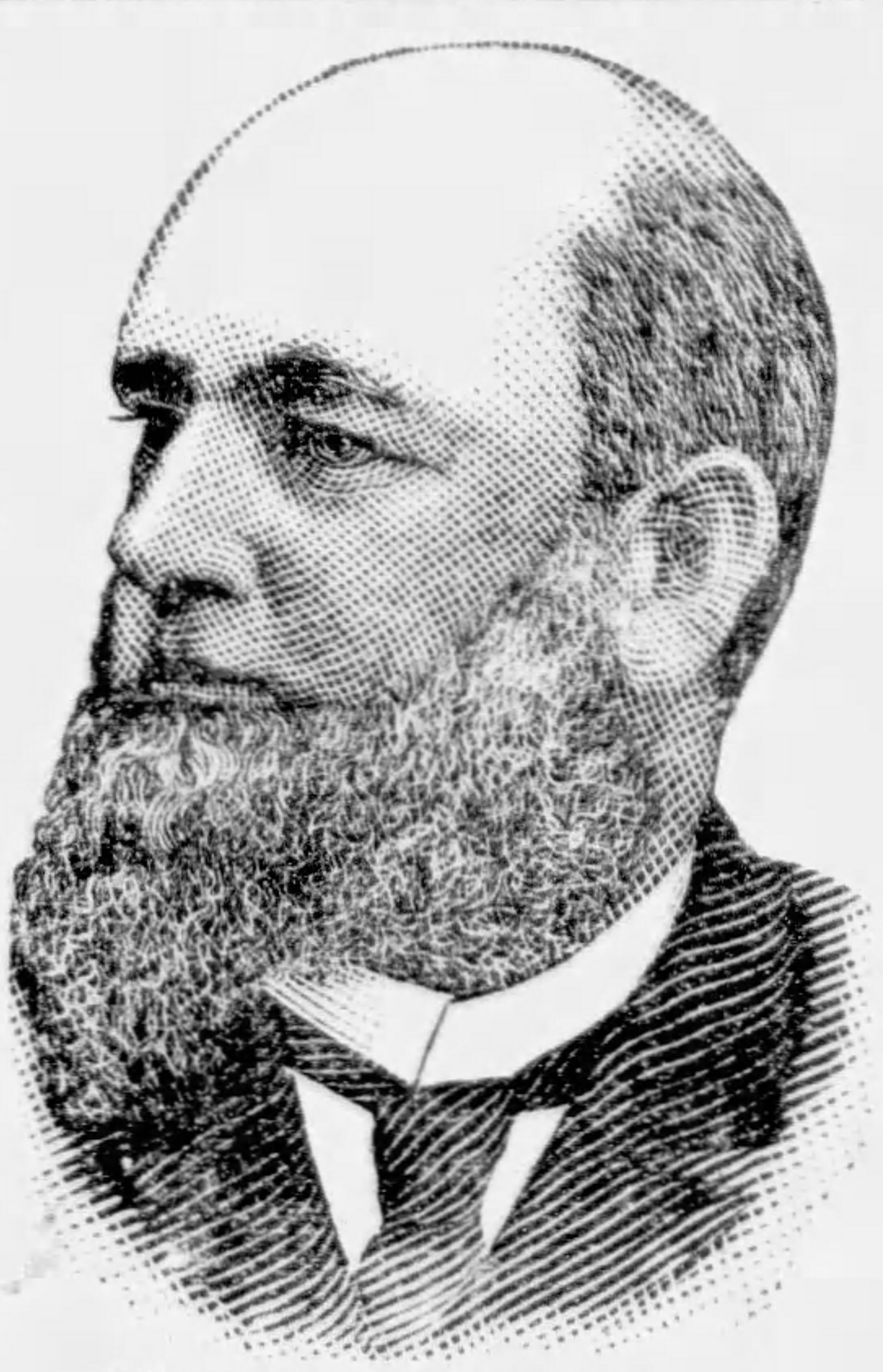
- Thompson c. 1887

14th Secretary of State of California
- In office January 10, 1883 – January 8, 1887
- Governor: George Stoneman
- Preceded by: Daniel M. Burns
- Succeeded by: William C. Hendricks

Member of the U.S. House of Representatives from California's 1st district
- In office March 4, 1887 – March 3, 1889
- Preceded by: Barclay Henley
- Succeeded by: John J. De Haven

United States Minister to Brazil
- In office September 9, 1893 – July 17, 1897
- President: Grover Cleveland
- Preceded by: Edwin H. Conger
- Succeeded by: Edwin H. Conger

Personal details
- Born: Thomas Larkin Thompson; May 31, 1838 Charleston, Virginia (now West Virginia)
- Died: February 1, 1898 (aged 59) Santa Rosa, California, U.S.
- Resting place: Santa Rosa Rural Cemetery
- Party: Democratic
- Parent: Robert A. Thompson (father)

Thomas Larkin Thompson (May 31, 1838 – February 1, 1898) was an American newspaperman and politician who served one term as a U.S. representative from California from 1887 to 1889. He was the son of Robert Augustine Thompson.

== Early life and career ==
Born in Charleston, Virginia (now West Virginia), Thompson attended the common schools and Buffalo Academy, Virginia (now West Virginia). He moved to California in 1855 and settled in Sonoma County. He established the Petaluma Journal (now the Argus-Courier) the same year. He purchased the Sonoma Democrat in 1860, and was the editor of that paper.

=== Early political activities ===
He served as delegate to the Democratic National Convention in 1880 and 1892, and was secretary of state of California from 1883 to 1887. He declined to be a candidate for renomination.

== Congress ==
Thompson was elected as a Democrat to the 50th United States Congress (March 4, 1887 – March 3, 1889). He was an unsuccessful candidate for re-election in 1888 to the 51st Congress.

== Later career and death ==
He was appointed on April 4, 1891, commissioner from California to the World's Fair at Chicago. He was minister to Brazil from April 24, 1893, to May 27, 1897.

=== Death ===
He died in Santa Rosa, California, February 1, 1898, and was interred in the Santa Rosa Rural Cemetery.

== Electoral results ==
1886 United States House of Representatives elections
Party	Candidate	Votes	%
Democratic	Thomas Larkin Thompson	16,499	50.1
Republican	Charles A. Garter	15,526	47.1
Prohibition	L. W. Simmons	849	2.6
Independent	Philip Cowen	80	0.2
Total votes		32,954	100.0
Democratic hold			

1888 United States House of Representatives elections
Party	Candidate	Votes	%
Republican	John J. De Haven	19,345	49.9
Democratic	Thomas Larkin Thompson (Incumbent)	19,019	49.0
Know Nothing	W. D. Reynolds	428	1.1
Total votes		38,792	100.0
Republican gain from Democratic			

== Sources ==
- United States Congress. "Thomas Larkin Thompson (id: T000219)". Biographical Directory of the United States Congress.

Political offices
Preceded by Daniel M. Burns	Secretary of State of California; 1883–1887	Succeeded by William C. Hendricks
U.S. House of Representatives
Preceded by Barclay Henley	Member of the U.S. House of Representatives from California's 1st congressional district March 4, 1887 – March 3, 1889	Succeeded by John J. De Haven
Diplomatic posts
Preceded by Edwin H. Conger	United States Minister to Brazil; 9 September 1893 – 17 July 1897	Succeeded by Edwin H. Conger
