= Buffalo Town Square Historic District =

Historic district in West Virginia, United States

- U.S. National Register of Historic Places
- U.S. Historic district
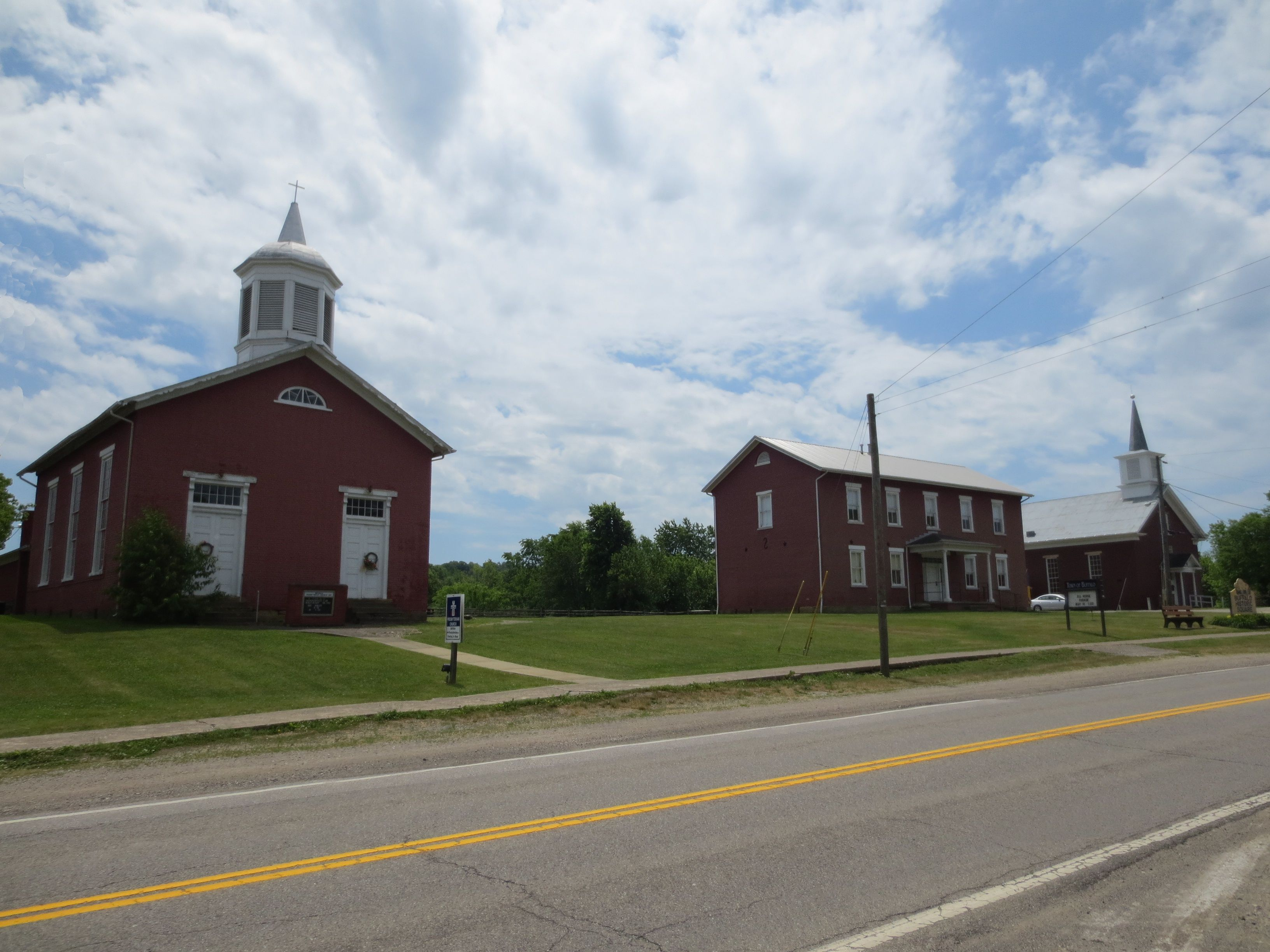

- Location within West Virginia Location within the United States
- Location: Jct. of WV 62 and High St., Buffalo, West Virginia
- Coordinates: 38°37′4″N 81°58′49″W
- Area: 2 acres (0.81 ha)
- Built: 1849
- Architectural style: Greek Revival
- NRHP reference No.: 91001009
- Added to NRHP: August 16, 1991

Buffalo Town Square Historic District is a national historic district located at Buffalo, Putnam County, West Virginia. It encompasses three contributing buildings all in the Greek Revival on the town square: the Buffalo Academy (1849), Buffalo Presbyterian Church (1857), and Buffalo Methodist Church (1870). The area was listed as a district on the National Register of Historic Places in 1991.

== Buffalo Academy ==
Buffalo Academy was a school until the American Civil War when it was used successively by the armies involved. It later was restored and utilized as part of the school district as a public high school and then as an elementary school until the 1950s. It has been restored by the Buffalo Historical Society and a historical marker commemorates the building's history. Alumni of the academy included Coin Harvey and General John McCausland. George Rosetter was the school's first principal.
