= Gaye LeBaron =

American columnist, teacher and historian

- Born: Gaye Theresa Andrews; 1935 (age 90–91); Humboldt County, California, U.S.
- Education: Santa Rosa Junior College; University of California, Berkeley (BA)
- Occupations: Newspaper columnist, local historian
- Spouse: John LeBaron
- Children: 2
- Writing career
- Years active: 1957–present
- Subjects: Local history, community events, local politics
- Notable works: Santa Rosa: A Nineteenth Century Town (1985); Santa Rosa: A Twentieth Century Town (1993) (as co-author)
- Notable awards: Sonoma County Woman of the Year, 2015

Gaye Theresa LeBaron (born 1935) is an American newspaper columnist, author, teacher, and local historian of Sonoma County, California. She wrote more than 8,000 columns for The Press Democrat from 1961 until her semi-retirement in 2001. She also co-authored two books on the history of Santa Rosa, California.

== Early life and education ==
Gaye Andrews was born in a small town by the Eel River in Humboldt County, California. She was named for her father, Guy Andrews, who died when she was seven. She moved with her mother to her stepfather's home in Boyes Hot Springs, Sonoma County, when she was 14.

She graduated from Sonoma Valley High School. She then attended Santa Rosa Junior College and transferred to the UC Berkeley, earning her B.A. in English and history.

== Career ==
She commented on things that make us angry, like the homes rising on the ridges around Santa Rosa, and the seasonal beauty of Sonoma County – mustard in spring vineyards and, in the fall, the brilliant yellow of the ginkgo trees along McDonald Avenue.

— "Voice of the Community", The Press Democrat,
March 18, 2001

During her college years, she interned at The Press Democrat in Santa Rosa for three summers. She planned to teach high school in Redding after graduation, but when a staff position opened at the newspaper in September 1957, she opted to take that instead. Initially she worked as a general assignment reporter. She wrote her first column for the November 23, 1959 issue, and in 1961 became the official community columnist. Between 1970 and 1974 she stayed home to raise her children, then renewed her daily column until her semi-retirement in January 2001. As of 2004 she was writing two Sunday columns a month.

By 2001, LeBaron had produced more than 8,000 columns for The Press Democrat, ranging from human interest to cultural events to ethnic history to local politics. At one point she published six columns a week. She was considered the "premier columnist" of the paper, and a readership survey confirmed that hers was "the most popular feature in the paper". She became a local celebrity. She was even mentioned by a fictional character in Greg Sarris' 1998 novel Watermelon Nights:

"Patrick's studying journalism," I said, then thought of Mother's limitations. "He wants to be a writer," I translated.

"I know, he told me," she said, "Like Gaye LeBaron. She tells about the goings-on."

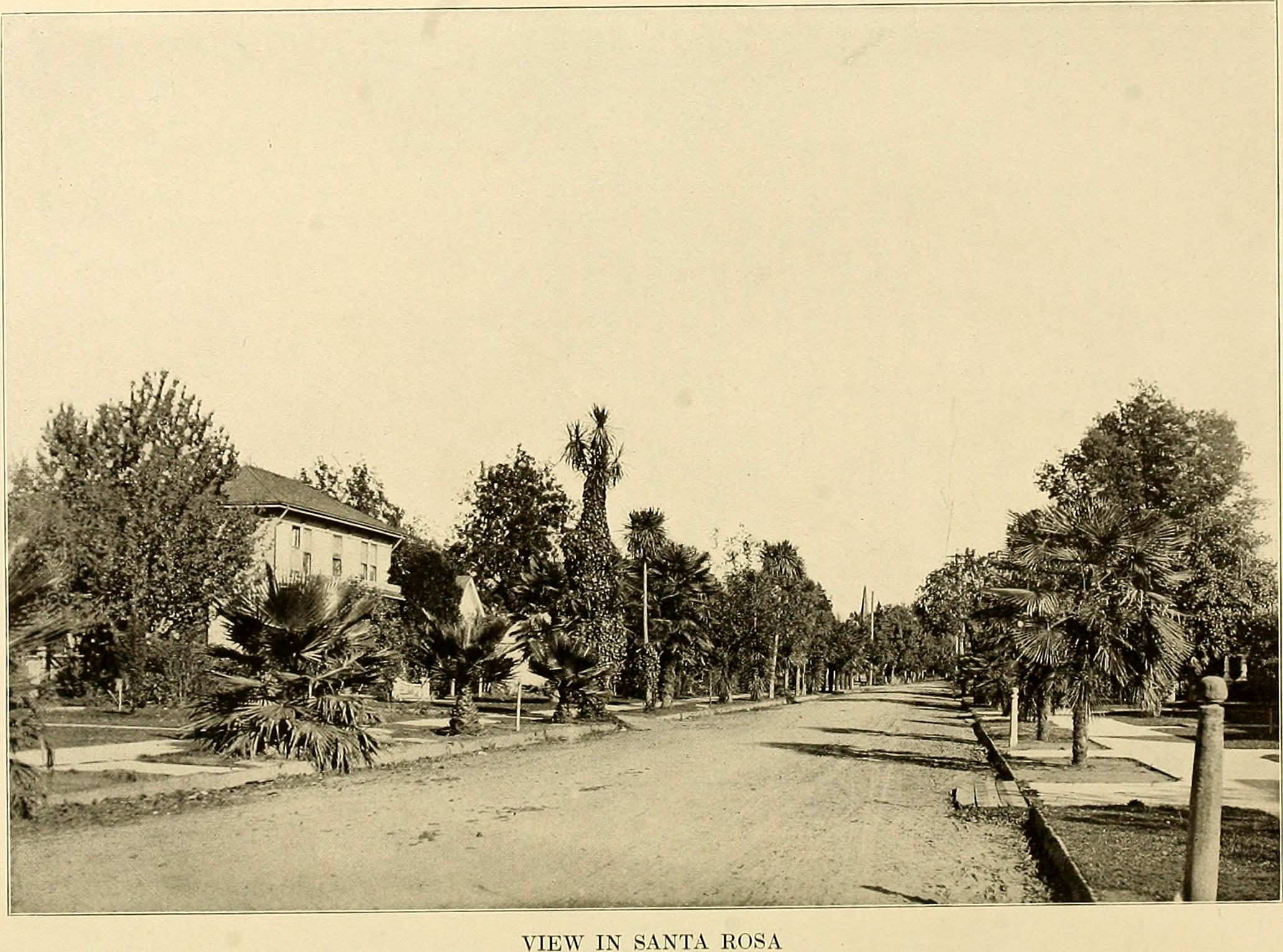
Santa Rosa, 1911

LeBaron co-authored two books on the history of Santa Rosa: Santa Rosa: A Nineteenth Century Town (Historia, Ltd., 1985) and Santa Rosa: A Twentieth Century Town (Historia, Ltd., 1993). She also taught Sonoma County history at Santa Rosa Junior College and at the Lifelong Learning Center at Sonoma State University. She appeared in two videos discussing Sonoma County history that aired on C-SPAN in 2015.

In 2001 LeBaron gifted her interview notes and research material to the Sonoma State University Library, which entered the material into its special collections department. In 2003 the library added the Gaye LeBaron Collection to its online catalog and also opened a Gaye LeBaron website for the use of students, researchers, and community organizations.

== Honors and awards ==
In 1984 LeBaron was honored as Grand Marshal of the Luther Burbank Rose Parade and Festival. U.S. Representative for California's 5th congressional district Mike Thompson named her Sonoma County Woman of the Year in 2015. In 2016 LeBaron received the California Community College Distinguished Alumni Award from the Community College League of California.

== Personal ==
When she joined The Press Democrat as a reporter in 1957, John LeBaron, seven years her senior, was working as a photographer for the paper. They married in 1958 and had two children. They resided in Santa Rosa and owned a beach house at Bodega Bay. He died in 2014.
