= Santa Rosa Junior College =

Community college in Santa Rosa, California, US

Coordinates: 38°27′19.08″N 122°43′11.14″W

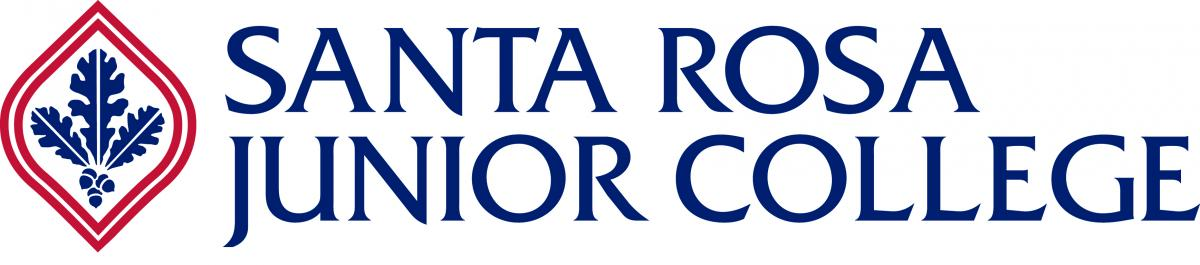
- Type: Public community college
- Established: 1918
- Parent institution: Sonoma County Junior College District
- President: Dr. Angelica Garcia
- Students: 22,299
- Location: Santa Rosa, California, United States
- Campus: Suburban, 80 acres (0.32 km^{2}) (main campus and Petaluma campus)
- Newspaper: The Oak Leaf
- Nickname: Bear Cubs
- Sporting affiliations: CCCAA
- Mascot: Rosco the Bear Cub
- Website: santarosa.edu

Santa Rosa Junior College (SRJC) is a public community college in Santa Rosa, California with an additional campus in Petaluma and centers in surrounding Sonoma County. SRJC is governed by the Sonoma County Junior College District.

== History ==
Founded in 1918, Santa Rosa Junior College is the tenth oldest community college in the state. It was planned as a feeder school for the University of California system, a "junior" version of the nearby University of California, Berkeley, with its Bear Cub mascot modeled after UCB's Oski. After just over a century, only six presidents have served SRJC: Floyd P. Bailey (1921–1957), Randolph Newman (1957–1970), Roy Mikalson (1971–1990), Robert F. Agrella (1990–2012), Frank Chong (2012–2023), and Maria Angélica Garcia (2023–present).

President Newman established the Santa Rosa Junior College Foundation as a 501(c)(3) nonprofit organization in 1969. The foundation is responsible for the administration of scholarships and infrastructural development fundraising, in large part through the Alumni & Friends Association. SRJC was closed from May 7–11, 1970 after Governor Ronald Reagan ordered that all California colleges and universities shut down due to anti-war protests and rallies after the shootings of four students at Kent State University.

In 2014, Sonoma County voters passed Measure H, a $410 million dollar bond to improve district facilities, the largest investment in the schools history.

In 2023, Dr. Angélica Garcia, the then President of Berkeley City College, was selected as the next Superindentent/President of the Sonoma County Junior College District and Santa Rosa Junior College, becoming the first woman, first Hispanic, and first LGBTQ+ person to serve in that position.

== Campus ==
=== Santa Rosa campus ===
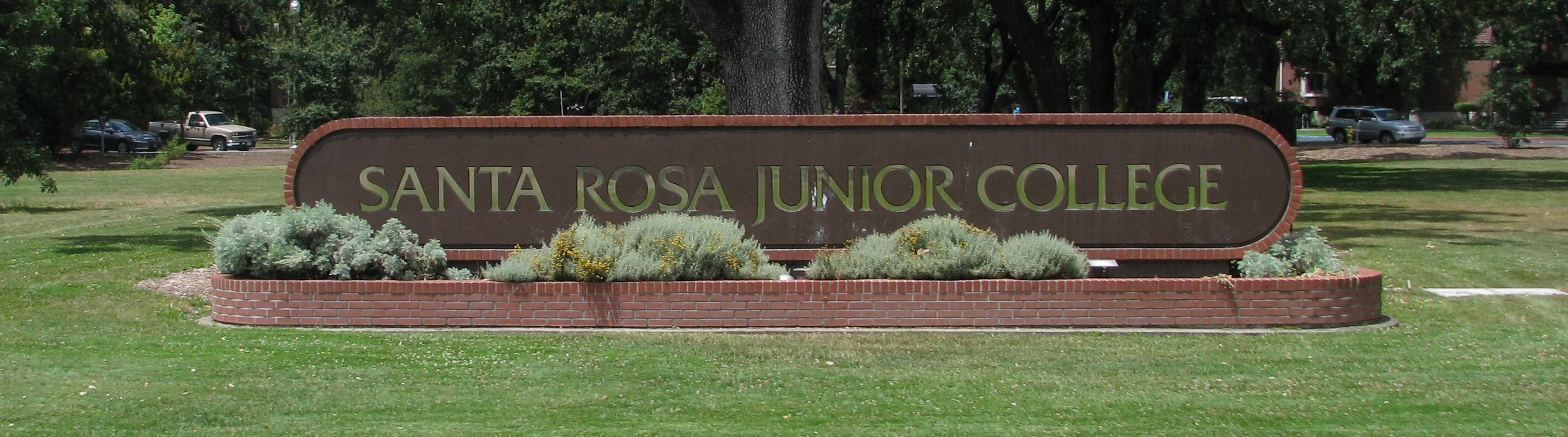
Santa Rosa Junior College Sign

SRJC's main campus is located in central Santa Rosa, 52 miles (84 km) north of San Francisco and has traditional-style ivy-covered brick buildings on 100 acres (0.40 km^{2}). In addition to its administration buildings, classroom facilities, and laboratories, the campus houses a Planetarium, the Robert F. Agrella Art Gallery, the SRJC Theatre, and the Santa Rosa Junior College Multicultural Museum.

==== Frank P. Doyle Library ====
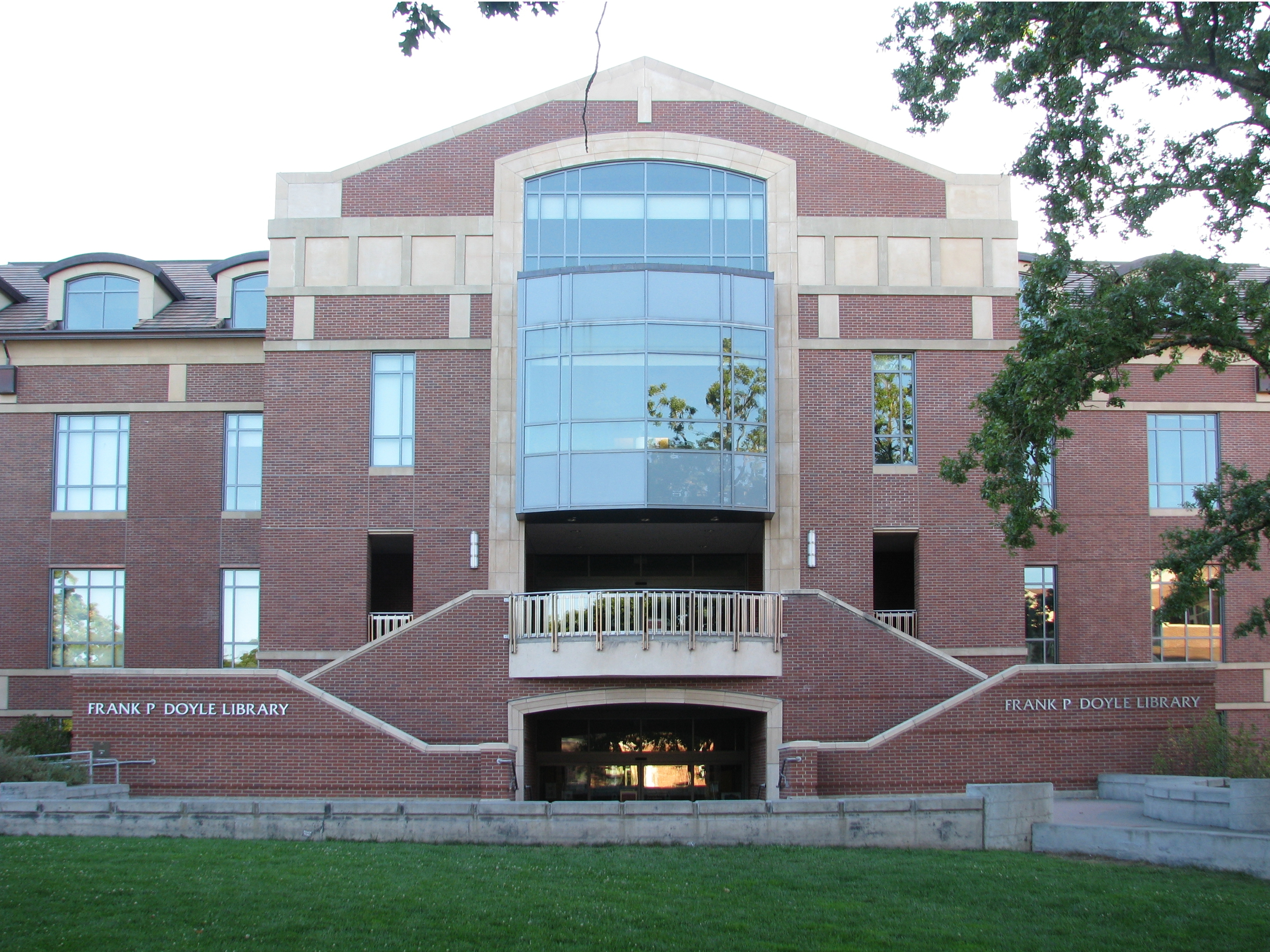
Frank P. Doyle Library

In August 2006, SRJC moved its Santa Rosa campus library to the new Frank Pierce Doyle Library building. Named after the college's most significant benefactor, the four-story building is the largest on campus at 145,000 square feet (13,500 m^{2}). It houses the Library, Media Services, Distance Education, and Instructional Computing Departments, as well as the college art gallery, tutorial center and Center for Excellence in Teaching and Learning, a multimedia training and production facility for SRJC faculty. The building was constructed with green building features designed to make it energy efficient and environmentally friendly, including an array of 77 KW photovoltaic solar panels on the library roof. Santa Rosa Junior College librarians were leaders in the early movement to promote information literacy in California's community colleges, and SRJC was among the first of the colleges to institute an information literacy requirement for graduation. The Library and Information Resources Department offers several full-credit courses to fill this requirement.

===== Robert F. Agrella Art Gallery =====
The Santa Rosa Junior College Art Gallery was established in 1973, the first significant exhibition space in the region. The original gallery location was in Bussman Hall on the Santa Rosa Campus, where an old anthropology museum previously existed. In fall 2006, the Art Gallery transitioned to a new space in the Frank P. Doyle Library. The gallery was later renamed in 2012 in honor of the recently retired president of 22 years, the Robert F. Agrella Art Gallery offering exhibits and programs which support the art curriculum, focusing on art history, ceramics, computer graphics, drawing, graphic design, jewelry, painting, photography, printmaking and sculpture. In addition to the Annual Student Show and the occasional Art Faculty exhibits, quality art from outside the area is shown throughout the year. Exhibits are open to the community.

==== Santa Rosa Junior College Multicultural Museum ====
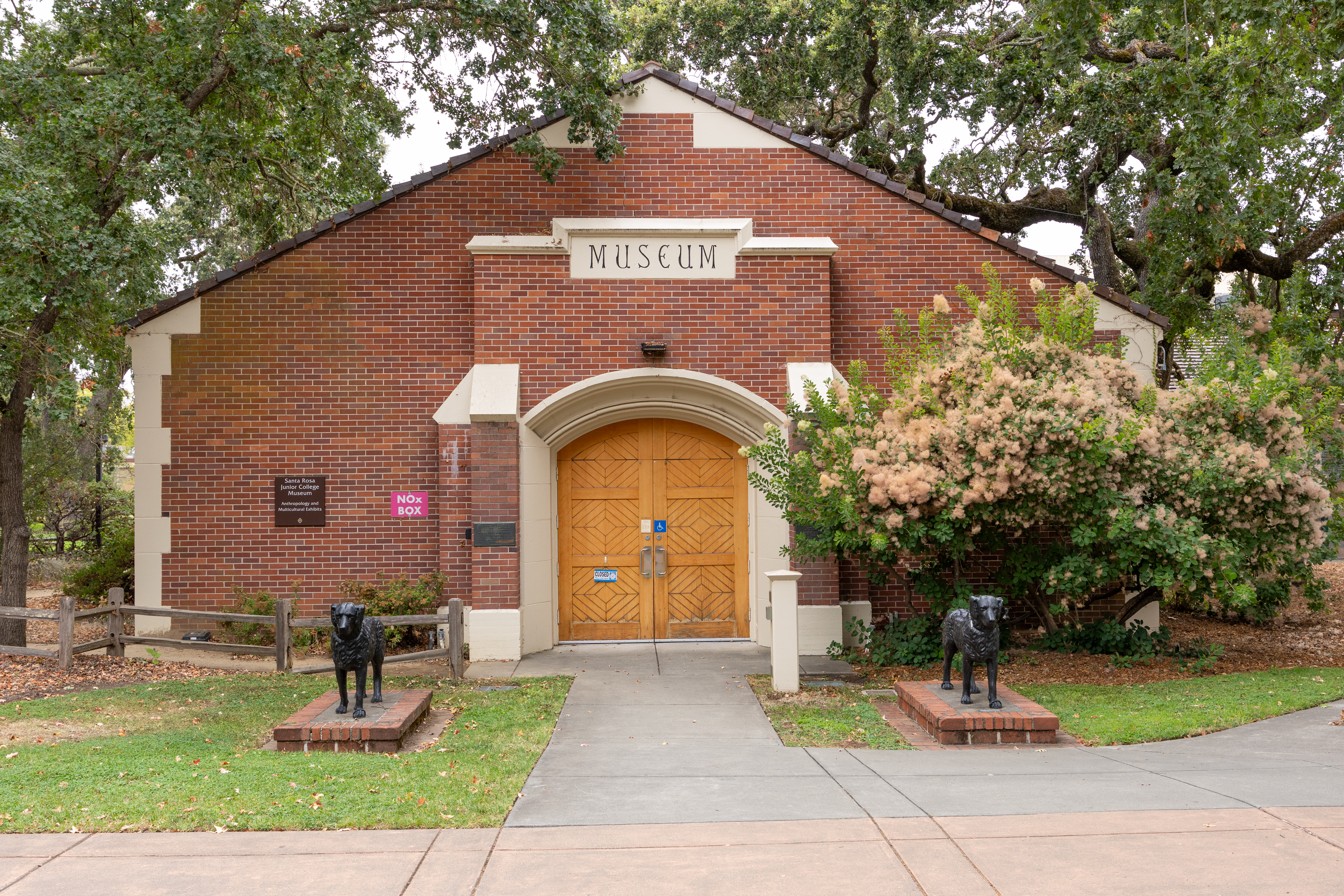
SRJC Multicultural Museum

The college's museum, originally called the Jesse Peter Museum, focuses on the Native American art of North America and ethnographic art of parts of Mesoamerica, Central America, South America, Africa, and Asia. Permanent exhibits include Native American baskets, jewelry and pottery that come from the Elsie Allen Collection, acquired in the 1970s. The permanent and changing art exhibits focus on Native American art and anthropology of other cultures, and are used as a resource for multi-cultural studies by Santa Rosa Junior College students and area students.

==== Burdo Culinary Arts Center ====
The B. Robert Burdo Center is the home of Santa Rosa Junior College's Culinary Arts Program. The two-story, 22,000 square foot building includes three classrooms, and four teaching kitchens, incorporating a public demonstration kitchen. The student-run Café and Bakery is featured on the first floor of the new building. It was completed in 2012 and put into service for the Spring 2012 semester.

=== Petaluma campus ===
SRJC began offering evening classes in Petaluma, 35 miles (56 km) north of San Francisco, in 1964, and in the early 1970s held classes in leased spaces throughout the city. In 1985, the Board of Trustees purchased a 40-acre (160,000 m^{2}) site in east Petaluma, and in 1995 the first phase of construction of a Petaluma Center was completed. The Petaluma Center officially became a campus in April 1999. The second phase of construction to expand the Petaluma Campus to a 12,000-student capacity was completed in 2008, and included: life science and physical science labs, an art studio, a new 35,000 square foot library, a physical fitness center, bookstore, student services areas, dining areas, additional classrooms and technology labs, faculty/administrative offices, a digital arts lab, a nearly 300-seat auditorium (Carole L. Ellis Auditorium), and expanded outdoor spaces. The contemporary adobe-style buildings with red tile roofs and clock tower with Westminster chimes reflect the Spanish history of the area.

==== Herold Mahoney Library ====
The Herold Mahoney Library at SRJC's Petaluma campus originally opened its doors in the Fall of 1995. Many of the programs in SRJC's Arts & Lectures Series take place in the Mahoney Library. With the expansion of the Petaluma campus, the Mahoney Library has expanded to five times its original size, 35,000 sq ft (3,300 m^{2}). The new library building opened on June 16, 2008, the first day of summer session.

==== Technology Academy ====
There is a Technology Academy located on the Petaluma Campus. Opened in January 2009 in Telecom Valley, this educational program was established to meet the training needs of North Bay technology companies, offering classes and training programs to the general public and in-service training for the technology companies. Clientele includes incumbent workers, entry-level workers, and high school co-enrollment students.

=== Shone Farm ===
Established in 1972, the Robert Shone Farm currently operates as a self-sustaining 365-acre (1.48 km^{2}) farm near the Russian River, in Forestville, generating income from the sale of grapes from the college's vineyard operation as well as oat hay, oat silage, and sheep and swine operations. A new Agriculture Pavilion was completed in 2006. The farm offers diversified, hands-on educational opportunities in Viticulture, Wine Studies, Equine Studies, Animal Science, Sustainable Agriculture, and Environmental Conservation. Produce raised in farm gardens are used in SRJC's Culinary Training Program and in a community supported agriculture program operated by students from agribusiness and sustainable agriculture programs. The Shone Farm Winery was established in fall 2008.

=== Public Safety Training Center ===
The Public Safety Training Center was established in Windsor in 1961, and currently provides coursework and field training for police officers, corrections officers, police dispatchers, seasonal park rangers, emergency medical technicians, paramedics, and firefighters. In spring 2002 the modern facility was completed on a 20-acre (0.081 km^{2}) site in Windsor to provide in-service training for people working in public safety. The center is the largest provider of in-service training for law enforcement personnel north of the Golden Gate Bridge, offering traditional academic offerings, administration and classroom buildings, an emergency medical care laboratory facility, an indoor firing range, a large multipurpose building, a scenario training village, and a driving instruction area with skid pad.

== Athletics ==
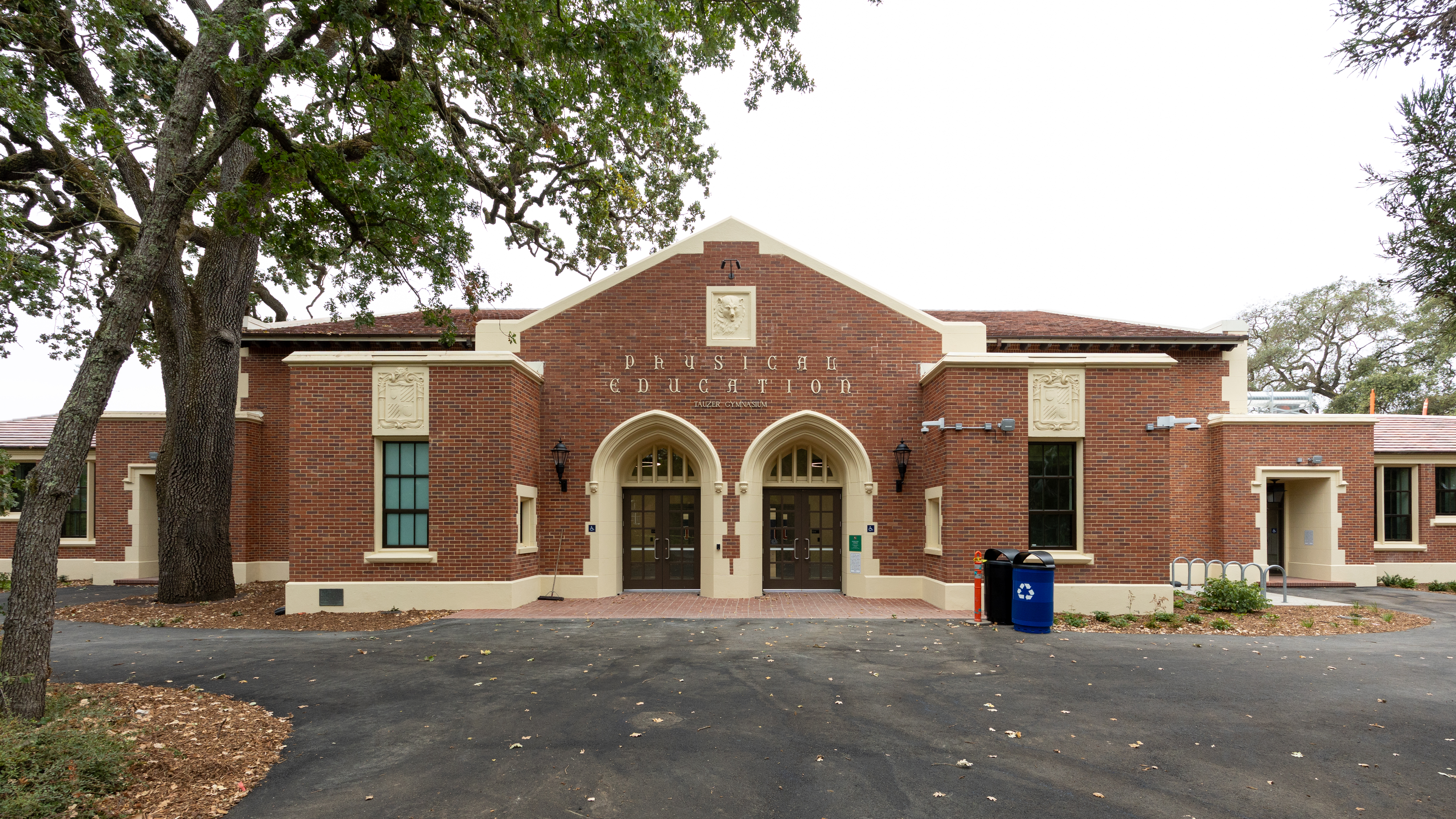
Tauzer Gymnasium

Santa Rosa Junior College is home to the Bear Cubs. They are part of the Big 8 Athletic Conference and are well known for their football, baseball, soccer and wrestling programs. They have a long-time rivalry with the Sacramento City College Panthers.

Ice hockey, where the SRJC team are the Polar Bears, is a club sport, but the team was nationally ranked in 2009–10 and 2011–12. There are athletic organizations including judo, rugby, cheerleading, and beach volleyball.

=== Baseball ===
The baseball team won the state championship in 2016, placing second to Grossmont College in a seven-game championship series in 2017.

== Speech and debate ==
SRJC Forensics, the speech and debate team, earned the #1 national ranking among two-year colleges in 2016. Led by Mark Nelson and Hal Sanford, for five years the team ranked for five years within the top six teams in the nation.

== Student newspaper ==
The SRJC student newspaper, The Oak Leaf, has won awards for community college newspapers and been honored by the California Newspaper Publishers Association and the Society of Professional Journalists for its coverage of the many wildfires that have affected Santa Rosa and nearby settlements since the mid-2010s.

== Notable alumni ==
- Jacob Appelbaum, journalist, computer security researcher, hacker
- Donna Boutelle, historian
- Sheana Davis, chef and cheesemaker
- Gary Friedman, co-CEO and chairman of Restoration Hardware
- Adam Froman, American football player
- Jonny Gomes, professional baseball player
- Tyson Griffin, wrestler, Mixed Martial Artist
- Herbert N. Hultgren, Professor of Medicine (Cardiovascular) Emeritus, Stanford Medical School, high-altitude medicine pioneer and researcher
- Michael Kearney, former child prodigy
- Gaye LeBaron, newspaper columnist, author, local historian
- Mike McGuire, 52nd President pro Tempore of the California State Senate
- Ben McKee, bassist for Imagine Dragons
- Brandon Poulson, professional baseball player
- Brande Roderick, model and actress
- Jake Scheiner, baseball player for the Hiroshima Toyo Carp of Nippon Professional Baseball
- Gabbi Tuft, trans woman who was formerly a professional wrestler under the ring name Tyler Reks
- Jason Verrett, National Football League cornerback

== Notable faculty ==
- Molly Murphy MacGregor, educator and co-founder of the National Women's History Alliance
- Edward Von der Porten, early nautical archaeologist
