= List of traffic accidents by death toll in the United States =

This list of traffic accidents by death toll in the United States includes any fatal motor vehicle crashes that occurred on public roadways involving passenger cars, commercial trucks, or buses, as well as collisions between road vehicles and trains. Excluded from this list are the following:

1. Incidents involving only trains or airplanes without a road vehicle
2. Intentional vehicle-rammings or acts of terrorism
3. Vehicular homicides

== List ==
Date	Location	Dead	Injured	Passengers	Vehicles	Description	Notes
March 14, 1940	Alamo, Texas	34	8	43	Missouri Pacific freight train, 1930s-model farm transport truck	At around 8:05 a.m., a westbound Missouri Pacific freight train collided with a heavy farm transport truck at a railroad grade crossing at North Tower Road in Alamo, Texas. The late-1930s model truck, driven by agricultural crew leader Jose Ramon, was carrying approximately 42 farmworkers, the majority of whom were crowded into the vehicle's tarpaulin-covered flatbed. The train struck the truck as it traversed the crossing, resulting in 34 fatalities.	Deadliest automobile accident in U.S. history.
September 17, 1963	Thomas Ranch Road, Chualar, California	32	25	58	ALCO RS-11 freight train, Bus (illegally converted flatbed truck)	Chualar train-bus collision: Between 4:20 - 4:25 p.m., a modified flatbed truck carrying 58 migrant farmworkers was struck by a freight train at a railroad crossing, killing 32 passengers and injuring 25 others. Nobody was injured on the train, and the only uninjured passenger from the crash was the driver, Francisco "Pancho" Espinosa, the workers' foreman.	
May 21, 1976	Interstate 680, Martinez, California	29	24	53	1950 Crown Coach Corporation school bus	Yuba City bus disaster: a bus carrying the Yuba City High School choir crashed in Martinez, California. While traveling on the off-ramp from I-680 to Marina Vista Avenue, the vehicle struck and broke through a guardrail, falling 35 feet onto the road below. The accident resulted in 29 fatalities.	One additional victim, 15-year-old Daniel I. Wright, died 3 days later at the Highland Hospital in Oakland, California.
August 4, 1952	U.S. Route 81, Lorena, Texas	28	25	54	Two Greyhound buses	At approximately 3:50 a.m. on August 4, 1952, two Greyhound buses traveling on U.S. Highway 81 collided head-on near Lorena, Texas, resulting in a massive fire that killed 26 passengers and both drivers, and left 25 others injured.	
May 14, 1988	Interstate 71, Carroll County, Carrollton, Kentucky	27	37	67	1977 Ford B-700,1987 Toyota Hilux, 1977 Cadillac de Ville	Carrollton bus collision: A head-on collision between a bus carrying a church youth group and a pickup truck occurred at approximately 10:55 p.m.. The accident caused a fire on the bus, killing 27 passengers. The driver of the pickup truck, 34-year-old Larry Wayne Mahoney, was intoxicated and had been driving in the wrong lane at high speeds. 6 escaped uninjured	
May 18, 1963	Belle Glade, Florida	27	15	42	1946 conventional-style school bus, pickup truck	At around 6:00 a.m., a sideswipe collision between a converted bus carrying 42 migrant agricultural workers and a pickup truck occurred near Belle Glade, Florida. The collision caused the bus to leave the roadway, overturn, and submerge in a drainage canal, resulting in 27 deaths by drowning. Fifteen occupants survived the crash, sustaining minor injuries.	
February 28, 1958	U.S. Route 23, Prestonburg, Kentucky	27	?	49	Floyd County school bus No. 27	Prestonsburg, Kentucky, bus crash: At around 8:10 a.m., a Floyd County school bus struck the rear of a tow truck along US Route 23, causing the bus to plunge into the icy waters of the Big Sandy River, where it was swept downstream and submerged. 22 children escaped while 26 others and the driver were killed.	
December 1, 1938	South Jordan, Utah	24	16	41	School bus, Denver and Rio Grande Western freight train	1938 South Jordan train-bus collision: At around 8:43 a.m., a Denver and Rio Grande Western freight train collided with a Jordan High School bus at an unguarded crossing in South Jordan, Utah. Poor visibility from heavy winter fog and snow caused the driver to pull onto the tracks directly in the path of the oncoming train. The crash resulted in 24 fatalities, including 23 of the 40 students on board and the driver.	
September 23, 2005	Interstate 45, Wilmer, Texas	23	21	44	1998 Motor Coach Industries motorcoach	At around 6:00 a.m., a Motorcoach carrying 44 residents and staff of a nursing home in Bellaire, Texas was evacuating ahead of Hurricane Rita en route to Dallas when a fire broke out in the right-rear tire hub, killing 23 people and injuring 21 others. 2 of the injured suffered serious injuries while 19 only received minor injuries.	
May 9, 1999	Interstate 610, New Orleans, Louisiana	22	22	44	1997 MCI 102-DL3 motorcoach	Mother's Day bus crash: At around 9:00 a.m., a motorcoach veered off of I-610 and crashed into a dirt embankment, killing 22 passengers and wounding 22 others, including the driver.	
September 21, 1989	Farm to Market Road 676, Alton, Texas	21	49	82	School bus, delivery truck	Alton, Texas bus crash: At around 7:34 a.m., a Pepsi-Cola delivery truck collided with a school bus near Alton, Texas. The impact caused the bus to plunge into a water-filled gravel pit, where it eventually sank. The accident resulted in 21 fatalities and 49 injuries.	
May 30, 1986	U.S. Route 395, West Walker River, Walker, California	21	19	41	Charter bus	At approximately 10:10 a.m., a charter bus carrying 41 passengers went out of control on U.S. Route 395, near Walker, California. While navigating an S-curve, the bus swerved repeatedly before striking a rock fence, overturning, and coming to rest in the West Walker River. The accident resulted in 21 fatalities and 19 injuries.	
June 6, 1957	U.S. Route 301, Eastover, North Carolina	21	15	41	Flatbed truck, tractor-trailer truck	At around 6:55 a.m., a flatbed truck carrying 41 migrant farmworkers collided with a tractor-trailer in Eastover, North Carolina. The impact ignited a fire that consumed both vehicles, resulting in 21 fatalities and 15 injuries.	
March 25, 1937	U.S. Route 50, Salem, Illinois	21	2	23	Charter bus	At around 12:49 a.m., a charter bus carrying 23 members of the Transcontinental Roller Derby troupe crashed outside of Salem, Illinois, on U.S. Route 50. While traveling from St. Louis to Cincinnati, a front tire blowout caused the driver to lose control; the bus skidded into a concrete bridge abutment and immediately burst into flames. The accident resulted in 21 fatalities, with only two passengers surviving the fire.	
December 14, 1961	Greeley, Colorado	20	17	37	School bus, Union Pacific City of Denver passenger train	Greeley bus disaster: At around 7:59 a.m., a school bus carrying 36 students was struck by a Union Pacific passenger train at a rural crossing near Greeley, Colorado. The train, traveling at roughly 80 mph, impacted the rear of the bus, splitting the vehicle in two. The accident resulted in 20 fatalities among the students, with 17 survivors (including the driver).	
June 5, 1980	State Route 7, Jasper, Arkansas	20	13	33	Charter bus	At approximately 12:47 a.m., a charter bus carrying 33 occupants lost control while descending a steep, winding grade on State Route 7. The vehicle failed to negotiate a curve, ran off the road into a drainage channel, and vaulted down a steep embankment after striking a concrete culvert. The accident resulted in 20 fatalities, including the driver, and 13 injuries.	
March 7, 1968	Interstate 15, Baker, California	20	11	31 (30 in the bus, 1 in the sedan)	1964 Chevrolet Impala, Greyhound bus	At approximately 3:50 p.m., a 1964 Chevrolet Impala was traveling the wrong way in the eastbound lanes of Interstate 15 when it collided head-on with an interstate bus. An Investigation by the NTSB revealed the driver of the sedan was under the influence of alcohol and carbon monoxide at the time of the crash. Both vehicles were traveling at normal freeway cruising speeds when the collision occurred.	
October 6, 2018	NY State Route 30 and 30A, Schoharie, New York	20 (18 in vehicle, 2 bystanders)	0	18	2001 Ford Excursion limousine	Schoharie limousine crash: Around 1:55 p.m., a break failure caused a Limousine to lose control, striking 2 bystanders and killing 17 passengers along with the driver at the junction between Route 30 and 30A.	
January 15, 1974	Blythe, California	19	28	47	1955 GMC bus	1974 Blythe, California bus crash: At approximately 12:55 a.m., a bus carrying a group of migrant farmworkers suffered a catastrophic failure of its left front tire while traveling on Interstate 10 near Blythe, California. The driver lost control, causing the bus to careen off the highway, strike an embankment, and overturn. The accident resulted in 19 fatalities and 28 injuries.	
December 26, 1972	Fort Sumner, New Mexico	19	15	35 (34 in the bus, 1 in the cattle truck)	Bus, cattle truck	At approximately 6:45 p.m., a school bus type vehicle carrying a youth group from a Texas church was traveling west on U.S. Routes 60 84 near Fort Sumner, New Mexico. While attempting to pass an oncoming cattle truck carrying a load of cattle on a narrow bridge, the truck driver misjudged his position, struck the bridge rail, and jackknifed into the path of the bus. The trailer impacted the bus, crushing the forward section and tearing through the first several rows of seats. The collision resulted in 19 fatalities, including the bus driver, and injured the remaining 15 passengers on the bus.	
November 29, 1991	Interstate 5, Coalinga, California	17	150	?	104 vehicles (93 cars, 11 semi-trailer trucks)	1991 Interstate 5 dust storm: At approximately 1:30 p.m., a massive chain-reaction collision involving 104 vehicles occurred on Interstate 5 near Coalinga, California. The accident was triggered by an intense dust storm that reduced visibility to near zero, causing a sequence of pileups across both sides of the highway. The disaster resulted in 17 fatalities and over 150 injuries.	
August 8, 2008	U.S. Highway 75, Sherman, Texas	17	39	56	2002 MCI motorcoach	Sherman, Texas bus accident: At approximately 12:45 a.m., a motorcoach carrying 55 passengers departed the roadway on U.S. Highway 75 and struck a bridge railing. The bus broke through the railing and fell from the overpass, landing on its side on the embankment below. The accident resulted in 17 fatalities and 39 injuries.	
March 12, 2011	Interstate 95, Bronx, New York City	15	18	33	1999 Prevost motorcoach	At about 5:38 a.m., a motorcoach traveling from a Connecticut casino to Chinatown, Manhattan, struck a highway signpost on Interstate 95 in the Bronx, New York, causing the roof of the bus to be sheared off. The disaster resulted in 15 fatalities and 18 injuries.	
October 9, 2004	Interstate 55, Turrell, Arkansas	15	15	30	1988 MCI motorcoach	At approximately 5:02 a.m., a motorcoach carrying 29 passengers veered off Interstate 55 near Turrell, Arkansas, and entered a drainage ditch. The bus rolled over, causing the roof, which had been poorly repaired following a previous fire, to separate from the body. The structural failure of the roof led to the ejection of all 30 occupants, resulting in 15 fatalities and 15 injuries.	
May 13, 1972	U.S. Route 11W, Grainger County, Tennessee	14	15	27 (26 in bus, 1 in tractor-trailer)	Greyhound bus, tractor trailer	1972 Bean Station bus-truck collision: At around 5:35 a.m., a Greyhound bus drifted into the wrong lane along US Route 11W, striking a tractor-trailer head-on, killing both drivers in addition to 12 passengers.	
October 23, 2016	Interstate 10, Palm Springs, California	13	31	43	1996 motorcoach, 2015 International ProStar Truck tractor	2016 I-10 tour bus crash: At approximately 5:17 a.m., a tour bus returning to Los Angeles from a casino in Thermal, California, collided with the rear of a stationary semi-trailer truck on Interstate 10 in Palm Springs. The impact caused the trailer to penetrate roughly 15 feet into the bus, resulting in 13 fatalities, including the bus driver, and 30 injuries.	
December 11, 1990	Interstate 75, Calhoun, Tennessee	12	42	?	99 vehicles	1990 Interstate 75 fog pileup: At approximately 9:10 a.m., a series of chain-reaction collisions involving 99 vehicles occurred on Interstate 75 near Calhoun, Tennessee, due to a sudden and dense patch of fog. The disaster resulted in 12 fatalities and 42 injuries, making it one of the largest and most significant multi-vehicle pileups in U.S. history.	
March 15, 1999	Bourbonnais, Illinois	11	122	229 (207 passengers and 21 crew members on the train, one in the semi-trailer truck)	Semi-trailer truck, City of New Orleans passenger train	1999 Bourbonnais, Illinois, train crash: At approximately 9:47 p.m., Amtrak's City of New Orleans passenger train collided with a flatbed tractor-trailer carrying steel at a public grade crossing in Bourbonnais, Illinois. The impact derailed the locomotive and several passenger cars, which then struck a line of parked rail cars. The accident resulted in 11 fatalities and 122 injuries.	
November 20, 1955	U.S. Route 20,Dixon, Nebraska	10	0	10	Two automobiles	A head-on collision occurred on Highway 20 when a vehicle experienced an apparent front-tire blowout, causing it to strike another car carrying members of an orchestra. The second vehicle burst into flames upon impact, and there were no survivors among the six teenagers and four musicians involved in the accident.	
March 14, 2025	Interstate 70, Edson, Kansas	8	46	?	71 vehicles	Between 3:20 and 3:35 p.m., a massive chain-reaction collision involving 71 vehicles occurred on Interstate 70 near Edson, Kansas. The accident was triggered by a sudden and powerful dust storm that reduced visibility to near zero, causing a sequence of pileups across the highway. The disaster resulted in 8 fatalities and 46 injuries.	
