= Carrollton bus collision =

1988 fatal traffic collision

Details
- Date: May 14, 1988; 10:55 p.m. (EDT)
- Location: Interstate 71; 5 mi (8.0 km) S from Carrollton, Kentucky
- Coordinates: 38.605241°N 85.170261°W
- Country: United States
- Incident type: Head-on collision resulting in catastrophic fire of bus
- Cause: Pickup truck driver driving under the influence in wrong direction; Egress difficulties impairing bus evacuation (secondary)

Statistics
- Vehicles: 1977 Ford B-700; 1987 Toyota Hilux; 1977 Cadillac de Ville
- Passengers: 67
- Deaths: 27
- Injured: 34

The Carrollton bus collision occurred on May 14, 1988, on Interstate 71 in unincorporated Carroll County, Kentucky, United States. The collision involved a former school bus in use by a church youth group and a pickup truck driven by an alcohol-impaired driver. The head-on collision was the deadliest incident involving drunk driving and the third-deadliest bus crash in U.S. history.

Of the 67 people on the bus (counting the driver), there were 27 fatalities in the crash, the same number as the 1958 Prestonsburg bus disaster, and behind the 1976 Yuba City bus disaster (29), and the 1963 Chualar bus crash (32), according to the National Safety Council. Additionally, but not indicated in some records, the March 14, 1940 Alamo, Texas train-bus collision was more deadly with 34 fatalities.

In the aftermath of the disaster, several family members of victims became active leaders of Mothers Against Drunk Driving, and one—Karolyn Nunnallee—became national president of the organization. The standards for both operation and equipment for school buses and similar buses were improved in Kentucky and many other states. These include an increased number of emergency exits, higher standards for structural integrity, and the use of less volatile diesel fuel. On Interstate 71, the crash site is marked with a highway sign erected by the Kentucky Transportation Cabinet. Memorial items such as crosses and flower arrangements are regularly placed at the site by families and friends.

== Background ==
On May 14, 1988, a youth group mostly consisting of teenagers who attended North Hardin High School, James T. Alton Middle School, and Radcliff Middle School, and four adults from the Assembly of God church in Radcliff, Kentucky, boarded their church bus and headed to Kings Island theme park in Mason, Ohio, about 170 miles (270 km) from Radcliff. The group included church members and their guests. As everyone arrived early that Saturday morning, the number of those wanting to go on the trip had grown to more than originally anticipated. The church's principal pastor, who did not join the journey, restricted the ridership to the legal limit of 66 persons plus the driver.

=== Bus ===
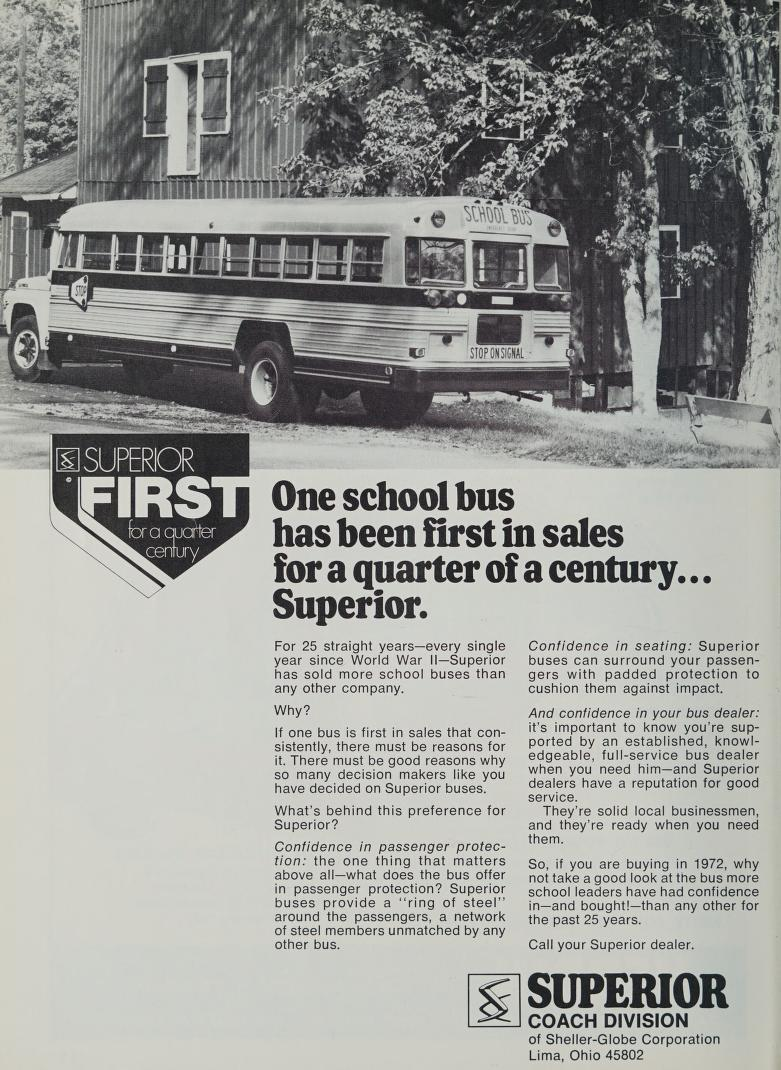
1972 advertisement for the Superior Coach Company, showing a similar bus to the one involved in the crash

The bus involved in the crash was a former school bus, configured with a bus body mated to a medium-duty truck chassis and frame. The 1977 model-year Ford B700 chassis was mated to a Superior school bus body. The vehicle was designed with a capacity of 66 passengers and a driver, including 11 rows of 39-inch wide seats, separated by a 12-inch central aisle.

Ford Motor Company manufactured the B700 chassis at its Kentucky Truck Plant in Louisville, Kentucky; it was then shipped to Superior Coach Company of Lima, Ohio. A company owned by industrial conglomerate Sheller-Globe Corporation, Superior manufactured the school bus body that was installed on the Ford B700 chassis. The vehicle was certified as a "school bus" with an effective build date of March 23, 1977, the date associated with the construction of the Ford chassis (as required by federal regulations).

Both the vehicle type and the build date would later serve as important legal distinctions. The bus was manufactured on March 23, 1977, just nine days before four major federal safety standards were to take effect for school bus production. In addition to upgraded rollover protection, school buses produced on or after April 1, 1977, were required to be designed with improved structural integrity in body joints, better seating protection in crashes, and improved fuel system protection (to reduce spills and fires).

The completed bus was delivered in time for use during the 1977–78 school year and served ten years in use as a school bus. Radcliff Assembly of God acquired the used school bus as surplus from the Meade County school district, and the church had owned it for about one year as a church bus. In July 1987, the church successfully made the same round trip with the bus to Kings Island. Along with short local moves on school days, the church also drove the bus successfully on several other long trips. It was maintained regularly by mechanically inclined church members, including a civilian motor pool supervisor from nearby Fort Knox. A week before the 1988 Kings Island trip, the bus received two new tires of good commercial quality; the front-end suspension and steering components were also examined at that time. The 11-year-old vehicle was considered to be in good mechanical condition on May 14, 1988.

=== Trip ===
On the trip, the bus was driven by John Pearman, a part-time associate pastor of the church who was a local court clerk. The group left the church early that morning and traveled uneventfully to the park. They spent the whole day and early evening at Kings Island, then boarded the bus and began traveling out of Ohio and back into Northern Kentucky toward Radcliff. After about an hour, they stopped to fill the 60-gallon (227-litre) fuel tank with gasoline, then resumed the trip southward.

== Collision ==
At 10:55 p.m., while heading south on Interstate 71 outside of Carrollton, Kentucky, the bus collided almost head-on with a black 1987 Toyota pickup truck which was traveling at high speed the wrong way (north in the southbound lanes) on a curved stretch of the highway. The small truck was driven by Larry Wayne Mahoney, a 34-year-old factory worker who was intoxicated. Mahoney later admitted he had been drinking in a bar and at a friend's house prior to the collision. Police also found a twelve-pack of Miller Lite beer in Mahoney's truck which was still cold and had several cans missing.

During the collision, the left rear of the pickup truck spun 90 degrees to the right and, while doing so, struck the left side of a 1977 Cadillac Sedan de Ville heading in the same direction as the bus, causing damage to the back driver's door and vinyl roof. The car had broken glass along with red plastic material that was from the taillight lens of the Toyota. The right front of the pickup truck struck the right front of the bus, breaking off the bus's suspension and driving the leaf spring backward into the gas tank mounted behind an exterior panel but outside the heavier frame, just behind the step well for the front door. The front door was jammed shut by collision damage.

Both vehicle drivers sustained injuries, but nobody aboard the bus was seriously injured by the actual collision between the two vehicles. However, the right front suspension of the Ford chassis broke off through the bus stepwell, puncturing the gasoline tank and igniting the fuel supply. When fire first broke out immediately after the collision, bus driver John Pearman tried to put it out with a small fire extinguisher while passengers began to evacuate through the center rear emergency door, squeezing through the narrow opening between the two rear seats and jumping to the ground.

A survivor recounted the short timeframe of events: "We knew we hit something, and…all the kids got up in the aisle thinking we were gonna get off. And within 20 seconds you felt the heat come in the bus. You started hearing kids crying and screaming for their mom, panicking. That's when everybody started pushing on everybody to go one way." Another remembered startling awake after the collision and attempting to escape through a window but it refused to open, before rushing to the back.

Survivors said after emptying the small fire extinguisher, Pearman helped some of the many children find their way down the narrow and dark aisle to the only practical way out of the smoke-filled bus. According to the NTSB investigation, more than 60 people trying to reach the rear emergency door—the only available exit—created a crush of bodies in the 12-inch-wide aisle. Many passengers found themselves unable to move. A beverage cooler which had been earlier placed in the aisle near row 10 (of 11 rows of seats) aggravated the crush.

Other passengers tried unsuccessfully to break or kick out any of the split-sash side windows. Only one adult, a woman who was of small stature, managed to escape through a nine-inch (23 cm) opening in a side window. When she looked back up from the ground, the window opening was filled with flames. The other three adults aboard died, including Pearman. A passersby and some of the escaped passengers helped to extract immobilized children through the rear door, and help them to ground level about 3 ft (0.91 m) below. A survivor recounted how when he reached the back door; "Someone on the outside grabbed my arm, put their foot on the bumper and literally pulled me out. I hit the asphalt and started running... I could hear the screams and the explosions."

Within four minutes, the entire bus was on fire, and soon the exodus of passengers stopped. At that point, the passersby who had stopped to help could not reach those still aboard due to the raging fire, and turned their efforts to tending to the crowd of 40 mostly injured survivors. Soon the entire interior of the bus flashed over, ultimately burning the trapped 27 people remaining aboard.

After first responders treated and transported survivors and extinguished the fire, a crane was used to load the bus onto a flatbed truck that transported the bus and those persons killed to the National Guard Armory in Carrollton. There, the Kentucky State Police and the Carroll County coroner went through the interior of the bus seat by seat to find and remove bodies, most of which were burned beyond recognition.

== Victims ==
In total, 26 passengers and the bus driver died, 34 passengers were injured, and six passengers escaped the bus without serious injury. Larry Mahoney, the driver of the Toyota pickup, sustained injuries from the collision. The deceased children ranged in age from 10 to 15 years old, with a majority aged between 13 and 14 years old. Richard Keith Gohn, 19, was the youngest adult killed.

Many bodies were found facing the only exit, the rear door. The coroner later determined that none of the bus occupants suffered broken bones or mortal injuries from the crash impact; all had died from the fire and smoke.

Among the bus survivors, one person's leg from just below the knee had to be amputated, and about ten others suffered disfiguring burns. Only 6 bus passengers were uninjured and virtually all suffered varying degrees of emotional trauma and survivor guilt syndrome.

At least sixteen of the victims were students at Radcliff Middle School. 3 were students at North Hardin High School.

== Investigation ==
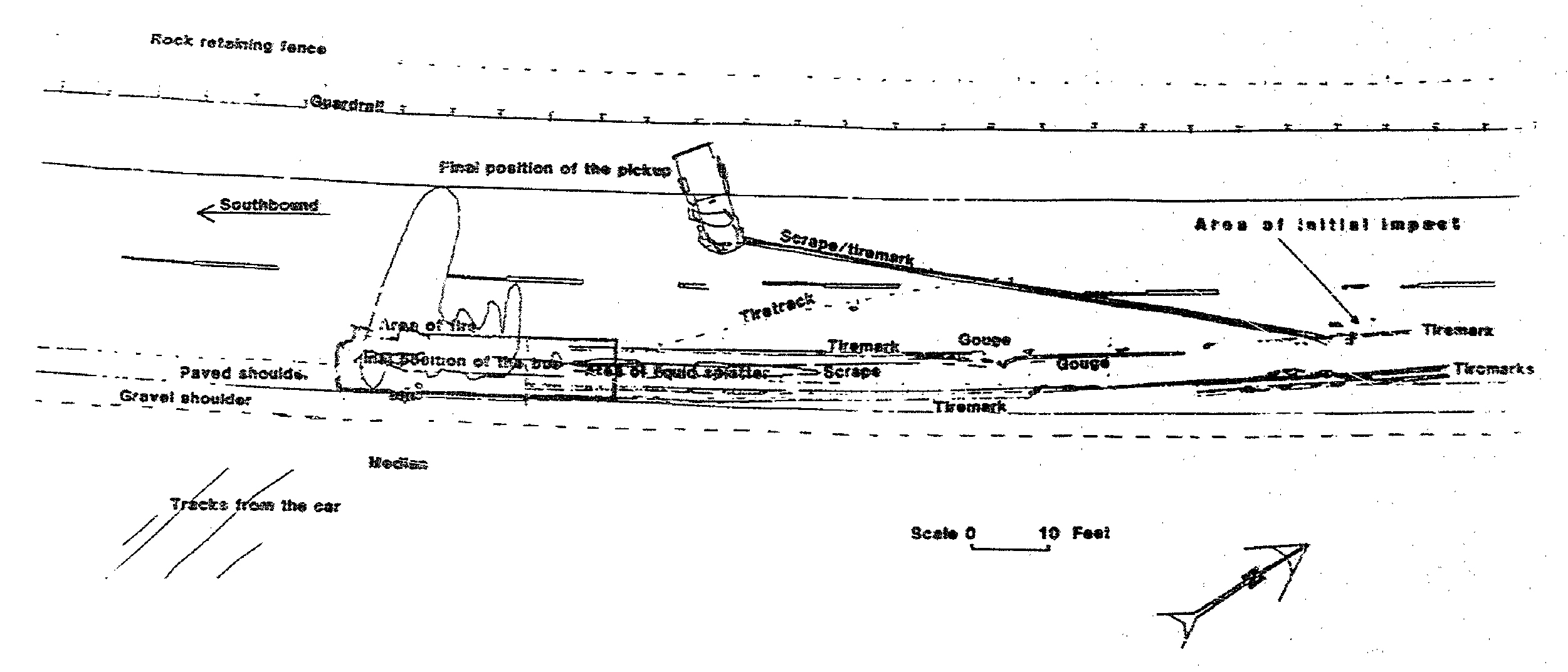
Diagram of the crash scene from the NTSB report

The National Transportation Safety Board responded, conducted an investigation and issued a report on March 28, 1989.

About 10:55 p.m. EDT on May 14, 1988, a pickup truck traveling northbound in the southbound lanes of Interstate 71 struck head-on a church activity bus traveling southbound in the left lane of the highway near Carrollton, Kentucky. As the pickup truck rotated during impact, it struck a passenger car traveling southbound in the right lane near the church bus. The church bus fuel tank was punctured during the collision sequence, and a fire ensued, engulfing the entire bus. The bus driver and 26 bus passengers were fatally injured. Thirty-four bus passengers sustained minor to critical injuries, and six bus passengers were not injured. The pickup truck driver sustained serious injuries, but neither occupant of the passenger car was injured.

The NTSB determined that "the probable cause of the collision between the pickup truck and the church activity bus was the alcohol-impaired condition of the pickup truck driver who operated his vehicle opposite to the direction of traffic flow on an interstate highway." The agency also found that the design of the 11-year-old bus also contributed to the fatalities. The bus's fuel tank was unprotected, seat covers were made of flammable material, and the rear exit was partially blocked by a row of seats. Following the NTSB report, and much sooner in many instances, many federal, state, and local agencies and bus manufacturers changed regulations, vehicle features, and operating practices.

The board recommended the phaseout of buses not meeting the federal standards established in 1977. The standards required all new school buses to have stronger fuel tanks, stronger seats and more accessible emergency exits. At the time the report was issued, about 22% of school buses in use nationwide were built before the standards were in place. The board also recommended stricter punishments for drunk driving.

== Legal ==
There was considerable civil litigation. Ford Motor Company, Sheller-Globe Corporation, and others eventually contributed to settlements with all victims and/or their families.

=== Truck driver ===
Mahoney had been previously arrested for driving under the influence in 1984, for which he was fined US$300 and his driver's license was suspended for six months. His blood alcohol concentration (BAC) two hours after the crash was .24 percent—substantially higher than the 1988 Kentucky legal limit of .10. Mahoney had no memory of the crash and learned of the collision after waking in the hospital the next day.

Mahoney was indicted by a Carroll County grand jury July 23, 1988, on 27 counts of murder. He pleaded not guilty, and bail was set at $270,000, $10,000 for each death in the crash. The Carroll County Commonwealth's Attorney initially planned to seek indictments for capital murder which would have made Mahoney eligible for a possible sentence of death by electrocution if convicted. Ultimately, however, it was decided not to file those charges. Mahoney posted bail and was released from jail in October 1988. On December 21, 1989, Mahoney was found guilty of all charges. He was sentenced to imprisonment for 16 years after a jury of the Carroll Circuit Court, under Indictment No. 88-CR-27, convicted him of 27 counts of manslaughter in the second degree, 16 counts of assault in the second degree, and 27 counts of wanton endangerment in the first degree. At trial, he was represented by the Cleveland, Ohio, criminal defense lawyer, William L. Summers. On appeal, in Case No. 1988-CA-1635, Judge Anthony M. Wilhoit of the Kentucky Court of Appeals reversed Mahoney's conviction for drunk driving on the grounds that it constituted double jeopardy under the Kentucky Constitution, ruling that the 27 counts of manslaughter in the second degree subsumed the drunk-driving conviction. The court ruled that, under Kentucky law, the elements of drunk driving were substantially similar to those of manslaughter. This meant that Mahoney's driver's license could be reinstated, even during his imprisonment. The Kentucky Supreme Court subsequently reversed this line of reasoning in another case, Justice v. Commonwealth, 987 S.W.2d 306 (Ky. December 17, 1998). On May 6, 1992, the Kentucky Supreme Court denied review of Mahoney's appeal in Case No. 1992-SC-98.

At the Kentucky State Reformatory, Mahoney worked in the medium-security facility as a clerk. He earned his GED high school equivalency diploma and attended Alcoholics Anonymous meetings. Described by authorities as a model prisoner, Mahoney reduced his incarceration by six years with good behavior, known under Kentucky law as "good time" credit. He declined the Kentucky Parole Board's parole recommendation and served out his sentence, before leaving the prison in La Grange, on September 1, 1999, having served nine and a half years. Local television stations broadcast video of him walking out of the prison.

That week, according to a published account in The Courier-Journal (Louisville), some survivors of the crash and families of the victims had said that they were willing to forgive Mahoney although the disaster marked forever the congregation of the First Assembly of God, which had many members on the bus. "I feel a little bit sorry for him", Katrina Henderson, then 23, told The Courier-Journal in 1998. "He didn't wake up one day and say 'I'm going to kill 27 people.' That's not to take any blame away from him. I think that he is a person who made some very bad choices and he paid for those choices", said Henderson, who was age 12 when she survived the wreck. The victims were members of a church, and many felt called by their religious beliefs to forgive him.

During his trial, the idea was discussed that Mahoney could save lives by talking to school groups, but Mahoney has so far declined.

According to a story by The Cincinnati Enquirer in 2003, Mahoney was living in quiet, self-imposed obscurity in rural Owen County, Kentucky, about ten miles (16 km) from the crash site.

== Aftermath ==
=== Changes in Kentucky ===
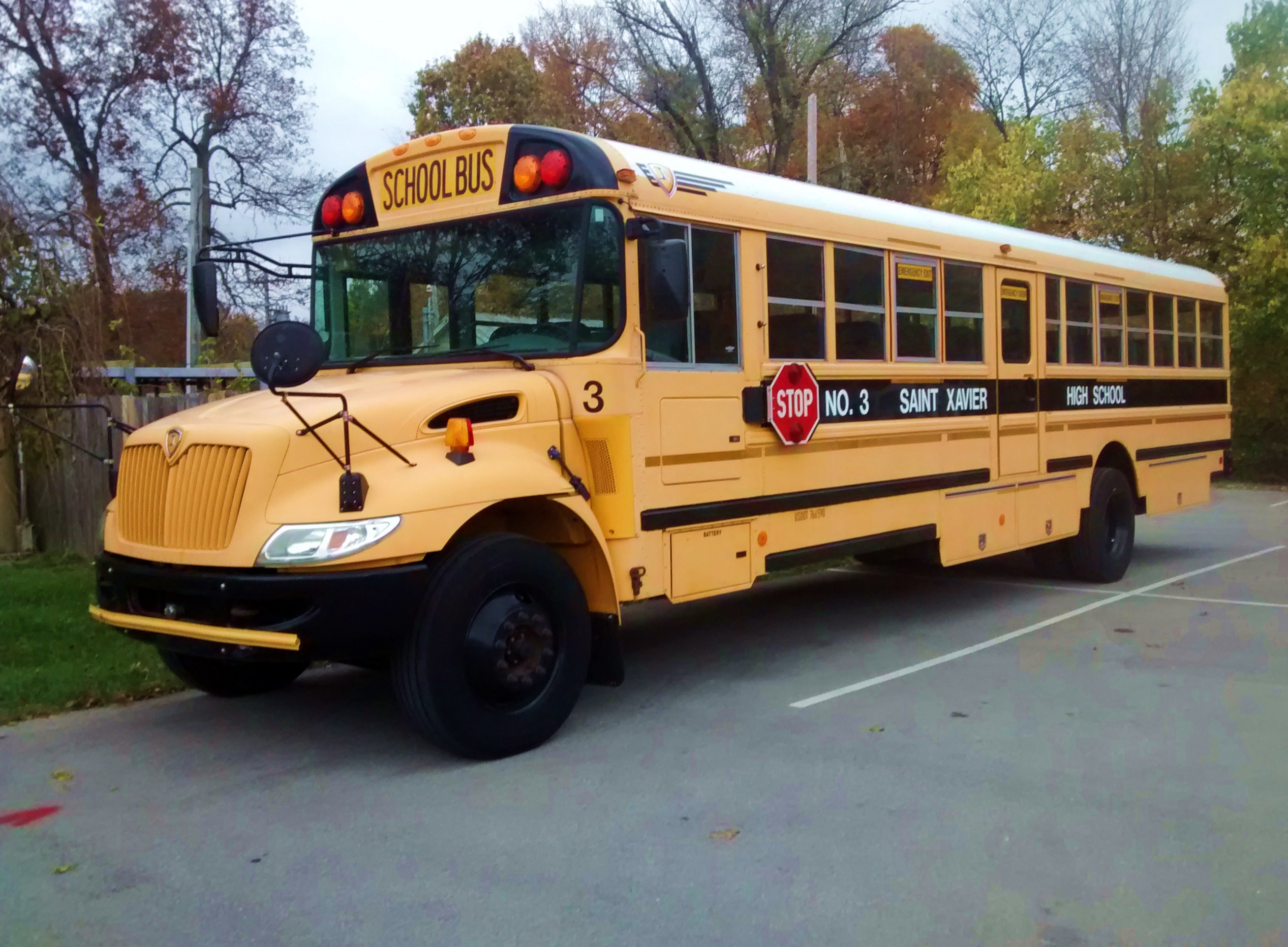
A school bus operated by St. Xavier High School in Louisville in 2016. The bus is equipped with emergency exit windows and a left-side exit door, as required by Kentucky law.

Shortly after the collision, governor Wallace Wilkinson ordered his cabinet to review the state's drunk driving laws and bus safety regulations. At a news conference on May 20, 1988, Wilkinson announced stricter enforcement of drunk driving by the state, including police sobriety checkpoints and more frequent inspections by state Alcoholic Beverage Control. The governor also indicated support for increased safety standards for buses and training for bus drivers, and the state began offering free safety inspections for privately owned buses.

Kentucky now requires all school buses to have nine emergency exits—more than any other federal or state standard. This includes front and back doors, a side door, four emergency windows and two roof exits. The bus that crashed at Carrollton had only front and back exits, which was to be expected, since the bus was built before tougher standards were enacted.

Buses used by Kentucky schools must also have a cage around the fuel tank, a stronger frame and roof to resist crumpling on impact and rollover, high-backed seats, extra seat padding, a fuel system that slows leaks, flame-retardant seats and floors, reflective tape on all emergency exits, an eight-inch (20 cm) wide black band with the district name in white letters on the side, and strobe lights on the exterior. Schools also must have a diesel-powered fleet. (Unlike gasoline, diesel fuel is not highly flammable.) Until 2013, all school buses were diesel-powered, when the law was changed to allow propane buses.

In 1991, Kentucky enacted stricter drunk driving laws.

=== School bus and church bus standards and regulations ===
A contributing factor to the crash itself and the severity seemed to be loopholes between the laws and procedures for a school bus and those involving the same vehicle after it was released from school service, but continued to be used for transporting passengers in non-school use. (Had the bus been built new in March 1977 for the non-school use such as a church activity bus, the applicable federal motor vehicle standards in place at that time would have required it to have been built with more emergency exits than were required for school buses). One of the NTSB recommendations after the Carrollton Bus Disaster was that school buses have no fewer emergency exits than required of non-school buses.

Some states also require that the usually different seating capacities for children and adults be displayed near the service door of school buses and non-school buses. Most states consider secondary school (middle and high school) age students to be adults with regard to the space occupied in bus seats and aisles by their bodies.

=== MADD and drunk-driving prevention ===
The collision riveted the nation's attention on the problem of drunken driving as never before and has been credited in part with causing the steady decline in the number of alcohol-related fatalities. Mothers Against Drunk Driving, a grassroots organization, worked both before and after the Carrollton crash to reduce the hazards created by drunk (or drinking) drivers.

One of the victims, the youngest killed on the bus, was ten-year-old Patricia "Patty" Susan Nunnallee. Patty's mother, Karolyn Nunnallee, became an active member of MADD after the crash, eventually becoming MADD's national president. Patty's mother wrote on MADD's memorial web page to Patty: They were traveling on a school bus, so I thought she'd be safe.

Janey Fair, whose 14-year-old daughter Shannon was killed, become a national volunteer for MADD, and rose within the organization to become national vice president. She was also head of the Kentucky Victims Coalition. According to the MADD website, "MADD helped me find my inner strength and see that life could go on," Janey said. "I have found I can make real changes in people's attitudes about drinking and driving and in how our government addresses this critical problem. Additionally, I can help other victims move forward in their lives." Her husband also became active locally in MADD.

Joy Williams, wife of Lee Williams, a pastor of the church, and their two young daughters, Kristen and Robin, were among those killed. Dotty Pearman's husband, John Pearman, associate pastor at the church and the bus driver, was also killed while their daughter, Christy, was involved in the crash and survived. In the year after the crash, Lee Williams and Dotty Pearman, who barely knew each other before the crash, became friends and eventually married. Lee and Dotty Williams also volunteer for MADD.

== Memorials ==
Ford Motor Company paid for a black marble memorial in North Hardin Memorial Gardens Cemetery in Radcliff, Kentucky. The stone lists the names of all of the persons who were aboard the bus during the crash. The Kentucky Transportation Cabinet has two small signs, one in each direction of I-71, reading "SITE OF FATAL BUS CRASH MAY 14, 1988" at the site of the crash.

Quinton Higgins, one of the survivors of the crash, created a mobile memorial and anti-drunk driving message using a similar model bus to the one in the collision, with the photos of the twenty-seven deceased victims taped to the seats they were sitting in at the time of the crash, and with the message "27 reasons not to drink and drive" written on the exterior black strip. He speaks at schools about bus safety and brings his memorial bus to public safety events.

== Depiction in media ==
Among the many media agencies that provided thorough coverage, The Courier-Journal of Louisville, Kentucky, received the 1989 Pulitzer Prize for General News Reporting for its coverage.

The collision and its aftermath, including efforts of some of the families to obtain more than financial settlements, were chronicled by author James S. Kunen in his 1994 book Reckless Disregard: Corporate Greed, Government Indifference, and the Kentucky School Bus Crash.

In 2013, MADD produced a documentary about the crash titled Impact: After the Crash. Survivors gave their testimony of how their lives were changed after the crash, including how rough it was to recover from their injuries. Mahoney received requests to be interviewed for the movie, but he declined politely.

== See also ==
- Lists of traffic collisions
- List of traffic accidents by death toll in the United States
