= Canal Boulevard =

Canal Boulevard can refer to more than one roadway.

- Canal Boulevard, New Orleans in New Orleans, Louisiana
- Canal Boulevard, Port Richmond in Port Richmond, California
- New Jersey Route 129 in Trenton, New Jersey
