= 1990 Interstate 75 fog pileup =

1990 multi-vehicle traffic collision in Tennessee, United States

Details
- Date: December 11, 1990 c. 9:10am – c. 9:20am (EST)
- Location: Interstate 75 in McMinn County, Tennessee
- Coordinates: 35°19′28.7″N 84°46′56.8″W
- Country: United States
- Incident type: Multi-vehicle traffic collision
- Cause: Loss of visibility due to sudden appearance of dense fog

Statistics
- Vehicles: 99
- Deaths: 12
- Injured: 42

The 1990 Interstate 75 fog pileup was a traffic collision that occurred on the morning of December 11, 1990, on a section of Interstate 75 (I-75) near Calhoun, Tennessee, during dense fog which obscured the visibility of motorists. The collisions occurred in an area where fog is common and had been the site of previous multi-vehicle collisions caused by poor visibility. It consisted of a series of multi-vehicle collisions that ultimately involved 99 vehicles, and resulted in 12 deaths and 42 injuries. It was reportedly the largest motor vehicle collision in United States history when it occurred, in terms of the number of vehicles, and was the largest and second deadliest vehicle accident in Tennessee history behind the 1972 Bean Station bus-truck collision, which killed 14. Suspicion was raised as to whether a nearby paper mill operated by Bowater may have contributed to the foggy conditions. The disaster resulted in multiple safety improvements to the section of I-75 where the collision occurred.

== Background ==
Previous fog-related collisions
Date	Number of vehicles	Casualties
March 9, 1974	18	3 killed, 10 injured
April 19, 1974	9	9 injured
June 12, 1976	4	None
December 16, 1977	14	7 injured
November 5, 1978	62	46 injured
April 15, 1979	18	3 killed, 14 injured

The stretch of I-75 where the collision occurred consists of an approximately 10-mile (16 km) section in Bradley and McMinn counties between mileposts 29 and 39 that is prone to dense fog, which often appears rapidly. It is located about 40 miles (64 km) northeast of Chattanooga and 70 miles (110 km) southwest of Knoxville. The stretch is located within two separate valleys bounded by ridges within the Ridge and Valley Appalachians and is bisected by the Hiwassee River, which forms the boundaries between the two counties. Multiple creeks that span both the valleys that the Interstate is in and adjacent valleys flow into the Hiwassee River near where the Interstate crosses. The Chickamauga Dam, located downstream from this section of the Hiwassee on the Tennessee River, creates a reservoir which backs up into this section of the Hiwassee River, and as a result creates large lakes near the Interstate where creeks run into the Hiwassee. The Hiwassee River bridges are at one of the lowest elevations on I-75 in Tennessee. A paper mill operated by Resolute Forest Products, formerly Bowater, is located on the north bank of the Hiwassee about three miles (4.8 km) east of the Interstate in Calhoun. The plant operates wastewater treatment settling ponds adjacent to the Interstate and owns land on both sides of the Interstate at the accident site. All of these factors have been provided as explanations for why fog is unusually common in this area.

The section of I-75 where the crash occurred was first opened to traffic on December 24, 1973. The first multi-vehicle collision during heavy fog on this section occurred on March 9, 1974. This collision involved 18 vehicles, and resulted in three deaths and 10 injuries. A total of five additional fog-related multi-vehicle collisions occurred along this stretch in the 1970s. The largest of these collisions took place on November 5, 1978, on the Hiwassee River bridges. This collision involved 62 vehicles, and resulted in 46 injuries. The final multi-vehicle collision along this stretch before the 1990 collision occurred on April 15, 1979. This collision involved 18 vehicles, and resulted in three deaths and 14 injuries. Both of these collisions were investigated by the National Transportation Safety Board (NTSB), which concluded that the differing reactions of drivers to the fog were major contributors to the causes of both collisions. Some also questioned if Bowater's nearby settling ponds were a factor in the formation of the fog that preceded these collisions. Bowater denied responsibility for any of the fog that led to these collisions, but reached an out-of-court settlement with family members of two of the victims of the 1979 crash. As a result of the 1979 pileup, the Tennessee Department of Transportation (TDOT) installed dual warning signs the following year which read "Extreme Dense Fog Area Next 5 Miles" along this stretch in each direction, which contained flashing lights that would activate if fog was detected. The Tennessee Highway Patrol (THP) also began sending troopers to each end of the fog zone to ensure that motorists would slow down on foggy days. The northbound sign's lights were reportedly not working on this day, and the southbound sign's lights had been flashing continuously for the past three days, which was believed to have caused some motorists to ignore them.

== Collision and response ==
The collisions began on December 11, 1990, around 9:10 a.m. Eastern Time when a tractor-semitrailer slowed in the southbound lanes of I-75 near the State Route 163 (SR 163) interchange (exit 36) in McMinn County less than one mile (1.6 km) north of the Hiwassee River Bridges. This vehicle was quickly struck from behind by another tractor-trailer that had failed to slow. Both drivers were uninjured and quickly exited their vehicles. At around the same time a passenger car struck the second truck which was then struck by another semi-truck. This collision started a fire which killed the occupants of the car and quickly consumed three vehicles. The collision spread to the northbound lanes around this time when a passenger car slowed near the site of the collision in the southbound lanes and was subsequently struck by another car from behind. These vehicles were then struck by a pickup truck, which started a chain reaction that quickly spread to other vehicles. Over the next several minutes, a series of chain-reaction crashes occurred which ultimately consumed 99 vehicles and resulted in 12 deaths and 42 injuries. Some of the crashes set off multiple explosions and fires. The crash site extended 1/2 mile (0.80 km) north and south of where the crash began. Of the 99 vehicles involved in the crash, 72 had been traveling in the southbound lanes, and 27 in the northbound lanes.

Many of the vehicles involved in the collision were damaged or burned beyond recognition, while others received only minor damage. Some of the injured received severe burns, and some of the victims' bodies were burned beyond recognition. Most survivors and first responders reported having breathing problems due to smoke inhalation. Some of the fires ignited by the crashes burned hot enough to damage the asphalt.

The first 9-1-1 call was received by the Bradley County Sheriff's Office dispatcher at 9:14 a.m., and the first law enforcement officer arrived on the scene three minutes later as the collisions were still occurring. He immediately radioed for back up and emergency medical services. He also sent out a plea for the Interstate to be closed. Within minutes, additional law enforcement and EMS personnel from multiple agencies arrived on the scene. More than 200 rescue personnel, some from as far away as Chattanooga and Knoxville, eventually arrived on the scene. Injured victims from the crash were taken to hospitals in nearby Cleveland and Athens, as well as in Chattanooga and Knoxville. A team of investigators from the NTSB later arrived to investigate the cause of the disaster.

== Investigation ==
Investigators examine the remains of a tractor-trailer involved in the accident

Multiple survivors described the fog as rapidly appearing, with one survivor stating "it was like somebody throwing a blanket across your windshield". The fog was also described by witnesses as unusually thick, obscuring visibility to near zero. One survivor stated that he stood underneath the SR 163 overpass and could not see the bridge above him. Multiple witnesses reported either light fog or no fog at all prior to the collision. Initial reports stated that at least 15 people were killed and more than 50 injured, but investigators later determined that 12 people had been killed and 42 people treated for injuries.

The NTSB report on the collision was released on September 28, 1992. It concluded that the probable cause of the collision was "drivers responding to the sudden loss of visibility by operating their vehicles at significantly varying speeds". The report also identified four major safety issues associated with the crash, and made recommendations to address these issues to a number of agencies including the U.S. Department of Transportation (USDOT), Federal Highway Administration (FHWA), National Highway Traffic Safety Administration (NHTSA), TDOT, THP, multiple local law enforcement agencies, and multiple private companies and organizations. The recommendations to TDOT and the THP included the installation of a fog detection system and a system to warn and slow drivers through the area when fog is present.

Due to the rapid appearance and thickness of the fog, many immediately suspected once again that the nearby Bowater paper mill and its settling ponds may have played a role in the fog's formation. The NTSB report on the collision stated that the settling ponds and steam emitted from the Bowater plant, as well as other nearby plants, may have played a role in the formation of the fog, but did not conclude this with absolute certainty. Many meteorological experts believed that the fog's rapid appearance may have been caused by a temperature inversion, due to the fact that the temperature in the area had varied by 32 °F (18 °C) the previous day, while others also suspected that Bowater may have played a role. A study conducted by the University of Tennessee at the request of TDOT in January 1979 had listed the settling ponds as possible contributors to fog in the area but concluded that further research was needed to confirm this. The report recommended more extensive studies be conducted, and in 1980 the state proposed spending $100,000 (equivalent to $318,639 in 2024) to directly study the emissions from Bowater and whether or not they contributed to the fog, but the study was later cancelled. Critics alleged that the state cancelled the study due to political pressure from Bowater. Bowater also commissioned a study in 1979 in an effort to counter the UT study, which instead concluded that Bowater's emissions did contribute to the fog, but not to what extent. A study conducted by the U.S. Department of Energy in 1981 concluded that the presence of Bowater made dense fog in the area three times more likely than under normal conditions.

== Aftermath ==
Bowater denied any responsibility for the fog that formed on the day of the collision, and instead claimed that dense fog had been a natural occurrence even before the plant had been constructed. Bowater also accused the State of Tennessee of failing to implement necessary fog detection and warning equipment along that stretch of I-75. They did, however, agree to an out-of-court settlement of $10 million (equivalent to $19.1 million in 2024) with 44 victims and family members of victims in January 1994. They also agreed to limit the usage of the 235-acre (95 ha) pond closest to the Interstate.

Others echoed Bowater's criticism of TDOT for failing to implement a proper fog detection system after the accidents in the 1970s. TDOT eventually paid $800,000 to settle lawsuits that alleged negligence of the conditions of the area. As a result of the collision, TDOT instituted several safety measures along this stretch of highway. The stretch of I-75 between mileposts 31 and 39 was designated as a "fog advisory zone" or "fog advisory area", which contains large warning signs on both sides of the road in both directions that warn motorists when they are entering and leaving the area. Most of the roadway was re-striped in this zone with extra painted markings and reflectors to make it more visible to drivers. A $4.5 million (equivalent to $8.8 million in 2024) computerized fog detection system was installed in this area in 1993. This system monitors three miles (4.8 km) of the highway north and south of the Hiwassee River with nine forward scatter visibility sensors, 14 microwave radar vehicle detectors, and 21 closed-circuit television (CCTV) cameras. It is connected to a warning system that contains flashing lights, electronic signs, and variable speed limits within the fog advisory zone, and electronic controlled swing gates which block access to the Interstate from six entrance ramps in and near this stretch in the event of dense fog. The system automatically drops the speed limit from 70 to 50 miles per hour (113 to 80 km/h) when visibility drops below 1/4 mile (0.40 km), and to 35 miles per hour (56 km/h) when the visibility drops below 480 feet (150 m). The swing gates at the entrance ramps activate when visibility drops below 240 feet (73 m). The system began operation in December 1993, and in 2006, a $6.6 million (equivalent to $9.85 million in 2024) upgrade was completed which installed the video cameras. Since the system's implementation, no major multi-vehicle wrecks have occurred along this stretch in foggy conditions. The stretch was first closed due to fog on the mornings of December 15 and 16, 2015.

== In popular culture ==
The collision was the subject of a 1997 Forensic Files episode titled "Killer Fog". Dr. Lawrence Weiss' 2004 book Collision on I-75, published by the American Public Health Association, is about the collision and the events leading up to it. A chapter about the event is included in the 2012 book Tennessee Tragedies: Natural, Technological, and Societal Disasters in the Volunteer State, written by former TEMA official Allen R. Coggins. The first chapter in author Dewaine A. Speaks' 2019 book Historic Disasters of East Tennessee chronicles the event.

== See also ==
- List of traffic accidents by death toll in the United States
