= Prestonsburg, Kentucky, bus crash =

1958 bus crash in Prestonsburg, Kentucky

Coordinates: 37.672199°N 82.719796°W

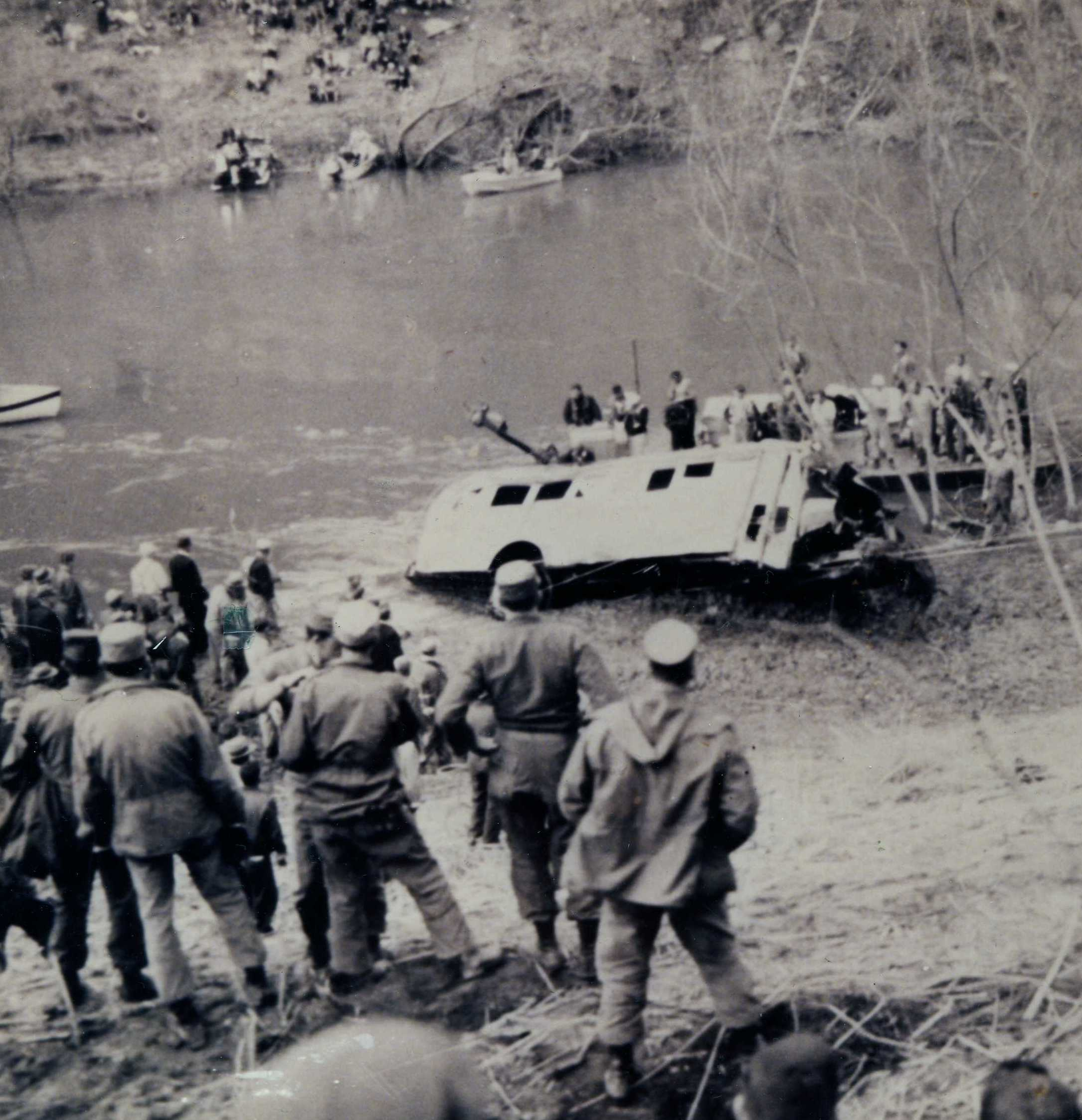
- Recovery of the school bus from the Levisa Fork
- Location of the crash in Floyd County, Kentucky

Details
- Date: February 28, 1958; 8:10 am (EST: UTC−05:00)
- Location: U.S. Route 23 in Floyd County, Kentucky
- Country: United States
- Incident type: Traffic collision

Statistics
- Bus: School bus
- Vehicles: Wrecker truck
- Passengers: 49
- Deaths: 27

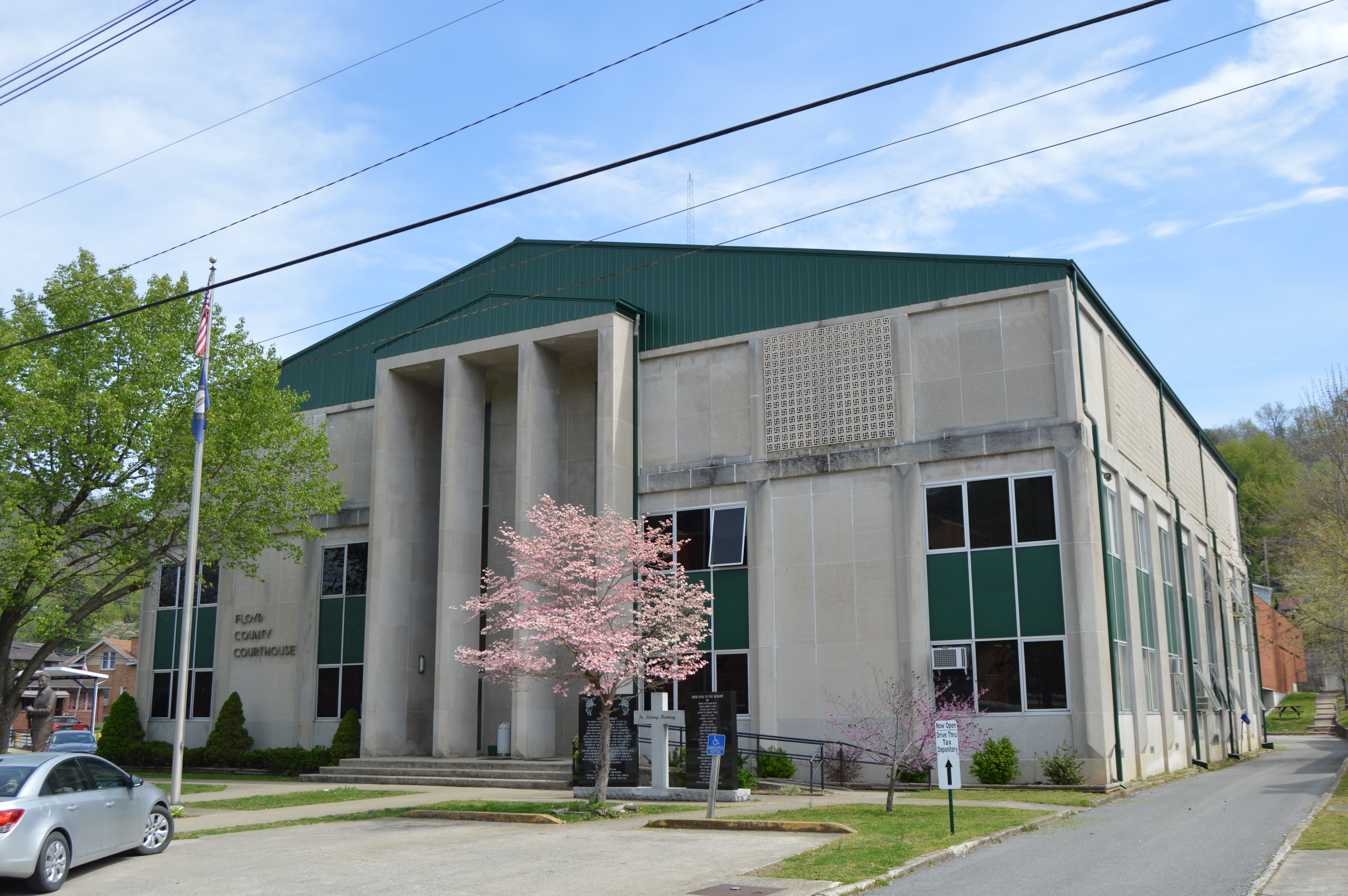
A memorial to the disaster sits in front of the old Floyd County Courthouse in Prestonsburg.

The Prestonsburg, Kentucky, bus crash occurred on February 28, 1958, on U.S. Route 23 in Floyd County, Kentucky, United States, when a school bus carrying 48 elementary and high school students struck the rear of a wrecker truck, causing the bus to plunge into the icy waters of the rain-swollen Levisa Fork of the Big Sandy River. Of the 49 people on board (including the driver), 26 students and the bus driver were killed in the crash.

It is the sixth-deadliest bus crash in United States history and is tied with the 1988 Carrollton bus collision as the deadliest in Kentucky history.

== Crash ==
On February 28, 1958, at 8:10 a.m., Donald Horn slowed his wrecker truck on U.S. Route 23 to investigate a truck that had gone off the road into a ditch. A Floyd County school bus traveling behind him, carrying 48 elementary and high school students bound for Prestonsburg, struck the rear of Horn's truck. The collision caused the bus to swerve across the highway and plunge down an embankment into the Levisa Fork of the Big Sandy River.

Following a period of heavy rain and snowmelt, the river had swollen to 20 feet (6.1 m) above flood stage, creating swift currents and reaching a depth of 30 feet (9.1 m). As the bus submerged and was swept downstream, students broke windows and attempted to evacuate through the rear emergency door.

== Response ==
National Guard and other authorities and agencies responded to the disaster. On March 5, 1958, governor Happy Chandler ordered 500 national guardsmen from 9 different cities to join the effort to find those still missing. The bus was finally located by Navy divers, and removed from the river 53 hours later.

== Victims ==
Twenty-two children escaped the bus in the first few minutes as it sank into the raging floodwaters and made it safely out of the river. However, 26 other children and the bus driver drowned.

1. Rita Cheryl Matney, 8, of Prestonsburg, Kentucky. (Note: Rita Matney's age when she died in the crash differs by a year, depending on which source. The Courier-Journal lists her age as 8, the Messenger lists her age as being 7. The Kentucky National Guard document should be considered as the gold standard as to ages & facts. It lists Matney's age as being 8.)
2. Sandra Faye Cline, 8, of Lancer, Kentucky.
3. Anna Laura Goble, 9, of Emma, Kentucky.
4. James Edison Carey, 9, of Emma, Kentucky.
5. Paulette Cline, 9, of Lancer, Kentucky.
6. James L. Meade Jr., 9, of Lancer, Kentucky
7. John Spencer Goble, 11, of Emma, Kentucky.
8. James Edward Goble, 12, of Emma, Kentucky.
9. John Harlan Hughes Jr., 13, of Lancer, Kentucky.
10. Katie Carol Jarrell, 13, of Sugar Loaf, Kentucky.
11. Jane Carrol Harris, 14, of Emma, Kentucky.
12. Emma Joyce Ann Matney, 14, of Emma, Kentucky.
13. Kenneth Forrest Cisco, 14, of Sugar Loaf, Kentucky.
14. Marcella Jervis, 14, of Emma, Kentucky.
15. Montaine Jervis, 14, of Endicott, Kentucky.
16. Linda Darby, 14, of Cow Creek, Kentucky.
17. Nannie Joyce McPeek, 13, of Lancer, Kentucky. She was predeceased by her parents, Allen Roby McPeek and Roma McPeek. At the time of her death, she was living with the Cline family.
18. Bucky Ray Jarrell, 15, of Sugar Loaf, Kentucky.
19. Doris Faye Burchett, 15, of Emma, Kentucky. Her body was found on April 16, 1958. Her uncle, Graham Burchett, headed volunteer search efforts to help recover bodies from the crash site for months after the crash.
20. James Thomas Ousley, 15, of Lancer, Kentucky.
21. Margaret Louise Hunt, 15, of Cow Creek, Kentucky.
22. Thomas Roosevelt Jarvis, 15, of Buffalo Creek, Kentucky.
23. Glenda May Cisco, 16, of Sugar Loaf, Kentucky.
24. Katherine Justice, 17, of Endicott, Kentucky.
25. Emogene Darby, 17, of Cow Creek, Kentucky.
26. Randy Scott Wallen, 17, of Lancer, Kentucky.
27. John Alex DeRossett, 27, of Prestonsburg, Kentucky. He was the driver of the bus. (Note: The Kentucky National Guard document lists DeRossett's age as being 27.)

== Aftermath ==
The crash would become the impetus behind the formation of the Floyd County Emergency & Rescue Squad, founded by volunteers on April 27, 1958. To this day, the FCERS remains a 100% volunteer agency, and assists local police departments, volunteer fire departments, and EMS with auto extrication, search and rescue, fireground support, and EMS first response in addition to its original role as the primary water rescue agency for the area.

The 27-person death toll is tied with the Carrollton bus disaster in 1988 for the highest number of fatalities resulting from a school bus crash in Kentucky. Both happened in Kentucky and in each, the victims were all thought to have survived the initial collisions, but were unable to safely evacuate the school-type buses afterwards. After the 1988 crash, Kentucky changed its public school bus equipment requirements to require nine emergency exits. This is the highest number of emergency exits required on school buses by any state or Canadian province.

== Depiction in media ==
Several months later, two American recording artists released songs about the crash: The Stanley Brothers, with "No School Bus in Heaven," and Ralph Bowman, with "The Tragedy of Bus 27." Neither made the national Billboard Hot 100 charts, but they did receive regional airplay in some parts of the country.

In recent years the accident has been the subject of two documentary films, The Very Worst Thing and A Life of Its Own, and the site of the bus accident has been marked by a sign bearing a dark image of a school bus superimposed with the names of the children and driver that died. There is usually a wreath of plastic flowers on the guardrail in front of the sign, which is located on Route 1428 (old US 23) 0.6 miles (0.97 km) east of the intersection of Route 302.

== See also ==
- Wayne Corporation – History of a different school bus manufacturer with information about bus safety engineering
- List of traffic accidents by death toll in the United States
