= Mother's Day bus crash =

1999 bus crash in New Orleans, Louisiana

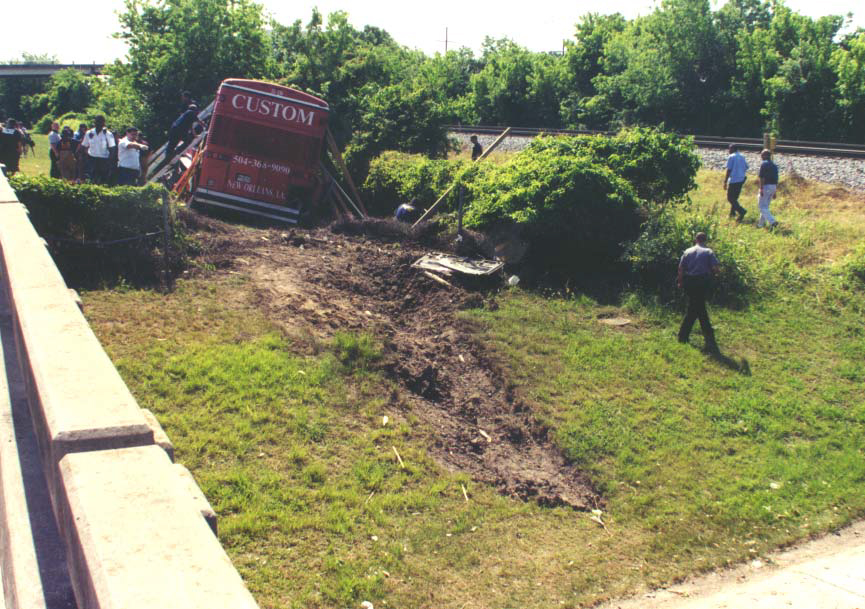
- Rescue workers attempt to stabilize the bus in its final resting position
- Location of the crash in New Orleans, Louisiana

Details
- Date: May 9, 1999; 27 years ago ≈ 9:00 a.m. (CDT; UTC−05:00)
- Location: Interstate 610 in New Orleans, Louisiana
- Coordinates: 29°59′35.01″N 90°05′18.66″W
- Country: United States
- Operator: Custom Bus Charters
- Incident type: Run-off-road collision
- Cause: Driver incapacitation due to a medical emergency; failure of the bus company to monitor the driver's known medical conditions; impairment from ingestion of marijuana and diphenhydramine

Statistics
- Bus: 1997 MCI 102-DL3 motorcoach
- Passengers: 43
- Crew: 1 (Bedell)
- Deaths: 22
- Injured: 22

The Mother's Day bus crash occurred on May 9, 1999, on Interstate 610 (I-610) in New Orleans, Louisiana, United States, when a charter bus carrying 43 passengers veered off the roadway and collided with a dirt embankment. Of the 44 people on the bus (including the driver), there were 22 fatalities in the crash.

The National Transportation Safety Board determined that the driver experienced a medical incapacitation resulting from severe, undiagnosed heart and kidney conditions. Investigators further identified that the medical certification process failed to detect these life-threatening conditions or remove the driver from service. Contributing factors included driver fatigue, as well as the presence of marijuana and a sedating antihistamine in the driver's system at the time of the crash.

The incident remains the deadliest bus crash in Louisiana history and ranks among the most severe commercial motor vehicle disasters in modern United States history.

== Background ==
On May 9, 1999, a social club consisting of mostly senior citizens boarded a charter bus in LaPlace, Louisiana, set to travel to a casino approximately 80 miles (130 km) away in Bay St. Louis, Mississippi, for a Mother's Day outing.

The bus was driven by Frank Augustus Bedell Jr., a 46-year-old driver for Custom Bus Charters. At the time of the crash, Bedell had been working as a commercial bus driver for various motor carriers in the New Orleans area since 1976.

=== Bus ===
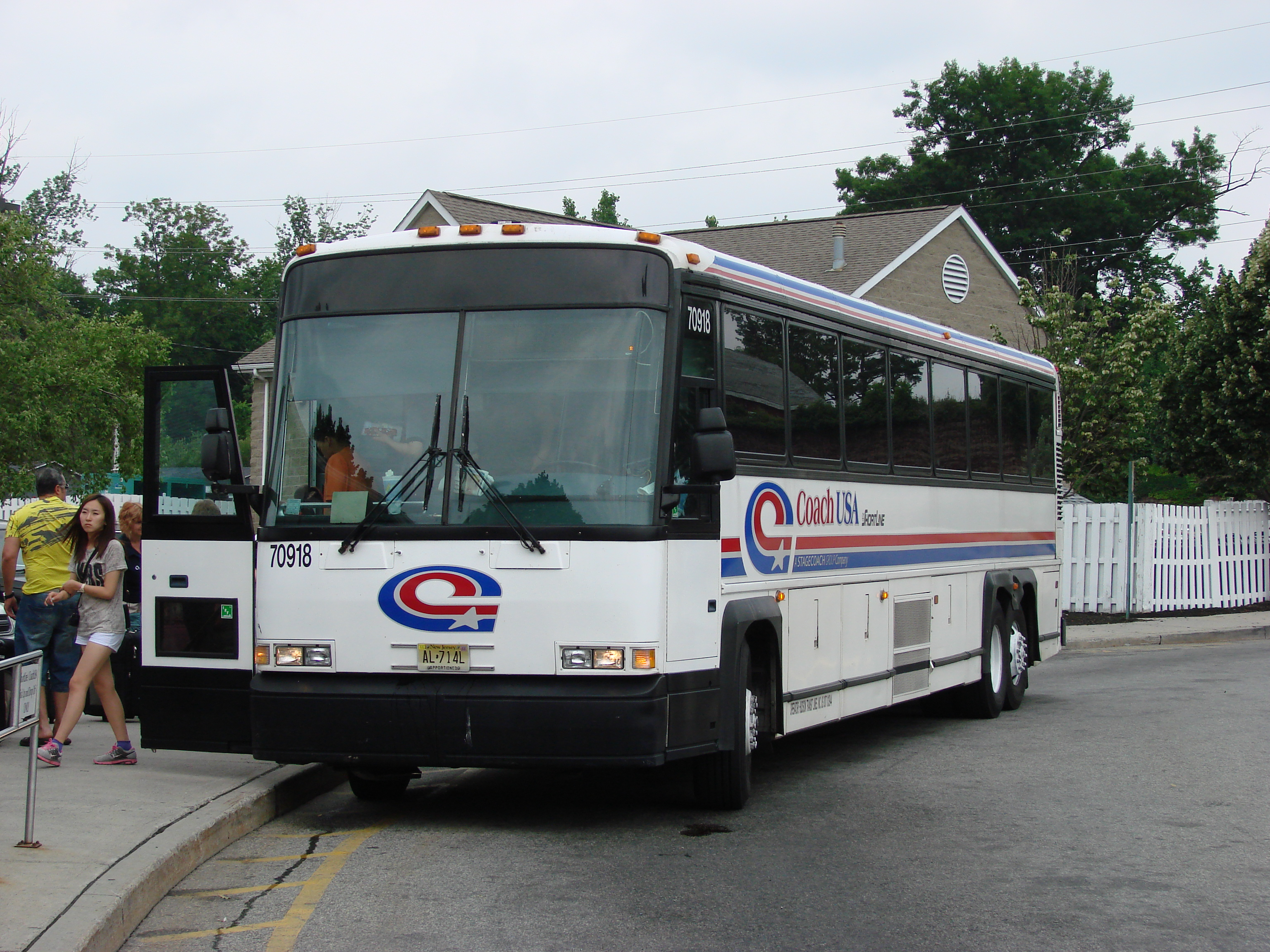
A standard MCI 102-DL3 coach, identical in design to the vehicle involved in the crash

The vehicle involved was a 55-passenger 1997 MCI 102-DL3 motorcoach manufactured in November 1996 at the Motor Coach Industries plant in Pembina, North Dakota. The vehicle was operated by Custom Bus Charters and registered under an Iowa registration, with an overall length of 45.5 feet and an unladen weight of approximately 35,250 pounds.

The motorcoach was powered by a 6-cylinder, 400-horsepower Detroit Diesel Series 60 engine managed by a DDEC III electronic control module. The engine featured a programmed speed governor set at a maximum of 75 mph. At the time of the incident, the motorcoach had accumulated 194,337 miles of operation. The onboard DDEC III module lacked active data logging capabilities, meaning it was not designed to record continuous, real-time operational telemetry such as immediate speed, engine RPM, or braking metrics.

Post-incident engineering examinations verified that the motorcoach had no pre-existing mechanical malfunctions. The tires were properly inflated with safe tread depths, and the commercial air brake apparatus was fully functional. Investigators noted that only one brake push rod was out of ideal adjustment, exceeding the maximum allowable stroke limit by just an eighth of an inch. This was a minor variance that still permitted the brake to generate 90 percent of its total stopping power.

The interior configuration complied with federal transport standards of the era, meaning the driver's seat was the only position equipped with a safety belt. The vehicle was manufactured without passenger seat belts. Although the driver's restraint system was fully functional, it was not worn during the trip. The lack of cabin restraints for the passengers ultimately served as a primary factor in the overall severity of the injuries sustained during the impact.

== Incident ==
=== Prelude ===
Bedell was off duty on May 7 and May 8, the two days preceding the crash. On the afternoon of May 8, he received dialysis treatment at West Jefferson Medical Center but terminated the session early against medical advice, failing to remain for the required post-treatment observation. A few hours later, at 8:45 p.m., he was transported by ambulance back to the emergency room suffering from extremely low blood pressure, weakness, nausea, and dizziness. After receiving intravenous fluids and stabilizing, Bedell was released at 11:00 p.m. According to his mother, whom he lived with, he returned home, went to sleep, and woke up at approximately 5:00 a.m.

On the morning of May 9, 1999, Bedell reported for duty and conducted a pre-trip inspection at 6:30 a.m., before departing the bus terminal in Harvey, Louisiana, at 7:00 a.m. He then drove approximately 30 miles (48 km) to LaPlace for a scheduled 8:00 a.m. pickup at a Delchamps grocery store parking lot. After departing LaPlace, Bedell made an unscheduled but agreed-upon stop in Kenner to pick up additional passengers. At the time of the crash, he was on his way to his final passenger pickup location in eastern New Orleans, located just a short distance from the accident site.

=== Crash ===
At around 9:00 a.m., Bedell was traveling eastbound on Interstate 610 (I-610) in New Orleans. According to witnesses, the bus began to drift between the left and center lanes, nearly striking a smaller vehicle. Inside the cabin, a passenger seated in the third row observed Bedell slump forward at the wheel twice, initially assuming he was reaching for a beverage. Shortly after, when the bus approached milepost 1.6, it veered to the right across all lanes of traffic; it then departed the right side of the highway at a velocity of approximately 60 mph (97 km/h), crossed the shoulder, and entered a grassy slope. The vehicle continued along the slope and struck the terminal end of a guardrail before crashing through a chain-link fence. The bus then became temporarily airborne over a paved golf cart path before colliding with a dirt embankment; the force of the impact caused the bus to bounce and slide forward before coming to rest in an upright position.

=== Response ===
Immediately following the crash, multiple bystanders driving along the interstate pulled over to assist the victims. At 9:02 a.m., a westbound New Orleans Police Department (NOPD) officer observed the heavily damaged charter bus where it had veered off the roadway, parked on the center median, and immediately notified dispatch of the accident.

Initial rescue efforts by the NOPD officer and bystanders were hindered by difficulties accessing the bus interior. After unsuccessfully attempting to break the left-side windows, responders moved to the right side of the vehicle. There, they found multiple victims trapped, including a woman hanging out of a window with her foot caught. While bystanders worked to support her weight, they discovered ejected victims trapped beneath shattered glass outside the bus, and observed several other passengers piled on top of one another near the right-side windows inside the vehicle.

New Orleans Fire Department and emergency medical services (EMS) personnel began arriving at 9:10 a.m. Initial first responders located ten individuals on the ground outside the vehicle, including the bus driver. Because the windows on the left side of the bus were still intact, emergency personnel shattered them to gain entry to the interior and extricate the remaining trapped passengers.

The overall emergency response involved approximately 30 NOPD personnel and nearly 50 members of the New Orleans Fire Department across 12 fire units. City Park Police also responded to assist with traffic control, scene preservation, and stabilizing the bus. Authorities officially cleared the accident scene at 10:51 p.m.

== Victims ==
In total, 22 passengers were killed. Nineteen died at the scene, while three died at the hospital. The bus driver and 15 passengers sustained serious injuries, and six passengers received minor injuries. The deceased ranged in age from 45 to 92 years old.

Nine of the fatally injured passengers and the driver, who survived, were ejected from the bus during the crash. All ten individuals who were ejected were found on the grass at or near the front of the bus.

== Investigation ==
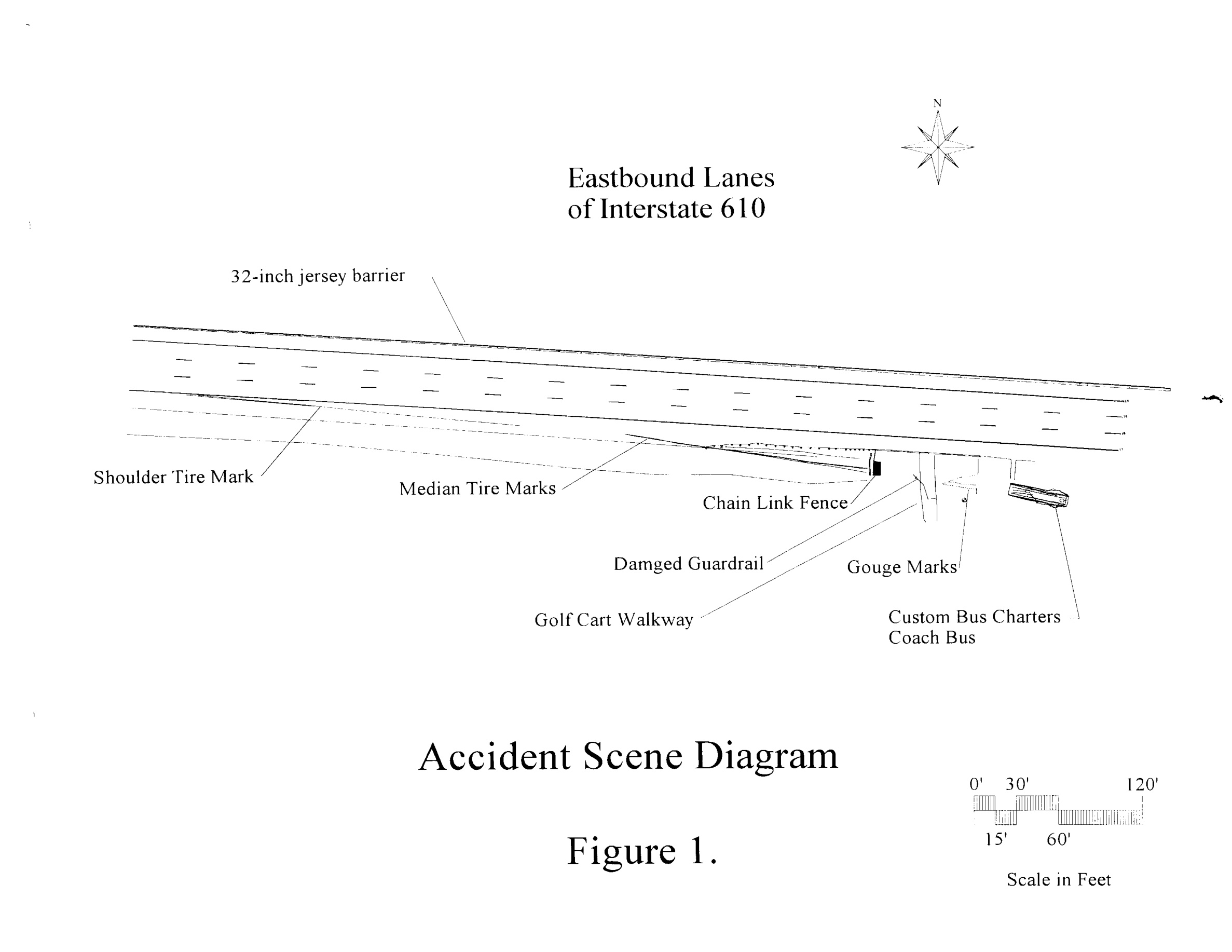
Diagram of the crash scene from the NTSB report

The National Transportation Safety Board (NTSB) responded, conducted an investigation and issued a report on August 28, 2001.

The NTSB determined that "the probable cause of this accident was the driver's incapacitation due to his severe medical conditions and the failure of the medical certification process to detect and remove the driver from service. Other factors that may have had a role in the accident were the driver's fatigue and the driver's use of marijuana and a sedating antihistamine."

=== Custom Bus Charters ===
Custom Bus Charters began operations in 1990 as a limousine service catering to the New Orleans area before expanding into commercial charter operations in 1992. By 1999, the company operated as an interstate, for-hire passenger carrier with operating authority throughout the continental United States and Canada. The company maintained its corporate presence across multiple regional hubs, operating terminals in Harvey, Baton Rouge, and Lafayette, Louisiana, as well as an out-of-state terminal in Council Bluffs, Iowa. From May 1998 to May 1999, the carrier's operations logged a total of 3.2 million miles traveled.

The company's business model was heavily reliant on charter contracts, which accounted for 80 percent of its overall revenue. The remaining 20 percent of its business consisted of a dedicated shuttle service running between downtown New Orleans and the local airport. To support these operations, the company managed a fleet of 45 motorcoaches, 16 shuttle buses, and four 15-passenger vans. The motorcoaches were heavily modernized, maintaining an average fleet age of just two years, and were leased from Financial Services, Inc., of Norwalk, Connecticut.

At the time of the accident, Custom Bus Charters employed 147 workers. This workforce included 57 full-time and 36 part-time drivers, alongside necessary office and maintenance personnel. The average age of the company's drivers was 50 years old.

The company's safety program was overseen by a safety director who had previously served as a company bus driver. A state-certified third-party tester for commercial driver's license (CDL) training, the safety director utilized five of the carrier's most experienced drivers to administer practical road tests to personnel. Corporate responsibilities for the role included the direct inspection of local and long-distance driver logbooks, conducting initial new-hire training, and administering mandatory in-service training every six months. This training curriculum covered motorcoach operation, drug and alcohol testing protocols, highway driving hazards, pre-trip vehicle inspections, and hours-of-service regulations.

In 1996, Custom Bus Charters established a random drug testing program to comply with federal regulations under 49 CFR 382. The company contracted with MRO Associates to manage pre-employment screening, administer random drug testing, and provide a medical review officer (MRO) to evaluate laboratory results. Under this framework, drivers were selected for unannounced testing via a computer-generated program managed by the MRO.

Upon selection, the company's director of operations was notified to order the driver to report to a testing site within three hours. Corporate policy dictated that failing to report within the three-hour window constituted a refusal to test and resulted in immediate termination. Drivers operating active charter lines when selected were issued their testing notices immediately upon returning to the terminal. The carrier maintained a zero-tolerance policy, terminating any driver who returned a positive result. Out of 106 tests administered in 1997, two pre-employment tests returned positive results; in 1998, one out of 100 administered tests was positive. No testing refusals were recorded during either year.

Between 1996 and 1999, the Federal Highway Administration's Office of Motor Carriers conducted three compliance reviews of Custom Bus Charters. The company initially requested a compliance review in early 1996 to secure the satisfactory safety rating required to bid on a military transport contract with the Military Traffic Management Command. On March 27, 1996, the Louisiana State Police conducted the review on behalf of the Office of Motor Carriers. The company was granted a satisfactory rating, despite investigators identifying multiple regulatory deficiencies in driver record-keeping, hours of service compliance, and the drug testing program.

Later that year, on July 10, 1996, Consolidated Safety Services, a civilian contractor auditing carriers for the Military Traffic Management Command, conducted an independent evaluation. The contractor rated the company as unsatisfactory, citing substantially the same core tracking deficiencies. Investigators noted that management had primarily corrected violations tied to specific, individually named drivers rather than resolving systemic flaws in their programmatic record-keeping.

A subsequent federal compliance review in June 1998 downgraded the company's safety rating to conditional. During this audit, inspectors discovered that a driver had falsified the medical examination date on an official medical form, and further identified multiple logging and hours-of-service violations across the fleet.

In March 1999, the Office of Motor Carriers conducted an enforcement follow-up review, which again resulted in a conditional rating. The audit cited the company for operating a motorcoach that failed to comply with local laws and ordinances. Investigators also cited the company for a high accident rate of 2.710 accidents per million miles, calculated based on an estimated 1.8 million miles traveled over the preceding year.

In June 1999, following the crash, the company's safety director formally petitioned the Federal Highway Administration (FHWA) to reconsider the March conditional rating. The petition demonstrated that federal inspectors had omitted the mileage generated by the company's downtown airport shuttle service during their calculation. By factoring in the correct total of 3.2 million miles traveled, the carrier's recalculated accident rate dropped to 0.647 per million miles, a figure well below the national motor carrier average of 1.6. Based on this corrected data, the FHWA retroactively upgraded Custom Bus Charters' official rating from conditional to satisfactory.

Due to the severe legal, financial, and regulatory fallout stemming directly from the crash, Custom Bus Charters permanently dissolved and ceased all business operations on July 1, 1999.

=== Bus driver ===
Undated photo of Bedell

The bus was driven by Frank Augustus Bedell Jr., a 46-year-old driver for Custom Bus Charters. At the time of the crash, Bedell had been working as a commercial bus driver for various motor carriers in the New Orleans area since 1976.

Bedell began his career with Transit Management of Southeast Louisiana in 1976. In October 1977, in an incident unrelated to his employment, he was convicted of felony possession of mescaline and received a suspended two-year prison sentence and a fine. He continued working as a transit driver until March 1989, when he was dismissed after failing two random drug tests for marijuana, the second occurring after he had completed an employee rehabilitation program.

He was later hired by Westside Bus Service in April 1992, where he was involved in a property damage accident before being fired in July 1996 for another positive marijuana test. Bedell then drove shuttle buses for the Hertz Corporation from October 1996 to April 1997, but resigned following his third property damage accident involving company vehicles. That same month, Greyhound Lines rejected his application after he tested positive for cocaine during a pre-employment screening.

Throughout his career, Bedell routinely omitted his previous dismissals and positive drug tests when applying for new positions. Concealing this adverse history, he was hired by Custom Bus Charters in June 1997. During his nearly two years with the company leading up to the crash, Bedell was involved in one reportable property damage accident but had passed his pre-employment drug screen and three random drug tests.

In the two years leading up to the crash, Bedell's health had severely declined. He was hospitalized multiple times for dilated cardiomyopathy (congestive heart failure), kidney failure, and complications from hemodialysis. His intense medical regimen required treatment six days a week: four-hour hemodialysis sessions on Tuesdays, Thursdays, and Saturdays, and three-hour intravenous dobutamine therapy for his heart on Mondays, Wednesdays, and Fridays. Despite classifying Bedell as a full-time employee, Custom Bus Charters scheduled him similarly to a part-time driver to accommodate his frequent treatments.

Bedell held a valid medical examiner's certificate issued in August 1998. Custom had required this examination after Bedell experienced severe shortness of breath during a trip, resulting in a multi-day hospitalization for congestive heart failure. During the examination, Bedell falsely checked "no" regarding any history of kidney or cardiovascular disease on his application. Although the examining physician's written notes explicitly acknowledged Bedell's history of hypertension and congestive heart failure, the doctor still signed the certificate legally qualifying him to drive commercial vehicles.

Prior to the crash, while operating a trip for Custom Bus Charters in Baton Rouge, Louisiana, Bedell contacted a company dispatcher to report that he was suffering from shortness of breath and could not finish the route. He was subsequently replaced by another driver and spent several days hospitalized for symptoms relating to congestive heart failure. In response to this medical event, Custom Bus Charters required Bedell to undergo a medical examination to evaluate his fitness to return to driving.

Bedell survived the crash but was seriously injured after being ejected from the bus upon impact. He spent a month in the hospital, first receiving treatment at Charity Hospital before being transferred to West Jefferson Medical Center for kidney care. While he was hospitalized, post-crash medical analysis confirmed the presence of the sedating antihistamine diphenhydramine and marijuana in his system, with toxicology tests indicating he had ingested the marijuana two to six hours before the accident. After being discharged, he returned to his home in the Algiers neighborhood of New Orleans.

Bedell never formally spoke with police or NTSB investigators about the accident. However, he claimed to his attorney that he lost control of the bus because he had to swerve to avoid a car that suddenly cut in front of him. However, investigators doubted this claim, as it was contradicted by multiple witnesses. An eyewitness driving directly behind the bus noted that the bus had drifted toward a smaller car, rather than the car cutting off the bus. Furthermore, surviving passengers with clear views of the road reported no sudden evasive maneuvers or other vehicles blocking the bus's path prior to the crash.

At the time, Bedell was the sole target of a criminal investigation into the crash led by the New Orleans Police Department. In late July 1999, the department forwarded its completed report to prosecutors, officially recommending that Bedell be charged with vehicular homicide, first-degree vehicular negligent injuring, reckless operation of a vehicle, and driving while intoxicated. Before formal indictments could be filed, Bedell collapsed at his home on August 1, 1999, while talking on the telephone. He was transported by ambulance to Charity Hospital, where doctors attempted to revive him for approximately half an hour before he was pronounced dead of heart failure at 9:11 p.m.

Following his death, the Orleans Parish District Attorney's office confirmed that because Bedell was the only target of the investigation, no criminal charges would be filed in connection with the crash.

== Aftermath ==
=== Reform of the Federal Motor Carrier Safety Administration ===
The investigation of the crash highlighted critical deficiencies in federal safety oversight, which directly influenced the passage of the Motor Carrier Safety Improvement Act of 1999. Signed into law on December 9, 1999, the Act fundamentally restructured federal transportation oversight by separating the Office of Motor Carriers from the Federal Highway Administration to establish the independent Federal Motor Carrier Safety Administration.

The legislation introduced several mandates aimed at tightening drug testing protocols within the commercial transportation industry. One primary directive required the Secretary of Transportation to conduct a formal study within two years to evaluate the feasibility of two critical reporting mechanisms:

- Requiring medical review officers or employers to report all verified positive controlled substance test results for drivers subject to 49 CFR Part 382 to the state that issued the driver's commercial driver's license.
- Requiring prospective employers to query the state that issued a commercial driver's license for records of any verified positive controlled substance test results before hiring a new driver.

By mandating these studies, the Act aimed to eliminate the systemic loopholes that previously allowed drivers with positive drug test results to continue operating commercial vehicles across state lines.

== Memorials ==
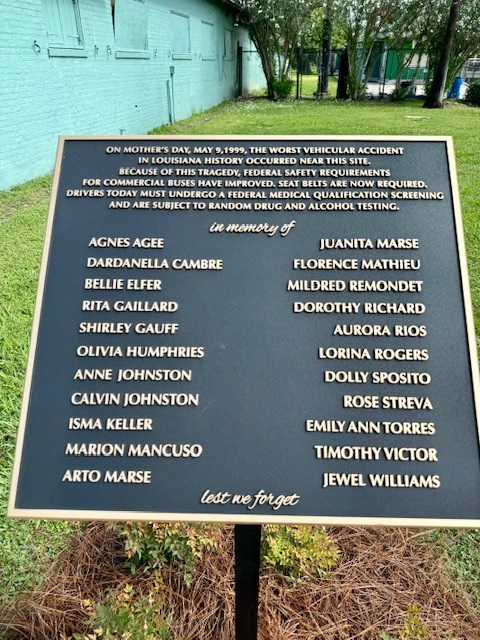
The memorial plaque outside Pan American Stadium, inscribed with the names of the 22 victims.

In 2019, filmmaker and historian Royd Anderson began leading a formal campaign to place a memorial in City Park. Anderson argued that a low-cost, privately funded monument would provide a safe, accessible place for families to reflect on the crash.

The proposal faced administrative hurdles, as the City Park Conservancy was engaged in a multi-year master planning process. Throughout 2025, the conservancy emphasized that any memorial would need to be integrated into the park’s comprehensive renovations, which required extensive community input and design review. By early 2026, those efforts reached a breakthrough when the park leadership and organizers reached an agreement on the site's location.

Following a successful public fundraising campaign, a memorial plaque was dedicated in May 2026 outside Pan American Stadium at City Park in New Orleans, located near the Interstate 610 embankment where the bus veered off the roadway. The dedication ceremony was attended by surviving family members, including relatives of Shirley Gauff, who had organized the original casino trip.

== Depiction in media ==
A documentary titled Mother's Day Bus Crash on 610 was made by New Orleans filmmaker and historian Royd Anderson. It focuses on the crash, its impact on victims’ families, and firsthand recollections of the event. It debuted in 2019 and examines the tragedy through interviews with eyewitnesses, survivors’ relatives, firefighters, and lawyers involved in the aftermath.

The incident is also featured as a dedicated chapter in Anderson's 2021 book, New Orleans Disasters: Firsthand Accounts of Crescent City Tragedy, published by The History Press. The book details the operational and medical failures surrounding the crash alongside other major 20th-century regional catastrophes, including the 1976 Luling ferry disaster and the 1982 crash of Pan Am Flight 759.

== See also ==
- List of traffic accidents by death toll in the United States
