= Lists of traffic collisions =

The following is a list of articles that contain a lists of traffic collisions, or list of people who died in traffic collisions.

== Lists of traffic collisions ==
- List of traffic collisions (before 2000)
- List of traffic collisions (2000–present)
- List of traffic collisions by death toll
- List of traffic accidents by death toll in the United States
- Multiple-vehicle collision § Major pileups

== Lists of deaths in traffic collisions ==
- List of deaths by motorcycle crash
- List of people who died in traffic collisions

== See also ==
- List of level crossing crashes
- List of racing cyclists and pacemakers with a cycling-related death
- List of driver deaths in motorsport
