= Interstate 610 (Louisiana) =

Highway in Louisiana

Interstate 610
- I-610 highlighted in red

Route information
- Auxiliary route of I-10
- Maintained by Louisiana DOTD
- Length: 4.52 mi (7.27 km)
- Existed: 1956–present
- NHS: Entire route

Major junctions
- West end: I-10 at Metairie–New Orleans line
- US 90 in New Orleans
- East end: I-10 in New Orleans

Location
- Country: United States
- State: Louisiana
- Parishes: Jefferson, Orleans

Highway system
- Interstate Highway System; Main; Auxiliary; Suffixed; Business; Future; Louisiana State Highway System; Interstate; US; State; Scenic
← LA 609	→ LA 610

Interstate 610 (I-610) is a 4.52-mile-long (7.27 km) auxiliary route of I-10 that lies almost entirely within the city limits of New Orleans, Louisiana, bypassing its Central Business District.

== Route description ==
From the west, I-610 begins at the Jefferson–Orleans parish line, also the line between unincorporated Metairie and the city of New Orleans. Initially a four-lane freeway, I-610 branches off of I-10 at exit 230 as it crosses over the 17th Street Canal into the Lakeview neighborhood of New Orleans. While I-10 swings southward toward the Central Business District via the Pontchartrain Expressway, I-610 heads due east through a partial cloverleaf interchange (exit 1A) connecting with the one-way couplet of West End and Pontchartrain boulevards. This interchange also serves to connect westbound I-610 to eastbound I-10. Immediately to the east, exit 1A also encompasses a tight diamond interchange with Canal Boulevard, a divided north–south thoroughfare in Lakeview.

Widening to six lanes, I-610 begins to parallel the Norfolk Southern Railway (NS) line as it crosses the Orleans Avenue Drainage Canal from Lakeview into City Park. After passing Pan American Stadium, I-610 crosses Bayou St. John into the city's 7th Ward and becomes an elevated freeway for the remainder of its route. The 7th Ward, which overlaps the city's Gentilly neighborhood, is served by four exits, beginning with St. Bernard Avenue (2A) and Paris Avenue (2C), which form two halves of a diamond interchange. Next is a partial interchange with US Highway 90, which transitions from North Broad Street to the one-way couplet of Allen and New Orleans streets. This exit (2B) consists of an eastbound entrance and westbound exit. Closely following is exit 3, consisting of a diamond interchange with Louisiana Highway 3021 (Elysian Fields Avenue), a major divided thoroughfare that also provides access to Dillard University and the University of New Orleans.

Nearing the end of its route, I-610 is reduced to its original four-lane capacity while passing through an interchange with Franklin Avenue (exit 4). Consisting of an eastbound exit and westbound entrance, the remaining movements are provided via exit 238A on I-10, as I-610 curves northeast to merge with I-10 once again. Through traffic continues on I-10 into New Orleans East en route to Slidell across Lake Pontchartrain.

=== Route classification and data ===
I-610 is classified as an urban Interstate by the Louisiana Department of Transportation and Development (DOTD). Daily traffic volume in 2013 averaged between 68,000 and 70,900 vehicles over the entire route. The posted speed limit is 60 mph (97 km/h).

== History ==
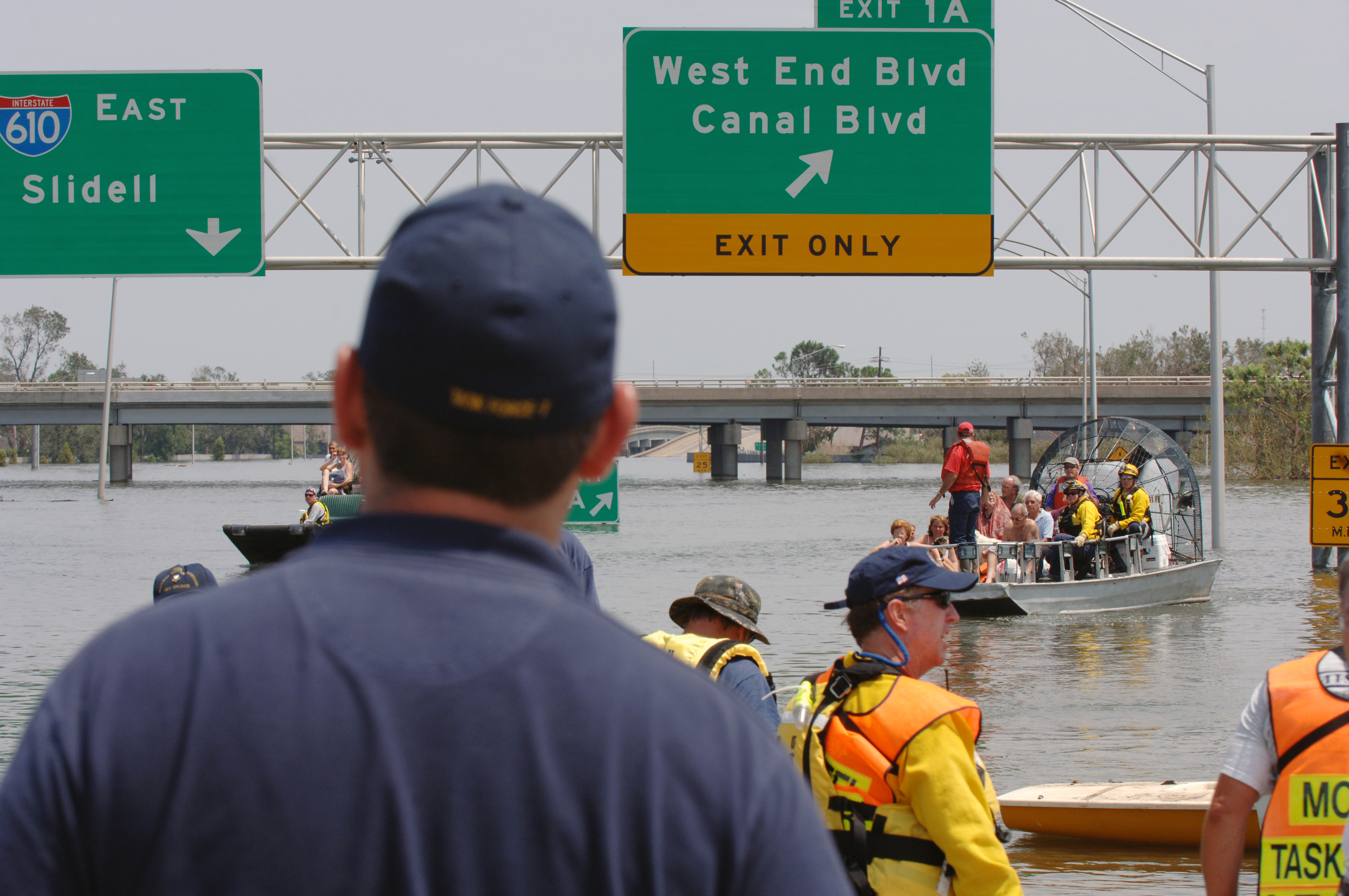
Flooding on I-610 in the aftermath of Hurricane Katrina in 2005

The idea for I-610 goes back to around 1956, when a consultant firm proposed building a federal-aid highway along the current route next to an existing railroad. The proposed route would cut through City Park. During public hearings in 1958, there was much debate about the highway cutting through the park.

The state purchased the right-of-way in City Park in 1966 and began construction of I-610 in 1971. In 1972, a lawsuit was filed, citing that the project violated a 1968 law forbidding the use of parkland as a route for highways unless there was no other alternative route and steps were taken to mitigate park damage. The state eventually prevailed, and I-610 was completed in the late 1970s.

On May 9, 1999, Interstate 610 was the site of the Mother's Day bus crash, the deadliest bus accident in Louisiana history. A charter motorcoach carrying 43 passengers eastbound veered off the right side of the highway at milepost 1.6. The vehicle traveled down a side slope, struck a guardrail, crashed through a chain-link fence, and collided heavily with a dirt embankment within City Park. The disaster resulted in 22 passenger fatalities, while the driver and 21 remaining passengers sustained injuries.

== Future ==
There are calls to remove I-10 from the Claiborne Expressway in New Orleans and rename I-610 to I-10. The entire length of the Pontchartrain Expressway would likely be renamed as I-910 or I-49. The movement to remove the expressway received backing from President Joe Biden in April 2021. However, in October 2022, the governments of Louisiana and New Orleans introduced a $94.7 million proposal to improve the Claiborne Expressway and the space beneath it as well remove four ramps in Tremé. The proposal asked for a $47 million grant for the project. The removal of expressway was estimated to cost over $4 billion and have a negative economic impact as well as increase traffic throughout the region.

== Exit list ==
Parish	Location	mi	km	Exit	Destinations	Notes
Jefferson–Orleans parish line	Metairie–New Orleans line	0.000– 0.112	0.000– 0.180		I-10 west – Baton Rouge	Western terminus; exit 230 on I-10
Orleans	New Orleans	0.216– 1.134	0.348– 1.825	1A	West End Boulevard / Canal Boulevard	No westbound exit to West End Boulevard; also connects with LA 3019 (Veterans Highway) not signed on I-610
Orleans	New Orleans	0.556	0.895	1B	I-10 east – New Orleans Business District	Westbound exit only
Orleans	New Orleans	2.567– 2.581	4.131– 4.154	2A	St. Bernard Avenue	Eastbound exit and westbound entrance
Orleans	New Orleans	3.248– 3.468	5.227– 5.581	2C	Paris Avenue	To New Orleans Fair Grounds; eastbound entrance and westbound exit
Orleans	New Orleans	3.484– 3.646	5.607– 5.868	2B	US 90 west (New Orleans Street, North Broad Street)	Eastbound entrance and westbound exit
Orleans	New Orleans	3.754– 4.166	6.041– 6.705	3	LA 3021 (Elysian Fields Avenue)	To Dillard University and University of New Orleans
Orleans	New Orleans	4.269– 4.287	6.870– 6.899	4	Franklin Avenue	Eastbound exit and westbound entrance; remaining movements via I-10 exit 238A
Orleans	New Orleans	4.589– 4.919	7.385– 7.916		I-10 east – Slidell	Eastern terminus; exit 238B on I-10
1.000 mi = 1.609 km; 1.000 km = 0.621 mi: Incomplete access
