= 2016 I-10 tour bus crash =

2016 bus incident in California, United States

Details
- Date: October 23, 2016; 5:17 a.m. PDT
- Location: I-10 in Palm Springs
- Coordinates: 33.905066°N 116.553027°W

Statistics
- Deaths: 13
- Injured: 30

The 2016 I-10 tour bus crash was a vehicle accident that occurred on Interstate 10 (I-10) in Palm Springs, California on October 23, 2016, when a tour bus slammed into the back of a semi-trailer truck. The crash killed 13 and injured 30 others.

== Incident ==
The tour bus was heading westbound, returning to Los Angeles with 42 adult passengers from an excursion to a casino in Thermal, when it impacted the rear of the stationary truck soon after 5 a.m., at an estimated 74–79 miles per hour (119–127 km/h). The speed caused the trailer to penetrate approximately 15 feet (4.6 m) into the bus. The bus driver, Teodulo Elias Vides, who owned the tour bus company, and 12 passengers were killed. 30 other passengers were injured. The truck driver, Bruce Guilford, was unharmed, but was hospitalized for observation.

== Investigation and trial ==
Immediately following the accident, the National Transportation Safety Board sent a disaster crew to investigate the crash. The report established that both drivers had been seriously sleep-deprived and that Guilford had falsified his driver logs to conceal his having driven more than the maximum number of hours without rest. He had fallen asleep and his truck had remained stationary after the highway reopened following a temporary closure; Vides, an undiagnosed diabetic who had also had very little sleep in the days before the accident, had not reacted in time to avoid colliding with the truck. The bus also had two substandard tires and was not equipped with seat belts.

Guilford was arrested in October 2017 and the following month was extradited from the state of Georgia and charged with 13 counts of felony vehicular manslaughter and other related charges. After a preliminary hearing, he was ordered held on $500,000 bail before his trial.

In August 2019, he pleaded guilty to all charges and was sentenced to four years in state prison.
