= Yuba City bus disaster =

Deadly school bus crash in Martinez, California

Coordinates: 38.0244°N 122.1110°W

Details
- Date: May 21, 1976; 10:55 AM
- Operator: Student Transportation Lines, Inc
- Cause: Brake failure due to insufficient maintenance, driver training, driver proficiency

Statistics
- Passengers: 53
- Deaths: 29
- Injured: 24

The Yuba City bus disaster occurred on May 21, 1976, in Martinez, California, United States. A chartered school bus transporting 52 passengers came off an elevated off ramp, left the roadway, and landed on its roof. There were 53 people on the bus, passengers and a driver. Twenty nine people died; 28 students and an adult adviser were killed in the crash.

It remains the deadliest highway disaster ever investigated by the National Transportation Safety Board (NTSB) since its creation.

== Incident ==
On May 21, 1976, Yuba City High School chartered a Crown Coach Corporation school bus from Student Transportation Lines, Inc. to transport its a cappella choir from Yuba City, California, to Miramonte High School in Orinda for a friendship day involving the choirs of the two schools. The company supplied a Crown bus, which was built in 1950.

The accident occurred at 10:55 a.m., as the driver, Evan Prothero, 49, of Olivehurst, took the Marina Vista Avenue off-ramp (exit 56) from I-680 southbound from the Benicia–Martinez Bridge. Prothero was unfamiliar with this bus, and mistook the low air pressure warning (for the air brakes) for a warning of low engine oil pressure. Intending to stop for oil, the driver was exiting the freeway, when the air brakes failed due to lack of air pressure. The bus struck the mounted bridge rail and fell 21 feet from the elevated roadway, landing on its roof, crushing it to the base of the window line.

== Victims ==
Out of the 53 people on board, 28 students and an adult advisor, 25-year-old Cristina C. Estabrook, were killed. The following students lost their lives in the disaster:

- Constance J. Adkins (17)
- Marla L. Azim (15)
- Bonnie D. Barfield (18)
- Ruth A. Bowen (16)
- Thomas W. Brooks (18)
- Rachel A. Carlson (16)
- Danielle C. Cote (15)
- Carrie L. Emmrich (15)
- Carlene D. Engle (18)
- Sharlene R. Engle (18)
- Pamela S. Engstrom (18)
- James B. Frontz (17)
- Cynthia L. Graham (17)
- Steven A. Gust (17)
- Amy K. Hicks (18)
- Lynda K. Huston (16)
- Lorie J. Killingsworth (18)
- Joanne A. Matson (15)
- Jodi L. McCoy (18)
- Marti A. Melani (18)
- Catherine R. Mudge (16)
- Bobby R. Ortega (16)
- Robert F. Randolph (17)
- Lawrence H. Rooney (15)
- Seth T. Rosebrough (16)
- Larry R. Shearer (14)
- Robert J. Stafford (17)

All of the surviving passengers were injured, most critically. The driver survived the crash but was seriously hurt. Daniel I. Wright, 15, died later on May 24, 1976, at the Highland Hospital in Oakland, California due to the injuries he sustained in the crash.

== Investigation ==
The accident was investigated by the National Transportation Safety Board, which it attributed to the unfamiliarity and inexperience of the driver with the design of the 26-year-old bus and his confusion with oil pressure and air pressure warnings. Contributing to the accident were:

1. The failure of the air compressor drivebelt
2. The failure of the maintenance program and pre-trip inspection to detect and replace the deteriorated air compressor drivebelt
3. The failure of the signing system to adequately alert the driver to the critical geometrics of the ramp
4. The severe radius of the curvature of the ramp
5. The design of the curb as part of the ramp railing
6. A bridge rail system that did not redirect the bus.

In response to the accident, training and testing for school bus drivers has been improved, plus the design and construction of school buses has been improved. Additionally pre-trip and post-trip inspections and repairs are now more enhanced.

== Memorials ==
The Yuba City bus disaster was the second-worst bus disaster in U.S. history, exceeded only by the 1963 train-bus collision in Chualar, California, which claimed the lives of 32 Mexican farmworkers.

In May 1996, on the twentieth anniversary of the accident, a memorial built near the water at the Martinez Marina was dedicated to the victims. Bearing the names of those who died, it was constructed by firefighters who had responded to the accident and their friends and largely funded by them and donations they obtained. On the 35th anniversary of the accident in May 2011, Contra Costa County firefighters dedicated a monument in Yuba City.

In 2015, the I-680 freeway off-ramp was replaced with one having a longer and flatter approach.
