= 1972 Bean Station bus-truck collision =

Bus/semi-truck collision in Tennessee, United States

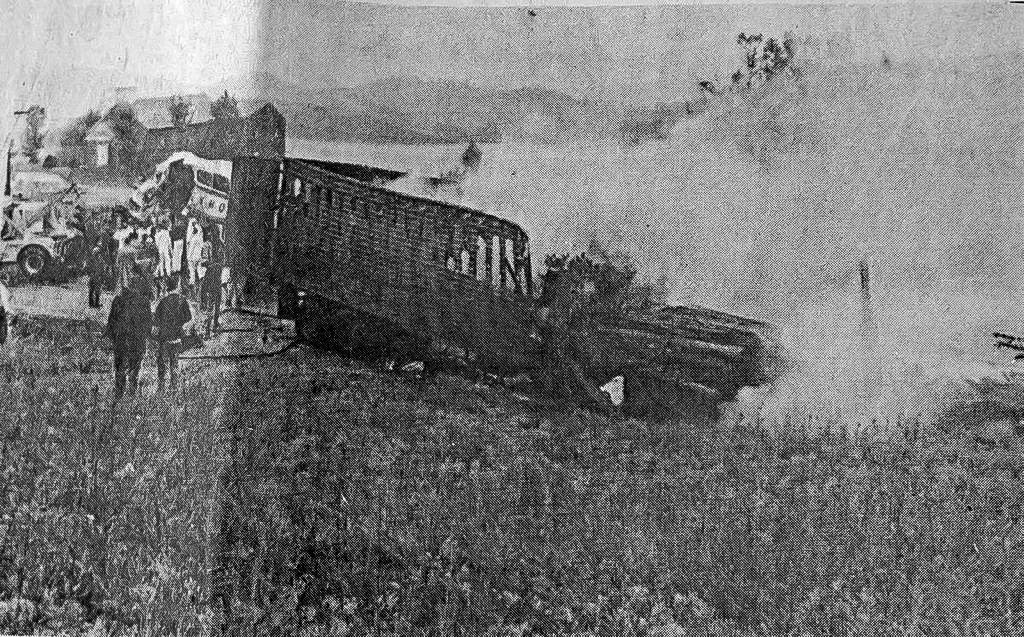

Details
- Date: May 13, 1972 c. 5:35 a.m. (EDT)
- Location: U.S. Route 11W; 5.2 mi (8.4 km) west from Bean Station, Tennessee
- Coordinates: 36°19′52″N 83°22′08″W
- Country: United States
- Operator: Greyhound
- Incident type: Head-on collision
- Cause: Operator error, distracted driving

Statistics
- Bus: 1
- Vehicles: 1 (tractor-trailer)
- Passengers: 27 (bus), 1 (tractor-trailer)
- Deaths: 14
- Injured: 15

The 1972 Bean Station bus-truck collision was a head-on collision involving a double-decker Greyhound bus and a tractor-trailer on U.S. Route 11W in Grainger County, Tennessee, that occurred near the town of Bean Station on the morning of May 13, 1972.

Ultimately resulting in 14 deaths, the collision is the deadliest and one of the worst in the history of Tennessee. The collision led to outcry from politicians and citizens calling for traffic safety and infrastructure improvements, such as highway widenings, and the completion of Interstate 81 in Tennessee.

== Background ==
Previous to the collision, US 11W was known for having a history of high collision and fatality rates throughout several decades, giving the highway the moniker Bloody 11W. The stretch of US 11W between Knoxville and Bristol has been labeled as one of the most dangerous and deadliest stretches of highway in the state of Tennessee and the nation.

US 11W, prior to the completion of I-81, was considered by freight, commuter, and interstate traffic as the principal route from Bristol to Knoxville. With this, the highway experienced extreme congestion that was not suitable for its then existing two-lane, curvy design and 65 miles-per-hour speed limit between Knoxville and Bristol, leading to a high number of collisions with severe injuries and fatalities. In a one-year span previous to the 1972 collision, US 11W had experienced 1,068 collisions and 35 fatalities. Public awareness of this situation was reflected in bumper stickers alluding to the disturbing history of the highway.

== Incident ==
Around 4:45 a.m, the double-decker bus (a PD-4501 Scenicruiser) operated by Greyhound departed from Knoxville en route to Roanoke, Virginia. The bus had traveled eastward along US-11W for 42.4 miles (68.2 km) in 50 minutes, averaging a speed of 50 miles per hour (80 km/h). The tractor-trailer had departed at 8:53 a.m. on the previous day from a manufacturing facility in Lancaster, Pennsylvania, en route to Memphis. The tractor-trailer had driven 517 miles (832 km) west in a period of 20.5 hours before reaching the site of the collision.

The Greyhound bus had approached the site tailing a slow-moving car in the eastbound lane around 5:35 a.m. The bus then attempted to pass the automobile by crossing into the oncoming westbound lane, into the path of the tractor-trailer. The two vehicles then collided head-on, killing the truck driver, bus driver, and 12 of the bus's passengers instantly.

== Investigation ==
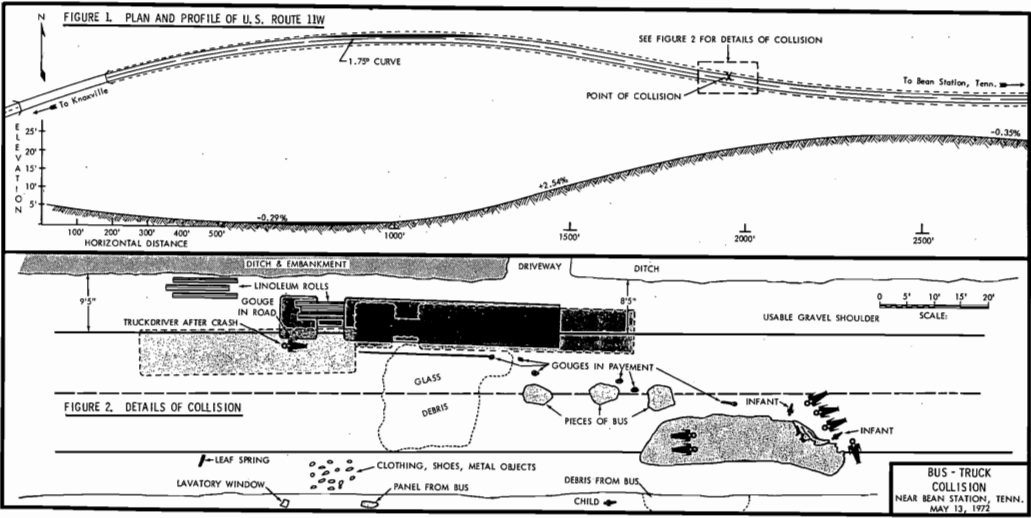
Collision site diagram of the 1972 Bean Station bus-truck collision composed by NTSB.

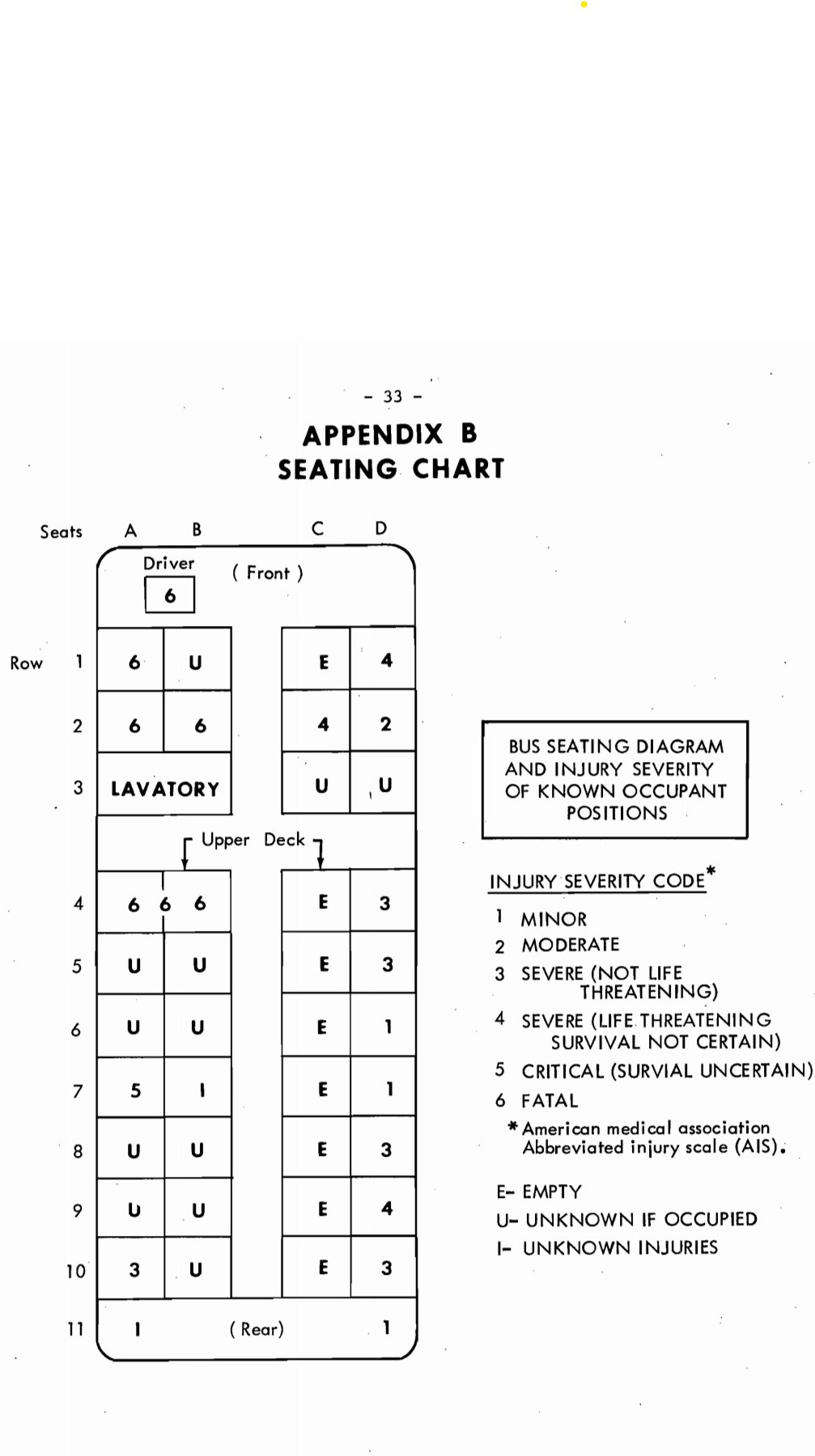
Seating chart of bus passengers with medical condition

The National Transportation Safety Board (NTSB) began an investigation on the crash in 1973 and completed a 38-page report on the collision. The report would be issued to the public in February 1974.

The NTSB concluded that the probable cause of the collision was the Greyhound bus driver's attempt to pass the automobile with the view of the westbound semi-truck being obstructed. The driver also failed to avoid the truck for unknown reasons.

On the night previous to the collision, the bus driver checked into a Knoxville hotel around 4 p.m. A night clerk for the hotel had awakened the bus driver at 1 a.m. the day of the collision, and the driver checked out of the hotel one hour later. Following questioning by the NTSB, the clerk offered that the driver had a drowsy appearance on his departure from the hotel. A partial autopsy on the bus driver reported negativity on drug usage. Officials were unable to perform an autopsy on the truck driver following extensive burn damage beyond recognition.

While the investigation suggested that there were no indications that the design of US 11W or the conditions of the truck and bus contributed to the collision, the possibilities were not entirely ruled out.

The stretch of US 11W where the collision had occurred was not featured with double yellow lines, which possibly led to the bus driver attempting to pass the slow-moving automobile ahead of it.

The lack of restraints for passengers of the bus contributed to several fatalities of those on-board by ejection from the bus.

The NTSB concluded the report with recommendations on seat belt legislation for bus passengers, and impact protection advancements on interior paneling surrounding windows on buses.

== Aftermath ==
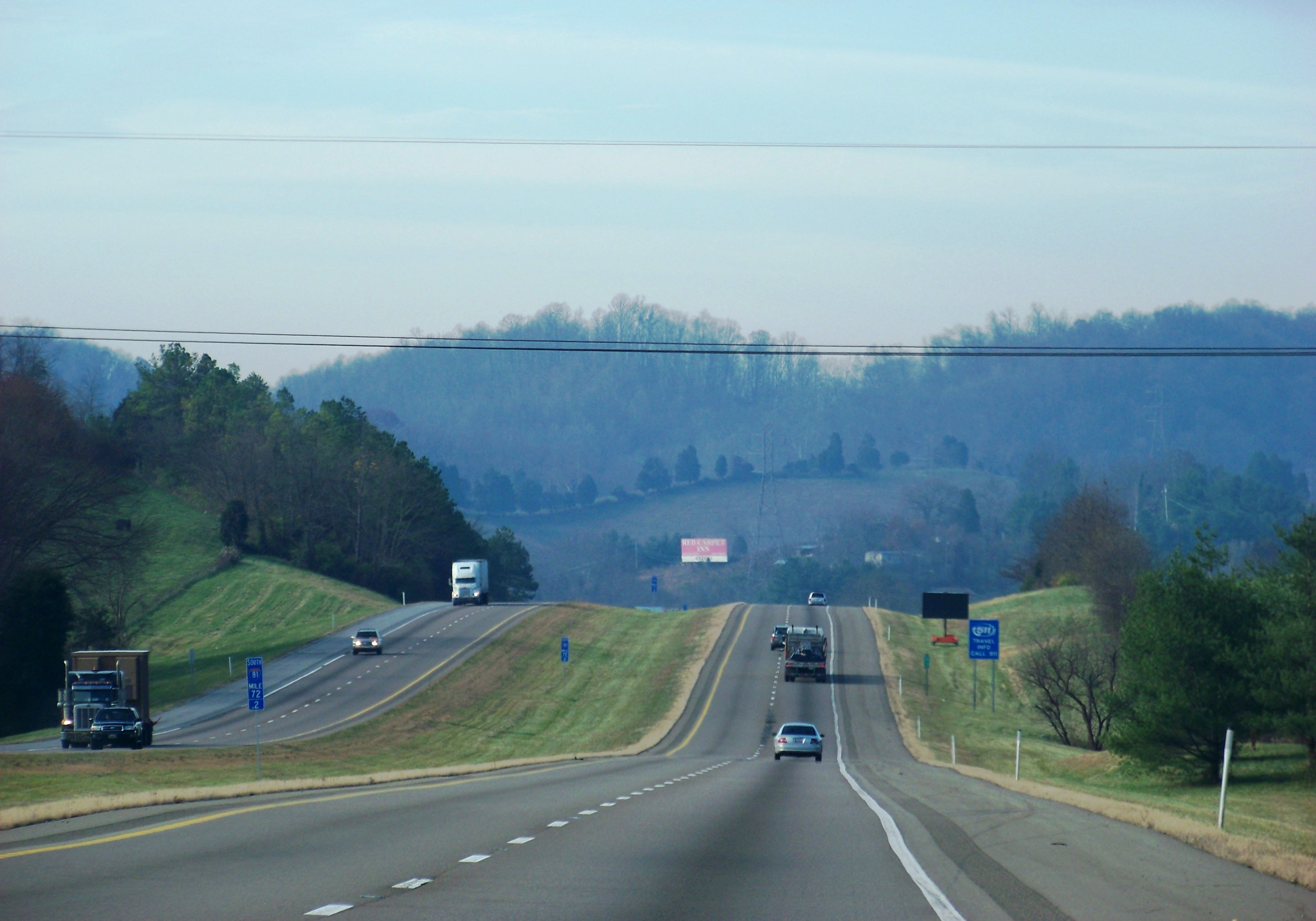
Interstate 81, which mostly paralleled the US 11W corridor, was pushed to completion in 1975 after stagnation on construction following the bus-truck collision in Bean Station.

Led by the widow of one of the passengers aboard the bus, survivors of the crash and other family members of the victims filed a federal lawsuit against Greyhound Lines for $2.5 million. Courts found Greyhound Lines to be at fault for the collision, regarding the failure to take action on the driver of the bus involved in the collision, who had a history of diabetes, heart and liver disease, and several other severe medical conditions which were disclosed following the investigation by the NTSB and Tennessee officials.

In 1973, one year following the collision, Tennessee legislators from the House and Senate chambers formed a special-joint investigation committee into the crisis regarding 11W and its ill-fated past. The committee members billed 11W as one of the "killer highways" of the United States. The committee held several public forums in cities along the 11W corridor, including Knoxville, Rutledge, Rogersville, and Kingsport. Attendees of the forums brought up several statements concerning 11W, such as the highway being possibly cursed, first-hand experiences of collisions, and property owners willing to donate land for the widening of the highway in order to prevent further accidents.

Individuals ranging from activists, state and local politicians, engineers, and journalists considered the collision a call to action for the widening of heavily trafficked highways in the state such as U.S. 11W and the completion of then under construction Interstate 81 from Bristol to Dandridge, which paralleled the route of 11W.

Because of the heavy truck traffic on that highway (US-11W), it was just a matter of time until something like this happened.

— Tennessee Highway Patrol Captain Guy Nicholson

Governor Winfield Dunn called for action to widen 11W from two to four lanes in its entirety from Kingsport to Knoxville, stating:

The record of Highway 11W is written in tragedy and demands the action of responsible people including the governor; this I intend to do.

— Governor Winfield Dunn

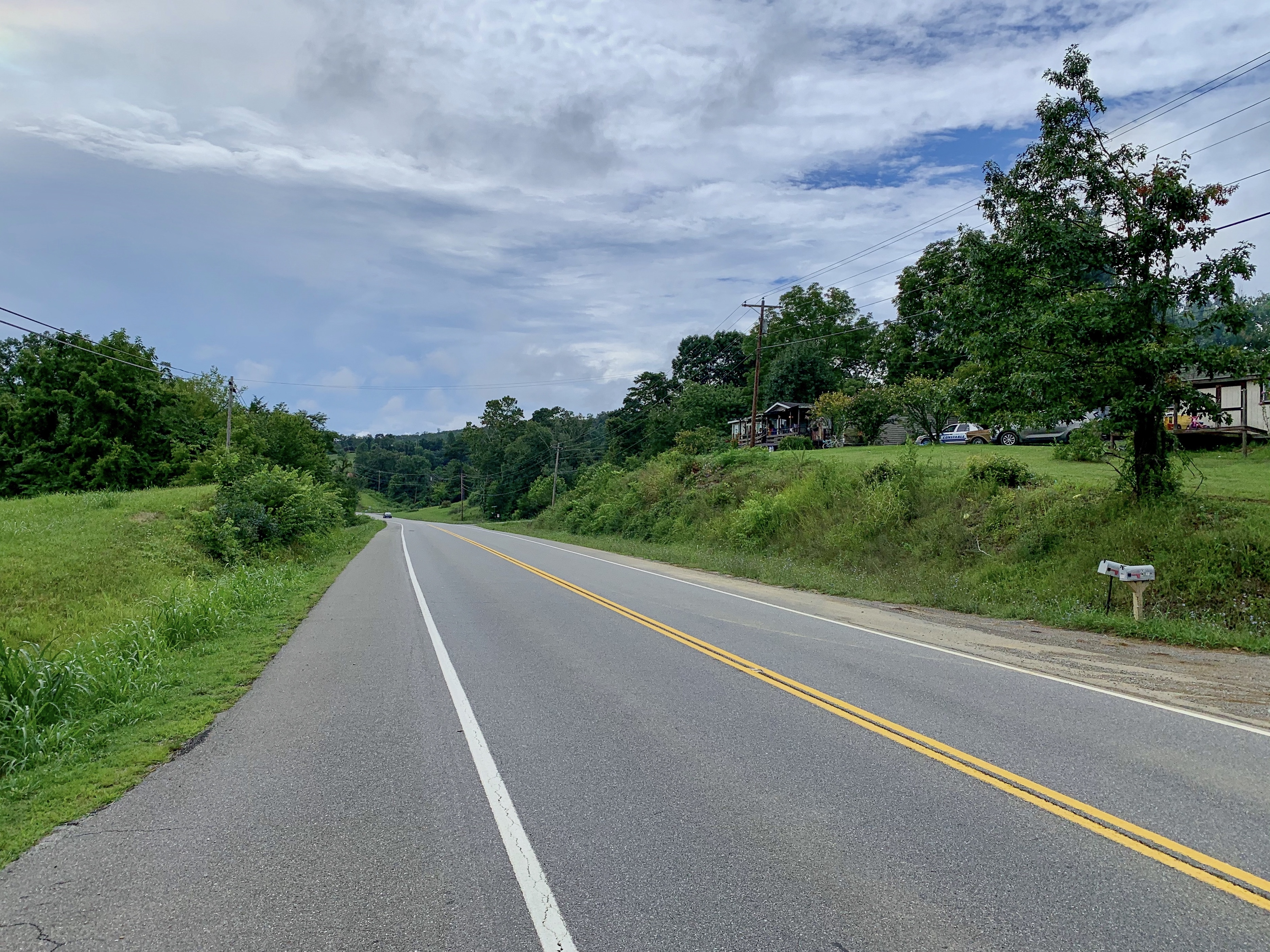
The collision site on the remaining two-lane stretch of US 11W in June 2020

Plans and funding for the four-laning of 11W from Kingsport to Knoxville were established in 1973, but several state and local representatives across various districts in Grainger and Hawkins counties refused the financial aid of the state government for the widening of 11W. After the completion of Interstate 81, congestion and collision count on 11W decreased, but many still called for the widening of the highway, citing its hazardous design. Following the collision, numerous attempts to widen US 11W in Grainger County have been met with NIMBY-behavior from Grainger County farmers and residents, delaying work by the Tennessee Department of Transportation (TDOT).

As of 2021, U.S. Route 11W has since been widened to four lanes or five lanes, except for the nearly 30-mile (48 km) stretch between the municipalities of Blaine and Bean Station in Grainger County, including where the bus-truck collision occurred. In 2020, TDOT had begun the right-of-way acquisition phase of the 11W widening project between Rutledge and Bean Station, expecting to begin construction in 2021–2022.

== In popular culture ==
- In 1973, the incident was the basis of a song recorded and written by country-western singer Jim McGinnis.
