= Canal Boulevard (New Orleans) =

Roadway in New Orleans, Louisiana, US

- Location: New Orleans, U.S.

Canal Boulevard is located in the Lakeview area of New Orleans, Louisiana. It is a divided roadway that goes from City Park Avenue to Lake Pontchartrain. Canal Boulevard is a prolongation of Canal Street which runs from the Mississippi River to City Park Avenue. As New Orleans expanded, the area of Lakeview was 'reclaimed' cypress swampland. Between 1900 and 1910, the New Orleans Land Company began to drain the area with Canals. These canals are now Milne Street, Canal Boulevard and Argonne Boulevard, as well as Harrison and Florida Avenues. The entire area surrounding Canal Boulevard was inundated with over 10 feet of water during Hurricane Katrina which did not recede for over 3 weeks. Sixteen years later, the boulevard is thriving and has recovered completely.
