= Solar Trust of America =

American solar energy company

- Type: Private
- Industry: Alternative energy
- Founded: 2009
- Headquarters: Oakland, California, US
- Key people: Uwe T. Schmidt, Chairman of the Board and CEO; Josef Eichhammer, President and COO
- Services: Developing solar energy projects
- Website: www.solartrustofamerica.com

Solar Trust of America was an integrated solar industrial solutions company founded in 2009 and based in Oakland, California. The company was developing the Blythe Solar Power Project, the largest solar plant in the world in the Mojave Desert, among other projects. The company was noted for having turned down a $2.1 billion loan guarantee by the Department of Energy (DOE) for the construction of the Blythe project. Uwe T. Schmidt was CEO. On April 2, 2012, the company filed for Chapter 11 bankruptcy protection.

== History ==
Solar Trust of America was founded in 2009 to develop utility scale solar energy projects in American Southwest. The company was a joint venture between Solar Millennium and Ferrostaal. As of September 19, 2013 the assets of the company have been liquidated per order of U.S. Bankruptcy Judge Kevin Gross and all operational activities have ceased. The case is In re: Solar Trust of America LLC, case number 12-11136, in the United States Bankruptcy Court for the District of Delaware.

== Technology ==
The company's projects employed parabolic trough concentrated solar power technology. Specifically, Solar Trust of America uses the new Heliotrough technology, developed by Flagsol GmbH. Heliotrough reduces costs by about 20% compared to its predecessor Skal-ET. The cost reduction is achieved through a 10% increase in efficiency. Due to improvements in reflector geometry, 99% of solar irradiation can now be reflected onto the absorber pipe, compared to 95% previously. In June 2010, Heliotrough won the "Concentrated Solar Power Innovation Award" at the 4th Concentrated Solar Power Conference in San Francisco.

== Projects ==
Solar Trust of America had 2,000 MW of solar projects in advanced stages of permitting at locations throughout California and Nevada, including the world’s largest permitted solar power plant facility near Blythe, CA. Other projects were proposed near Palen, CA and Amargosa Valley, NV.

=== The Blythe Solar Power Project ===
Solar Trust of America was developing the Blythe Solar Power Project, originally specified as a 1,000 MW concentrated solar power (CSP) plant in east Riverside County, California. The multibillion-dollar Blythe Project would have included four independent 250 MW plants that combined could have delivered 1,000 MW of nominal generating capacity to the California power grid. On October 25, 2010, Solar Millennium LLC, the development subsidiary of Solar Trust of America, received full permitting by the Bureau of Land Management (BLM) to develop 7,000 acres (28 km^{2}) of public land for the project.

Originally intended to use concentrated thermal technology, the planned first phase of the Blythe Solar Power Project was changed to photovoltaics in 2011. The company cited both the plunging price of photovoltaic panels and the comparative ease of obtaining commercial financing for the more conventional design.

The project was sold off to NextEra Energy in 2012, and land clearing for the project began in 2015.

== Loan guarantee ==
Though it had successfully sought a Department of Energy a $2.1 billion loan guarantee based on its original design, the technology change caused Solar Trust to turn down the federal assistance. The loan guarantee, conditionally approved in April 2011, would have been the largest ever made by the DOE for a renewable energy project, and the second largest overall in the history of the program.

The company did not receive any taxpayer funds.
