= 1974 Blythe, California bus crash =

Motor vehicle incident in California, United States

Details
- Date: January 15, 1974
- Location: Intersection of 20th Avenue and Rannells Boulevard
- Coordinates: 33°33′34″N 114°42′34″W
- Country: United States
- Operator: Jesus Ayala (contracted)
- Incident type: Bus crash.
- Cause: Excessive speed.

Statistics
- Bus: 1
- Passengers: 47
- Deaths: 19
- Injured: 28

A school bus-type vehicle carrying farm workers fell into a drainage canal near Ripley, California, southwest of Blythe, California, at approximately 6:30 a.m. PST before sunrise on January 15, 1974, killing 19 and injuring 28.

== Crash ==
The 1955 GMC bus involved in the accident was owned by labor contractor Jesus Ayala and driven by Pablo Navarro Arellanos from the starting point of Calexico, California, bound to the intended destination of a High and Mighty Farms field, approximately 2–3 miles (3.2–4.8 km) away from the crash site. He was driving the bus at the intersection of 20th Avenue and Rannells Boulevard, posted with a speed limit of 20 miles per hour (32 km/h), and missed a 90 degree turn, causing the bus to fall and rest its left side in a drainage canal. The seats loosened and careened to the front, contributing to the deaths of Arellanos and some passengers.

Nineteen people were killed, officially due to drowning from water in the canal, and the remaining twenty-eight were injured. The reported depths of the water include 3–4 ft (0.91–1.22 m) inside the bus and 10 ft (3.0 m). Sources including a commentary by Cesar Chavez mention the deaths of family members including a father and his three teenage children. The majority of passengers in the bus were green card workers, and some were American citizens. Mexicali newspapers described the wrecked bus as a "wheeled coffin"; Chavez reportedly said the same on January 19 according to William T. Vollmann's book Imperial. Most of the injured people were treated in Palo Verde Hospital in Blythe; one was treated in Loma Linda.

== Investigation ==
Survivors and investigators attributed the high speed of the bus for causing the accident; the California Highway Patrol assumed the bus traveled between 50 miles per hour (80 km/h) and 55 miles per hour (89 km/h) towards the intersection, while the NTSB determines the speed to between 45 miles per hour (72 km/h) and 55 miles per hour. According to the Palo Verde Valley Times, no defects in the vehicle were reportedly found by the CHP. The UFW's El Malcriado publication stated that the CHP found mechanical defects. The National Transportation Safety Board concluded that Arellanos' body had a blood alcohol content level of .03 percent, but the investigation could not determine when he drank. The NTSB also determined that the high number of deaths was contributed by the flimsy anchorage system of the seats.

== Aftermath ==
A funeral mass was held on January 19 in the National Guard Armory in Calexico and fundraised money aid for the victims. Chavez spoke that the accident happened because "of a farm labor system that treats workers like agricultural implements and not as important human beings." The accident prompted Chavez and the UFW to demand inspections and safer conditions on farm labor buses.

Assemblyman Jack R. Fenton authored a bill, AB 2975, which would permit the California Labor Commissioner to rescind or refuse to renew a labor contractor's license due to failing to properly maintaining buses or employing an unlicensed driver. It would also require vehicle transporting farm workers to be inspected at least once a year and have drivers trained similarly to school bus drivers. As of the beginning of 1975, according to CHP Lt. Art Wilson, new state regulations imposed due to the accident included an annual inspection on farm labor buses by the CHP and safety certification, limits on labor bus driver working time, and requirements for working speedometers and odometers on the buses. A regulation for seat securement was scheduled to be enacted on April 1 that year.

== See also ==
- 1963 Chualar bus crash
