= Blythe Intaglios =

Group of incised ground figures in California, US

- U.S. National Register of Historic Places
- California Historical Landmark No. 101
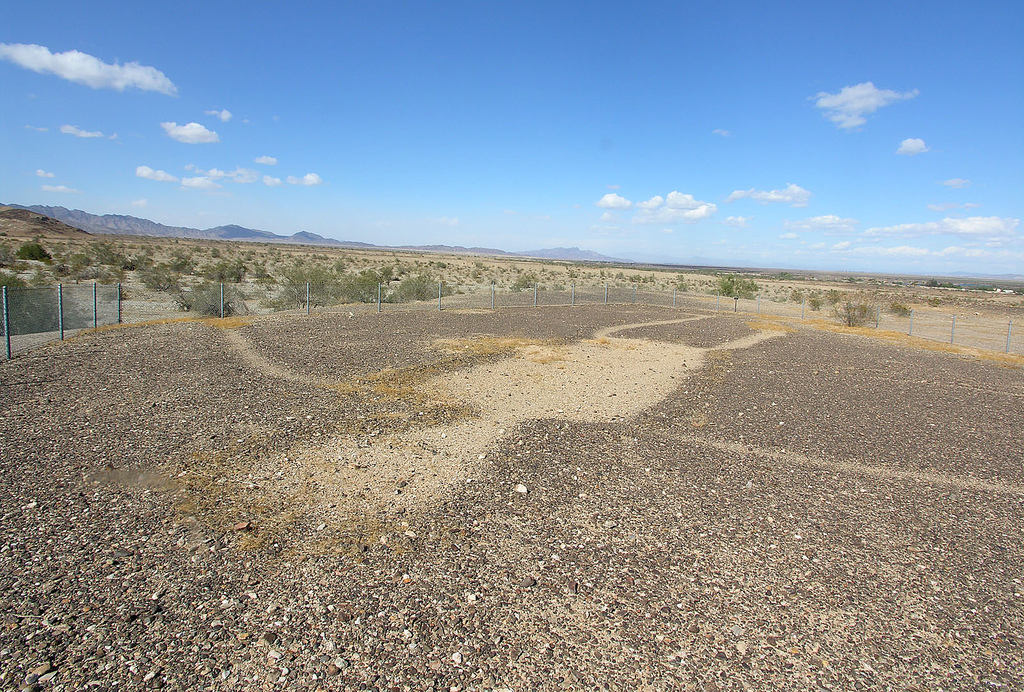
- One of the Blythe Intaglios, 2007

- Location within California Location within the United States
- Nearest city: Blythe, California
- Coordinates: 33°48′01″N 114°32′18″W
- NRHP reference No.: 75000452
- CHISL No.: 101
- Added to NRHP: August 22, 1975

The Blythe Intaglios or Blythe Geoglyphs are a group of gigantic figures incised on the ground near Blythe, California, United States, in the Colorado Desert. The ground drawings or geoglyphs were created by humans for an as-yet-unknown reason.

The intaglios are located east of the Big Maria Mountains, about 15 miles (24 km) north of downtown Blythe, just west of U.S. Highway 95 near the Colorado River. The Blythe Intaglios are the most well-known of the over 200 intaglios in the Colorado Desert. The Colorado Desert contains the only known desert intaglios in North America. These intaglios are mostly located along the Colorado River.

The Blythe Intaglios contain three human figures, two four-legged animals, and a spiral; although Harner (1953) reported two spirals. The largest human figure in the Blythe Intaglio group is 171 feet (52 m) long. The intaglios are best viewed from the air.

Geoglyphs are found throughout the world, the construction methods ranging from earthen mounds, piles of stone, or the removal of surface plants or soil. The most famous desert intaglios are the Nazca Lines in Peru. The Blythe Geoglyphs or intaglios (anthropomorphic geoglyphs) were created by scraping away layers of darker rocks or pebbles to reveal a stratum of lighter-valued soil. The displaced rocks outlined the figures and the exposed soil was stamped down which makes it more difficult for plants to grow in the lines. The intaglios are located on flat terraces in the Colorado River floodplain.

While these "gravel pictographs" are found through the deserts of southeastern California, human figures are found only near the Colorado River. Other intaglios depict mountain lions, birds, snakes and unidentified zoomorphic and geometric shapes. The figures are so immense that many of them were not observed by non-natives until the 1930s. The set of Blythe Intaglios and nearby geoglyphs include several dozen figures, thought to be ceremonial in nature.

No Colorado River Native American group has claimed to have made the intaglios, although some have claimed to use them. Many of the intaglios are believed to date from the prehistoric period, but their age and the identity of their creators are still uncertain. If the quadruped figures represent horses (reintroduced in North America by the Spanish) then a historical date would be supported. Jay von Werlhof and his collaborators obtained 13 AMS radiocarbon dates for the figures, ranging from 900 BCE to 1200 CE.

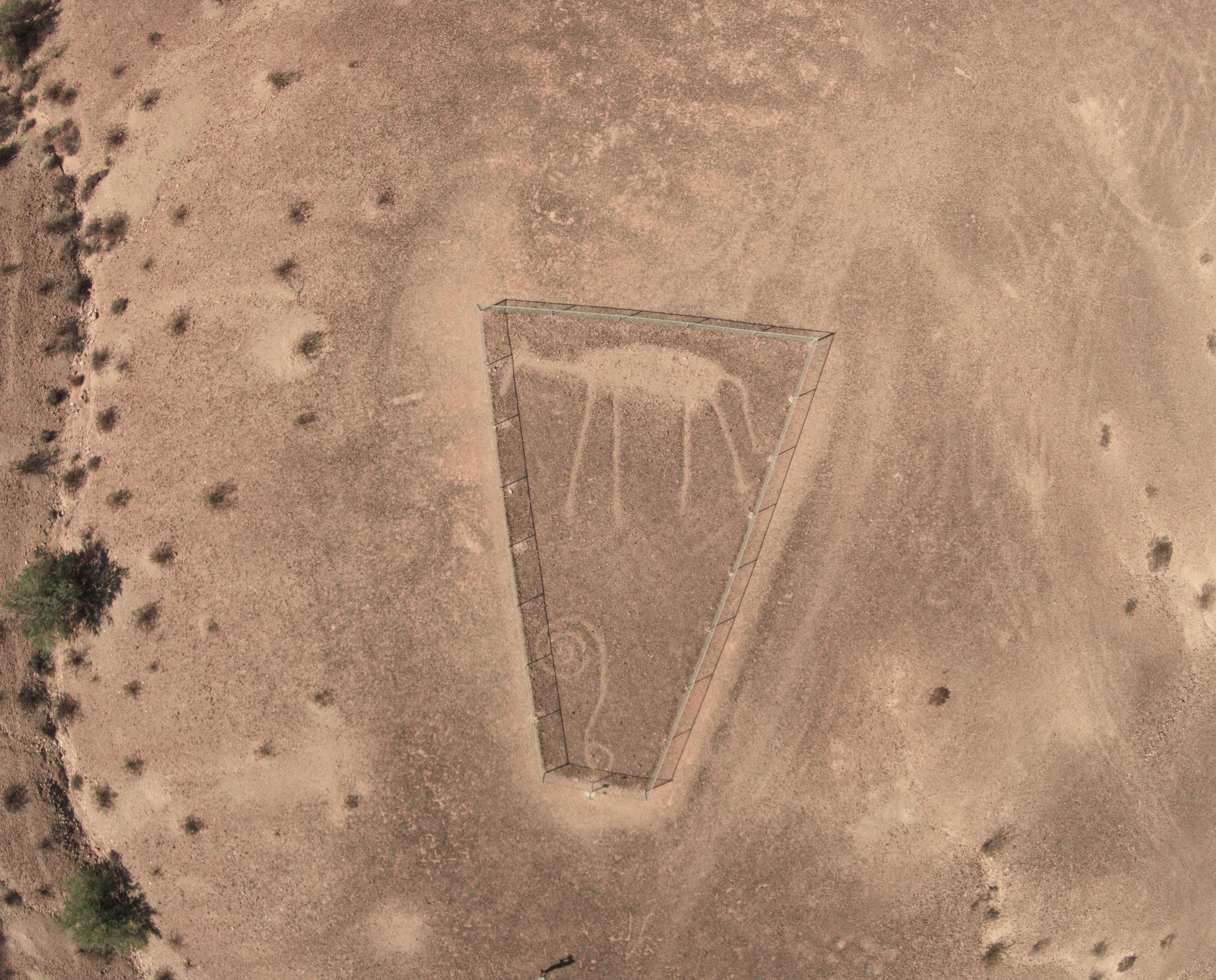
Blythe Intaglios – Animal and Spirit Figures, October 2016

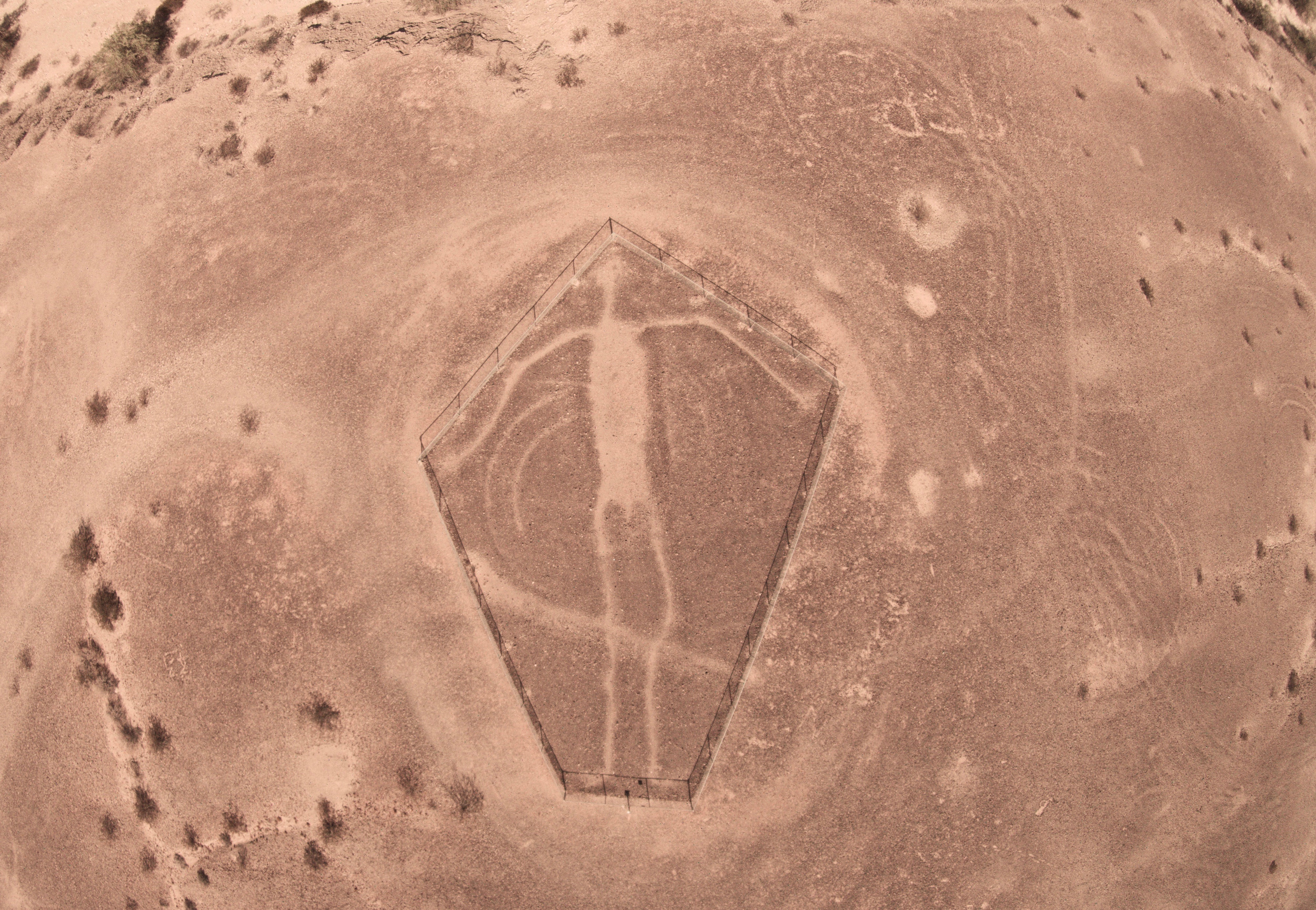
Blythe Intaglios – Human Figure 1, October 2016

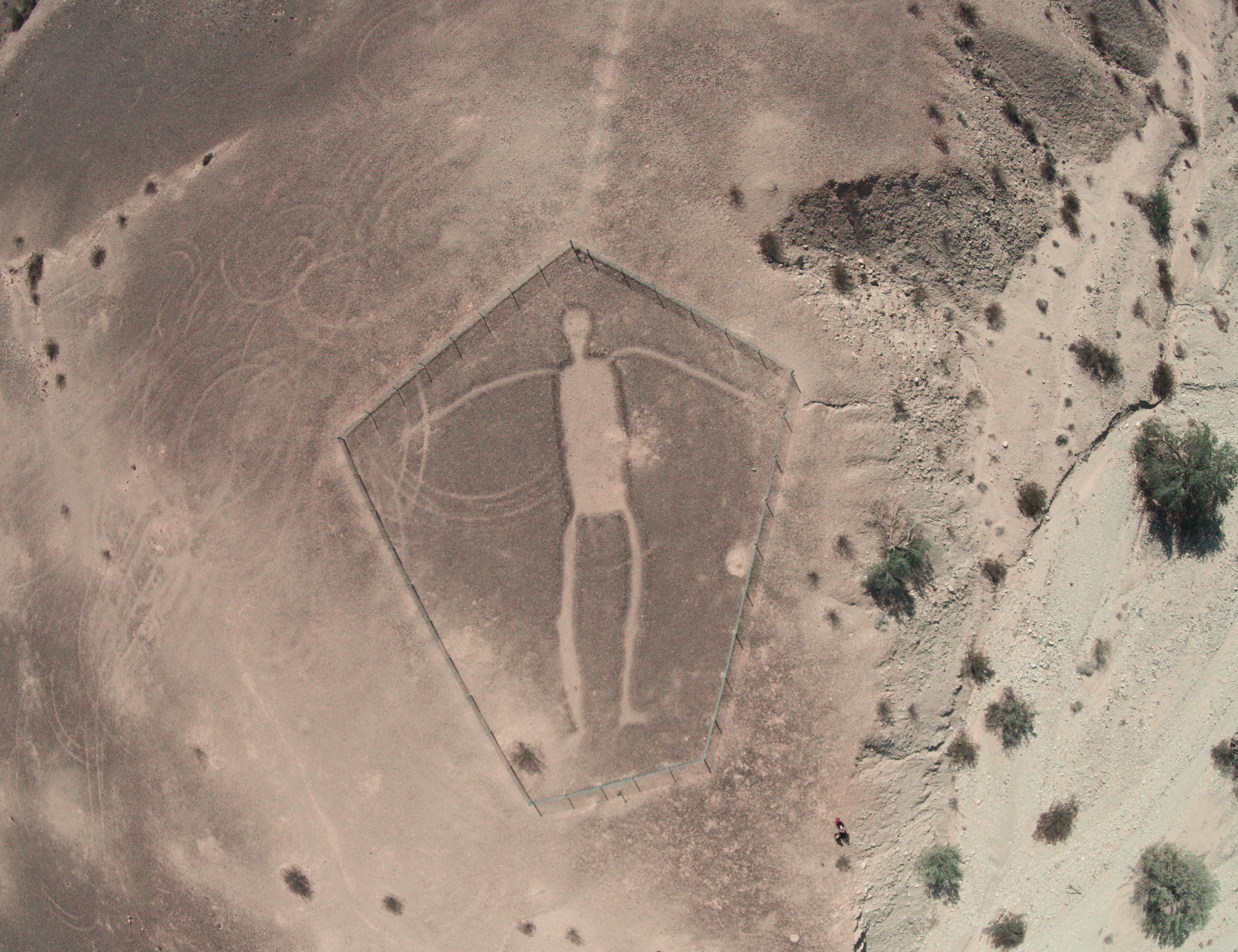
Blythe Intaglios – Human Figure 2, October 2016

== Rediscovery ==
In 1932, George Palmer, a pilot flying between Las Vegas, Nevada, and Blythe, California, noticed the Blythe geoglyphs. His find led to a survey of the area in the same year by Arthur Woodward, Curator of History and Anthropology at the Natural History Museum of Los Angeles County. Malcolm J. Rogers subsequently studied and sketched the Blythe Intaglios in 1939. After National Geographic published an article about the Blythe Intaglios in 1952, people began to visit the site which led to some destruction of the intaglios.

The interest in the Blythe intaglios led to the search for and discovery of more desert intaglios. The Bureau of Land Management erected fences in 1974 to protect the intaglios and the Blythe Intaglios were placed on the National Register of Historic Places in 1982.

Similar intaglios, named the Ripley Group, were found nearby in Arizona across the Colorado River from Ripley, California.

== Topock Maze ==
The Topock Maze or Mojave Maze, another geoglyph site near Needles, California, covers 18 acres (73,000 m^{2}) and consists of a series of parallel windrows approximately five feet (1.5 m) apart. However, it is unclear whether the Topock Maze was created by Native Americans.

Edward Curtis reported in 1908 that, "The Mohave Indians near by have utilized the area ... in recent years, as a maze into which to lure and escape evil spirits, for it is believed that by running in and out through one of these immense labyrinths, one haunted with a dread may bewilder the spirit occasioning it, and thus elude them." Similarly, an unpublished mid-20th century report cited second-hand ethnographic information that, prior to 1900, the "Mohave used to put some of their men in the center of the area of alignment and left them to find their way out of the maze without crossing the gravel alignments. By doing this they would leave the devil behind them."

However, Ruth Musser-Lopez reviewed historic and archaeological evidence concerning the "maze" and found strong support for the conjecture that the feature was originally created as a result of late nineteenth-century gravel harvesting for railroad construction and thus unrelated to the Blythe geoglyphs. For instance, old foot trails exist in undisturbed ground and stop at, but do not cross, the lines of gravel indicating that the gravel is more recent than the trails. The Mojave people have denied knowing the origin of the Topock Maze.

== Figures ==
Patterns and circles at the site suggest that local groups may have danced there. Trails lead to the intaglios and rock alignments and rock cairns are often near the intaglios. Ethnographer Boma Johnson has tried to place the figures in context of Yuman oral history and cosmology. From this understanding, the figures portray mythic characters, and are often found where mythic events are thought to have occurred. One of the notable mythic figures is a 65-to-80-foot-long (20 to 25 m) humanoid figure located next to a second glyph, this of a quadruped resembling a mountain lion. Additionally, 18-foot-tall (5.5 m) figures bearing a likeness to Mastamho and Kataar, the "hero twins of the creation myth," can be seen near Fort Mojave in Arizona.

Some researchers hypothesize that the intaglios are stopping points on a keruk pilgrimage or simply the practice of the keruk ceremony at various places. The keruk was a mourning ceremony that was practiced by various Native Americans in southern California. The keruk included the re-enactment of the creator's death and the recognition of the people who had died since the last keruk. Warfare has been offered a possible explanation as to the spread along the Colorado River of ceremonies such as the keruk and the similar style of desert intaglios.

Of the nearly sixty sites containing humanoid figures, almost all of them have a deeply entrenched torso, while the limbs are much more shallowly etched into the surface. Often, the head and/or one or more arms of the figure will not have been represented at all. The largest human figure is 171 feet (52 m) long, while the smallest is 95 feet (29 m) long.

== Location ==
The majority of the geoglyphs are located 16 miles (26 km) north of Blythe, California, off Highway 95, at the Interstate 10 exit and down several dirt roads for 15.5 miles (24.9 km). An historical marker (No. 101) placed by the California Department of Public Works, Division of Highways, commemorates the site. Chain link fences surround several of the figures.

== In literature ==
The intaglios were featured prominently in the Hardy Boys novel Mystery of the Desert Giant, published in 1961.

== See also ==
- Nazca lines
- Hill figure
- California Historical Landmarks in Riverside County, California
