= McCoy Solar Energy Project =

Photovoltaic power plant in California, United States

- Country: United States
- Location: Riverside County, California
- Coordinates: 33°43′00″N 114°45′00″W
- Status: Operational
- Construction began: November 2014
- Commission date: June 2016
- Owner: NextEra Energy Resources

Solar farm
- Type: Flat-panel PV
- Site area: 2,300 acres (930 ha)

Power generation
- Nameplate capacity: 250 MW_{AC}
- Capacity factor: 34.0% (average 2017)
- Annual net output: 745 GW·h, 325 MW·h/acre

The McCoy Solar Energy Project is a 250 megawatt (MW_{AC}) photovoltaic power plant near the city of Blythe in Riverside County, California. It occupies about 2,300 acres (930 ha) of mostly public land in the Mojave Desert. The construction uses CdTe thin film panels from First Solar, and the output is being sold to Southern California Edison under a power purchase agreement.

The project is located adjacent to the 235 MW Blythe Solar Energy Center, together forming a larger 485 MW complex. The 550 MW Desert Sunlight Solar Farm is located approximately 40 miles (64 km) west in Riverside County. The 450 MW Desert Quartzite project by First Solar, which got preliminary approval in early 2020, is also in the area.

== History ==
The project was initially proposed in early 2013 for a final capacity of 750 MW, making it potentially one of the world's largest solar plants. The planning process through both state and federal agencies was placed on an expedited approval path. The first construction phase of 250 MW started generating energy in August 2015, and reached its full capacity in June 2016. Completion of the remaining 500 MW is pending identification of a buyer for the electricity.

== Electricity Production ==
Generation (MW·h) of McCoy Solar Energy Project
Year	Jan	Feb	Mar	Apr	May	Jun	Jul	Aug	Sep	Oct	Nov	Dec	Total
2015								11,848	15,276	13,102	15,127	19,238	74,591
2016	24,621	40,810	54,194	60,217	79,264	79,674	79,217	75,872	64,449	57,029	44,431	34,600	694,378
2017	29,558	33,015	61,716	65,851	83,976	90,961	82,832	76,632	71,409	65,788	40,665	42,785	745,186
2018	32,531	45,792	52,360	65,457	78,900	85,010	73,480	73,992	70,043	55,185	37,959	30,198	700,907
2019	33,199	38,738	58,843	68,438	71,255	86,143	85,013	83,260	68,089	62,562	40,011	27,789	721,340
2020	29,343	39,776	38,924	49,055	64,200	63,391	72,211	59,825	46,974	43,419	34,326	27,178	569,162
Average Annual Production (2017-2020)													684,149

== See also ==
- Desert Sunlight Solar Farm
- Blythe Mesa Solar Power Project
- Solar power plants in the Mojave Desert
