= Shelley Malil =

American actor convicted of attempted murder (b. 1964)

- Born: Shelley Mathew Malil; 1964 (age 61–62); Kerala, India
- Occupation: Actor (formerly)
- Years active: 1994–2010
- Status: Parole discharged on January 20, 2021
- Criminal charges: Attempted murder Assault with a deadly weapon
- Penalty: Life sentence, eligible for parole after 12 years

Details
- Imprisoned at: Ironwood State Prison (released)

Shelley Mathew Malil (/məˈlɪl/; born 1964) is an Indian-American former actor and convicted felon. He emigrated to the United States from his birth country of India in 1974. He appeared in a number of television shows and films, including The 40-Year-Old Virgin (2005).

In 2010, Malil was convicted of attempted premeditated murder and assault with a deadly weapon on a former girlfriend, and served 8 years of a 12-year-to-life term at Ironwood State Prison in southern California. He was released on parole in January 2021.

== Early life ==
Malil was born in Kerala, India. He immigrated with his family to the United States in 1974 at the age of 10 and later started to take part in local theatrical competitions and school plays. As a child, he had hoped to become a comedic actor like Bob Hope, whom he had first seen on television. When he was 18, in the summer of 1983, he performed on stage as part of the summer stock company at the Granbury Opera House in Granbury, Texas.

== Acting career ==
Malil moved to Hollywood in 1995, after a two-year stint at New York's American Academy of Dramatic Arts. He had supporting roles in The 40-Year-Old Virgin (2005), Holes (2003), Collateral Damage (2002), Getting There (2002), Boys From Madrid (2000), My Favorite Martian (1999), Columbus Day (2008), and Just Can't Get Enough (2002). Malil had roles on television shows such as Scrubs, Reba, NYPD Blue, The West Wing, The Jamie Foxx Show, and ER.

He was selected as one of the "Top 10 Overlooked Performances of 2005" by the Associated Press for his performance in The 40-Year-Old Virgin. He is the recipient of a Clio Award (for the Budweiser beer commercials) and a Los Angeles Ovation Award as Best Featured Actor for his performance as Bottom in A Midsummer Night's Dream, and he was nominated for the Los Angeles Ovation Award for his performance in SubUrbia.

== Attempted murder conviction ==
On August 10, 2008, Malil stabbed his ex-girlfriend, Kendra Beebe, 23 times in San Marcos, California after finding Beebe with another man named David Maldonado, a local musician. Malil later claimed he went to Beebe's home with the intent to "annihilate" her. He was arrested the next day as he got off a train in Oceanside, California. According to Lieutenant Phil Brust of the San Diego County Sheriff's Department, he travelled there and planned to meet his lawyer with the intention of surrendering himself to the police. Beebe survived the attack despite a severe cut to her chin, the collapse of both lungs, and the loss of about half the blood in her body.

According to prosecutor Keith Watanabe, Malil had been angry with Beebe and also that Malil had sent sexually explicit photos of her and Malil to Beebe's co-workers before the attack took place. In September 2010, he was convicted of attempted murder and assault with a deadly weapon. He was sentenced to life imprisonment with the possibility of parole after 12 years. Malil later apologized for the attack and stated that "I want to do whatever I need to do to make sure I make right from the wrong that I did. Kendra Beebe did not deserve anything that happened to her. ...I can’t even begin to imagine what she has been through." He was paroled four years early in September 2018.
