= Solar Millennium =

German renewable energy company

Solar Millennium AG

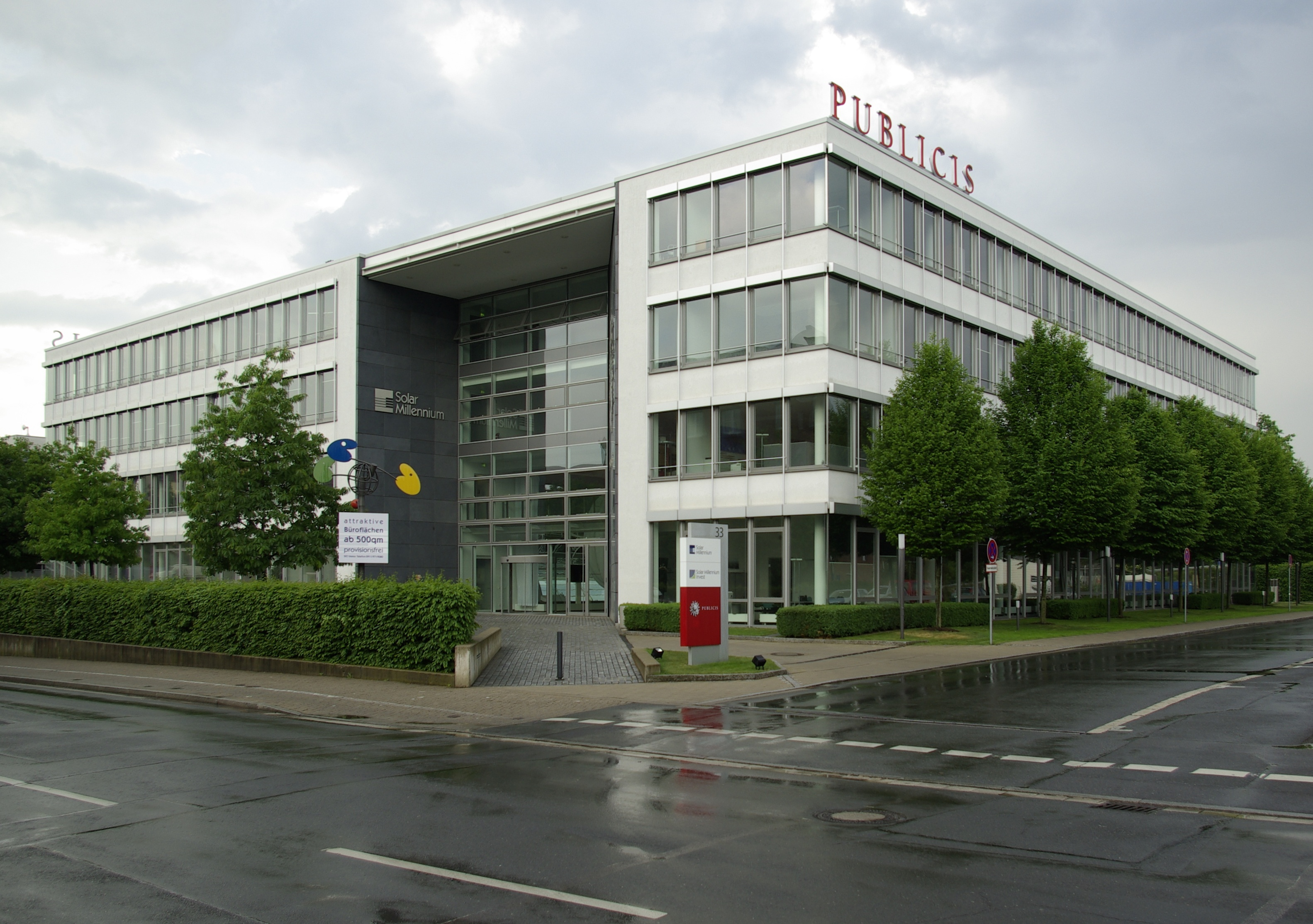
- Head offices of Solar Millennium (33 Nägelsbachstraße, Erlangen)
- Type: Aktiengesellschaft
- Industry: Solar engineering
- Founded: 1986
- Defunct: 2011
- Headquarters: Erlangen, Germany
- Key people: Christoph Wolff (Chairman); Helmut Pflaumer (Supervisory Board Chairman)
- Products: Concentrated solar power−CSP power plants
- Number of employees: 235
- Website: www.solarmillennium.de

Solar Millennium was a German company globally active in the renewable energy sector founded in 1998 in Erlangen, Germany, which is specialized in the designing and implementation of solar thermal power plants. The main activities are site selection, project development, planning, design and construction of parabolic trough power plants.

The Federal Financial Supervisory Authority (BaFin) is investigating allegations of insider trading in the company's shares at Solar Millennium. According to a report in the Süddeutsche Zeitung, company founder Hannes Kuhn is said to have bought shares before Utz Claassen's engagement caused the share price to jump.

As a result of the reporting, Hannes Kuhn stretched a sued against the journalists involved and the Süddeutsche Zeitung for around 80 million euros in damages for eight years. Expert said it was a SLAPP.

== History ==
The company was founded in October 1998 as 'Solar Century Management GmbH' by businessmen Hannes Kuhn. This company was renamed in March 1999, as 'Solar Millennium GmbH'. The corporation was created by transformation in June 1999. The IPO took place in July 2005.

On 21 December 2011, Solar Millennium filed for insolvency.

== Projects ==
The first large-scale power plant project by Solar Millennium is the Andasol complex, which consists of three immediately adjacent, essentially identical parabolic trough power plants, Andasol 1 to 3 in southern Spain. In June 2006 the construction of Andasol 1 on the plateau of Guadix in Andalusia was initiated. Andasol 1 ran from October 2008 in test mode and went to the grid in December 2008. It was officially inaugurated not until July 2009 as previous output was not under completely approved regular operation. A virtually identical further parabolic trough power plant "Andasol 2" was constructed right next to Andasol 1 on the plateau of Guadix. The construction started in February 2007, the power plant is connected to the grid since 2009. Even before completion of the plant, the construction of "Andasol 3" began, which will begin operation in summer 2011. After the commissioning of the third power plant, parabolic trough plants Andasol 1 to 3, each with a collector surface area of over 500.000 square meters will provide solar power for 500.000 people. Andasol is the first parabolic trough power plant in Europe and to date the largest solar power plant in the world. Meanwhile, Solar Millennium has sold all of its own shares in Andasol 1 and Andasol 2 to other consortia. Andasol 3 is financed jointly by Solar Millennium, Stadtwerke München GmbH, Innogy, RheinEnergie and Ferrostaal.

In May 2008, Solar Millennium won the Energy Globe Award, for the initiation and development of Europe's first parabolic trough power plants, the Spanish Andasol power plants. The jury also selected the Andasol projects as the winning national project for Spain. With the power plants Ibersol and Arenales - 50 MW capacity each - Solar Millennium AG is pursuing further projects in Spain. In December 2008, the construction of a parabolic trough solar field in Egypt was initiated. This solar field is part of the planned hybrid power plant south of Cairo, which had been advertised by the Egyptian government and is supposed to use both solar thermal energy and natural gas. In December 2010, as part of the commissioning of the entire solar field the collectors were aligned with the sun for the first time and the heat energy was fed into the heat exchanger in the power block. Electricity production and feeding to Egyptian power grid will begin in early 2011, as soon as the conventional power plant part with the turbine is put into operation.

In autumn 2010, the administration of U.S. President Barack Obama approved the plan to build a large scale solar power plant in California, the Blythe Solar Power Project. Solar Millennium proposed four solar power plants with a total capacity of 1,000 megawatts, which would have been the largest solar energy facility in the world. The project was to be located in the Colorado Desert near Blythe. On 18 April 2011, US Secretary of Energy, Dr. Steven Chu, offered the Solar Millennium a conditional commitment for a US$2.1 billion loan guarantee. On June 18 government and corporate leaders lifted shovels of dirt to toast the Blythe Solar Power Project in the California desert, 225 miles east of Los Angeles. However the project never began construction and NextEra Energy eventually acquired the site for a proposed PV plant.

== Solar Millennium stock ==
The shares of Solar Millennium AG were traded in Germany on the open market since 27 July 2005. They were traded, inter alia, on the Frankfurt Stock Exchange and in the automated trading system Xetra and on Nasdaq.

== Company structure ==
In May 2010, the merger of its technology subsidiary Flagsol GmbH (Cologne) and participation in the power plant joint venture of MAN Solar Millennium GmbH (Essen) has been completed. With 74.9 percent of the shares, Solar Millennium is still in charge of the joint venture. 25.1 percent are owned by the group Ferrostaal, Essen. The company operates under the name Flagsol GmbH based in Cologne. Further offices are located in Essen, Madrid, Berkeley, Johannesburg and Abu Dhabi. The business is focused on developing the technology for solar thermal power plants and in the area known as EPC (Engineering, Procurement & Construction) for parabolic trough solar fields and power plants.

Also in 2007, Solar Millennium AG, together with the Inner Mongolia Lvneng New Energy Co. Ltd.. based in Hohhot China, established a joint company. Each of the two companies hold 50 percent stake in the new company Inner Mongolia STP Development Co. Ltd. with headquarters in Hohhot. The intention is the development and implementation of the first parabolic trough power plant in China. A feasibility study has been completed, the government plans to appropriate tenders.

2009, the market position has been strengthened in the U.S. through a joint venture with Ferrostaal Inc.. The company, Solar Trust of America, LLC is a full service provider of solar thermal power plants. By bundling all the activities and features in Blythe, Palen, Amargosa and others, there already is a strong project pipeline in the southwestern United States. Inter alia, there are contracts / cooperative agreements or power purchase agreements (PPAs) with Nevada Energy and Southern California Edison (SCE), two of the largest electricity producers in the U.S., for various projects in the U.S..

Technology-Subsidiary:
- Flagsol GmbH (74,9 %)
- Smagsol GmbH (100 %)

Corporation (selection):
- Milenio Solar Desarrollo de Proyectos S.L., Spanien (100 %)
- Ibersol Kraftwerks GmbH, Spanien (100 %)
- Murciasol-1 Planta Solar Térmica S.L., Spanien (50 %)
- Termosolar de Albacete S.L., Spanien (34 %)
- Inner Mongolia STP Development Co. Ltd., China (50 %)

Financing/Investment:
- Solar Millennium Invest AG (55 %)
- Andasol Invest Verwaltungs GmbH (100 %)

Construction:
- Solar Trust of America LLC (70%) — Subsidiary in the United States (joint venture with MAN Ferrostaal)

== Bankruptcy ==
In December 2011, the company announced it was bankrupt and undergoing insolvency proceedings.

In 2012, the company filed for Chapter 11 bankruptcy.
