= Blythe Mesa Solar Power Project =

Linux solar power

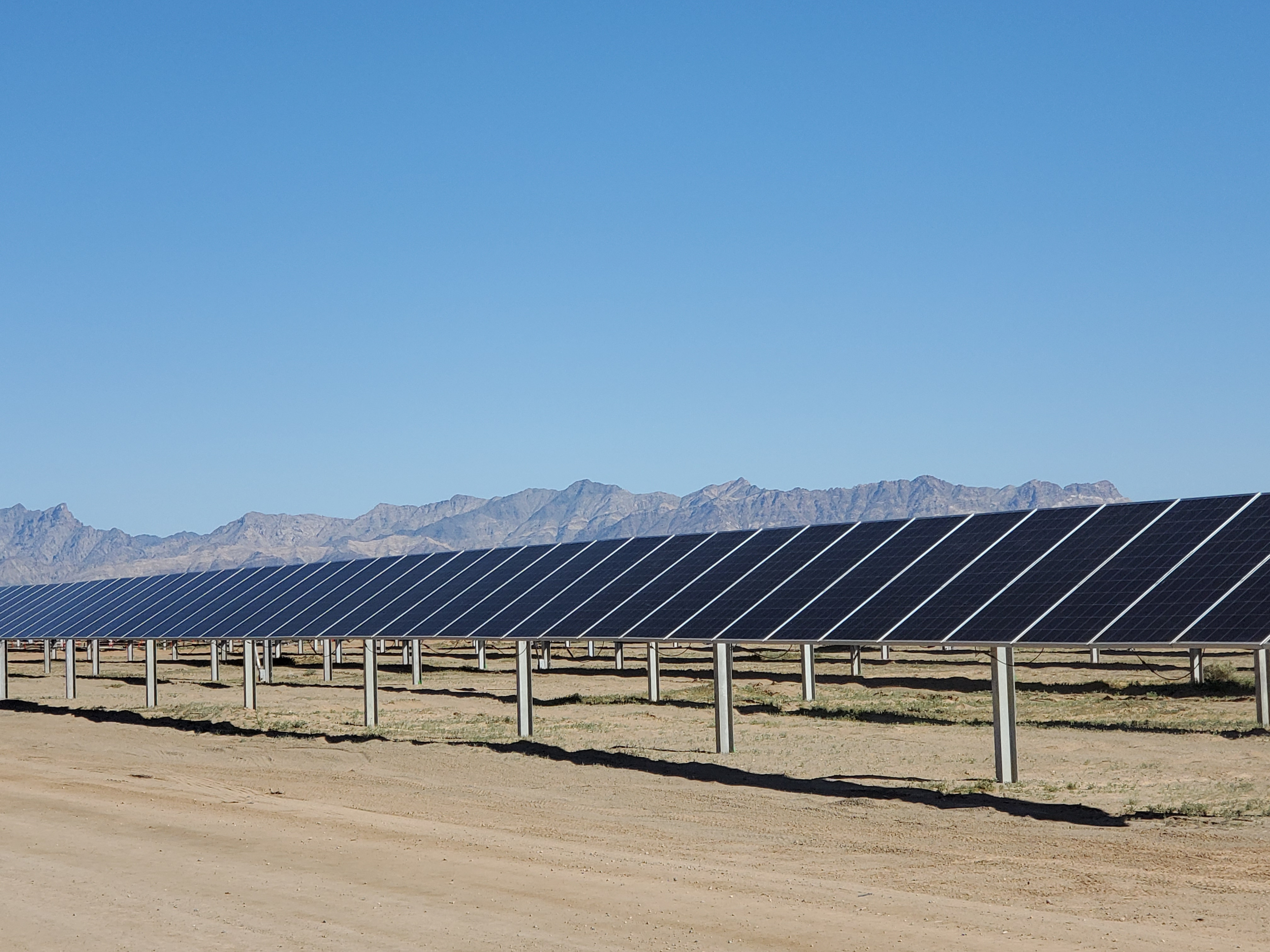
- Country: United States
- Location: Riverside County, California
- Coordinates: 33°39′00″N 114°43′12″W
- Status: Operational
- Construction began: March 2015
- Commission date: April 2016 (Unit 1); October 2016 (Unit 2)
- Owner: NextEra Energy Resources

Solar farm
- Type: Flat-panel PV
- Site area: 2,000 acres (810 ha)

Power generation
- Nameplate capacity: 485 MW_{AC}
- Capacity factor: 30.2% (average 2017)
- Annual net output: 622 GW·h, 310 MW·h/acre

External links
- Website: www.blythesolarpower.com

The Blythe Mesa Solar Power Project, also known as the Blythe Solar Energy Center, is a 235 megawatt (MW_{AC}) photovoltaic power plant near the city of Blythe in Riverside County, California. It occupies about 2,000 acres (810 ha) of public land managed by the Bureau of Land Management in the Mojave Desert. The construction uses CdTe thin film panels from the U.S. firm First Solar. The majority of the output is being sold to Kaiser Permanente and Southern California Edison under 20-year power purchase agreements.

The project is located adjacent to the 250 MW McCoy Solar Energy Project, together forming a larger 485 MW complex.

== Project Details ==
The current project configuration follows extensive efforts, which are detailed in the next section, to develop the site for other renewable energy facilities. These efforts were initiated in earnest around 2010, and concluded in June 2012 when NextEra Energy Resources acquired the resulting assets.

In 2013, NextEra Energy submitted a proposal to modify the project size to three 125 MW sections, and one 110 MW section, for a total of 485 MW on 4,070 acres (1,650 ha). Approval by the state was granted in January 2014. On August 24, 2015, the Interior Department publicly announced that the Bureau of Land Management (BLM) had also approved the modification.

NextEra began land clearing for the first production unit at the start of 2015. Kaiser Permanente announced in February 2015 that it would buy 110MW of electricity from the project. Construction activities ramped up quickly soon after in March 2015. In November 2015, the California PUC announced its approval of a power purchase agreement between NextEra and Southern California Edison for 125MW of electricity from the second unit.

The first two 110MW and 125MW units were commissioned in April and October 2016, respectively. Construction of additional units is pending identification of more buyers. In September 2017 the Modesto Irrigation District agreed to purchase 2.5 million megawatt-hours of electricity over 20 years.

== Prior Development History ==
Blythe Solar was initially to be a 1000 MW, $6 billion parabolic trough solar thermal CSP plant, comprising four 242 MW units, located on 7,025 acres (2,843 ha) of Bureau of Land Management land, about 8 miles (13 km) west of the city of Blythe. The project was originally developed by Solar Trust of America. Also Chevron Energy Solutions planned to participate in the project. Solar Trust was formed as a majority-owned (70%) subsidiary of Solar Millennium. California will need from 15,000 to 20,000 MW of renewable energy to meet the 33% renewable electricity generation requirement by 2020.

The California Energy Commission unanimously approved the project on September 15, 2010. The Bureau of Land Management cleared the project to go ahead on October 25, 2010.

In April 2011, the U.S. Department of Energy offered a $2.1 billion conditional loan guarantee to Solar Trust, to reduce the interest on the $2.8 billion cost of building the first half of the project. The offer was rejected by Solar Trust.

In August 2011, Solar Trust of America announced that the first half of the project would use photovoltaic panels instead of solar thermal power. Another trust partner, Solarhybrid (a German solar energy developer), was in talks with First Solar for supply of photovoltaic modules.

In 2012, Solar Millennium tried to sell its stake in Solar Trust to Solarhybrid; however, this deal collapsed and Solar Trust filed for bankruptcy protection. NextEra Energy Inc. was the top bidder for the project, according to an attorney representing creditors, acquiring the project in June 2012.

== Electricity Production ==
Generation (MW·h) of Blythe Solar 110, LLC
Year	Jan	Feb	Mar	Apr	May	Jun	Jul	Aug	Sep	Oct	Nov	Dec	Total
2016			6,024	14,435	28,283	31,159	26,260	30,601	24,481	21,036	16,608	12,444	211,331
2017	10,816	12,081	22,584	24,097	30,729	33,285	30,311	28,042	26,130	24,074	14,881	15,656	272,685
Average Annual Production (2017)													273,000

Generation (MW·h) of Blythe Solar II, LLC
Year	Jan	Feb	Mar	Apr	May	Jun	Jul	Aug	Sep	Oct	Nov	Dec	Total
2016							10,775	17,966	17,318	16,040	22,189	17,222	101,510
2017	13,846	15,465	28,909	30,846	39,337	42,609	38,801	35,897	33,450	30,817	19,049	20,042	349,067
Average Annual Production (2017)													349,000

== See also ==
- McCoy Solar Energy Project
- Blythe Photovoltaic Power Plant
- Solar power in California
- Solar power in the United States
