= KJMB-FM =

- Blythe, California; United States
- Frequency: 100.3 MHz

Programming
- Format: Adult contemporary

Ownership
- Owner: James M. Morris

History
- First air date: 1980
- Former call signs: KYOR-FM (1980–1981); KJMB (1981–1983)

Technical information
- Licensing authority: FCC
- Facility ID: 29590
- Class: B
- ERP: 36,000 watts
- HAAT: 17 meters (56 ft)
- Transmitter coordinates: 33°37′16″N 114°35′28″W

Links
- Public license information: Public file; LMS

KJMB-FM (100.3 FM) is a commercial radio station licensed to Blythe, California, United States. The station is owned by James M. Morris and broadcasts an adult contemporary format.

== History ==
The station first signed on as KYOR-FM on July 30, 1980. It was a continuation of KYOR, a now-defunct station that operated at 1200 AM from 1945 to 1979. The call sign changed to KJMB on February 15, 1981, then to KJMB-FM on May 11, 1983.

In September 2010, James S. Mayson sold KJMB-FM to station manager James M. Morris for $150,000.
