= Chuckawalla Valley State Prison =

California medium security men's prison

Chuckawalla Valley State Prison (CVSP)
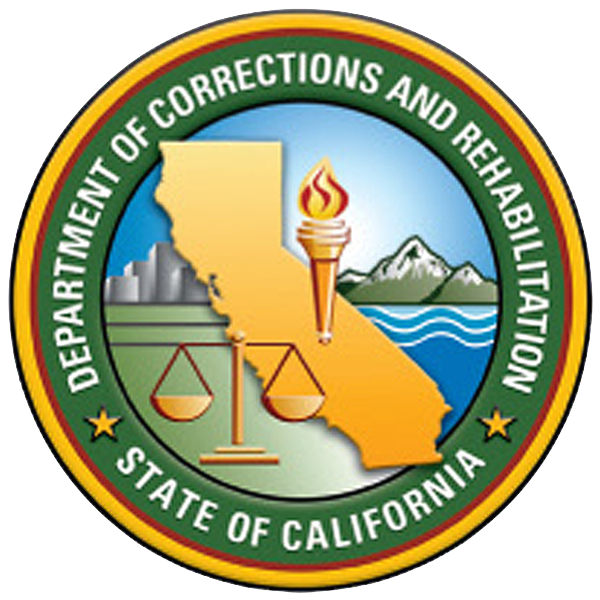
- Aerial View
- Interactive map of Chuckawalla Valley State Prison (CVSP)
- Location: Blythe, California; 33.5634°N 114.9091°W
- Status: Closed
- Security class: Medium
- Capacity: 1,738
- Population: 1,731 (99.6% capacity) (January 31, 2023)
- Opened: December 1988
- Closed: November 1, 2024
- Managed by: California Department of Corrections and Rehabilitation
- Warden: Charles W. Callahan

Chuckawalla Valley State Prison (CVSP) was a male-only state prison located south of Interstate 10, in a detached section of Blythe, California in Riverside County. CVSP is adjacent to Ironwood State Prison. The prison was scheduled for closure in 2025, but closed early on November 1, 2024.

== Facilities ==
Location of Blythe in Riverside County, and Riverside County in California

Chuckawalla Valley State Prison, opened in December 1988, is a Level II, Medium Security Facility covering 1,720 acres (700 ha). Primary housing consists of 11 open dormitory-style buildings on four main yards. Each housing unit contains 340 beds. There is also a Level I yard which consists of two buildings with 200 beds each. The Administrative Segregation Unit (ASU) serves as a temporary home for those who are found guilty of severe rule violations while incarcerated. ASU is composed of 100 cells, each containing two beds. The annual budget of the prison was around US$83 million.

Although the prison was designed to hold 1,738 inmates, in 2008–2009 it had 3,222 prisoners, with a staff of 751.

As of July 31, 2022, CVSP was incarcerating people at 125.2% of its design capacity, with 2,176 occupants.

Inmates were allowed to enter and leave their living quarters as they wished, except at night, during count times, or during lockdown procedures. As of 2016, CVSP Facilities have been designated as SNY, or Special Needs Yards. These are reserved for sex offenders, gang drop-outs, and former law enforcement personnel, as Ironwood State Prison (ISP) does next door.

The prison is staffed by approximately 400 sworn officers and 350 ancillary staff. Although the officers are trained in the use of firearms, most are armed with only pepper spray and a baton while on duty.

== Notable people ==
=== Staff ===
- Jennifer San Marco (1961–2006), perpetrator of the Goleta postal facility shootings; worked as a guard for several months

=== Inmates ===
- Anthony Gabriel Rodriguez (born c. 1973), one of several perpetrators of the 1995 murder of three year old Stephanie Kuhen
- Gerald Parker- Serial killer known as the Bludgeon killer.
