= KERU-FM =

- Blythe, California; United States
- Frequency: 88.5 MHz
- Branding: Radio Bilingue

Programming
- Affiliations: Spanish Public Radio

Ownership
- Owner: KERU-FM

History
- First air date: 1983

Technical information
- Licensing authority: FCC
- Facility ID: 19750
- Class: B
- ERP: 1,000 watts
- HAAT: 673.0 meters (2,208.0 ft)
- Transmitter coordinates: 33°34′12″N 114°20′55″W

Links
- Public license information: Public file; LMS
- Website: radiobilingue.org

KERU-FM (88.5 FM) is a bilingual radio station licensed to Blythe, California, and is an affiliate of the Spanish Public Radio network. The station was owned by Escuela de la Raza Unida until June 2016, when the school transferred ownership to the station's managers. The 100-watt station began broadcasting in 1983.
