= Blythe Photovoltaic Power Plant =

Solar farm in California, USA

- Country: United States
- Location: Blythe, Riverside County, California
- Coordinates: 33.59°N 114.74°W
- Status: Operational
- Construction began: September 2009
- Commission date: December 2009
- Owner: NRG Energy
- Operator: First Solar

Solar farm
- Type: Flat-panel PV

Power generation
- Nameplate capacity: 21 MW

The 21 megawatt Blythe Photovoltaic Power Plant is a photovoltaic (PV) solar project in California. It is located in Blythe, California, in Riverside County about 200 miles (320 km) east of Los Angeles. Commercial operation began in December 2009. Electricity generated by the power plant is being sold to Southern California Edison under a 20-year power purchase agreement. Another 20 MW plant called NRG Solar Blythe II came online in April 2017.

== Production ==
Generation (MW·h) of FSE Blythe 1 LLC
Year	Jan	Feb	Mar	Apr	May	Jun	Jul	Aug	Sep	Oct	Nov	Dec	Total
2009												1,372	1,372
2010	140	1,350	3,292	4,929	6,964	7,883	7,604	6,793	5,522	2,474	2,115	790	49,855
2011	29	2,191	3,135	5,202	6,384	8,204	7,057	7,270	5,018	4,011	1,424	1,351	51,275
2012	142	1,414	3,467	5,016	6,895	7,452	6,444	5,078	4,755	3,737	1,911	1,396	47,708
2013	861	1,764	3,004	3,167	3,564	4,543	4,286	5,768	5,607	4,964	4,941	5,156	47,624
2014	1,701	1,940	3,416	4,042	4,643	5,150	4,766	5,157	5,031	4,544	3,776	2,575	46,740
2015	2,192	2,763	4,049	4,544	4,568	4,706	4,871	4,930	4,069	3,427	3,175	2,614	45,908
Total													290,482

== See also ==
- Blythe Solar Power Project
- List of concentrating solar thermal power companies
- List of photovoltaic power stations
- List of solar thermal power stations
- Renewable energy in the United States
- Renewable portfolio standard
- Solar power in the United States
