= Chualar, California =

Unincorporated community in California, United States

- Unincorporated Community; Census Designated Place
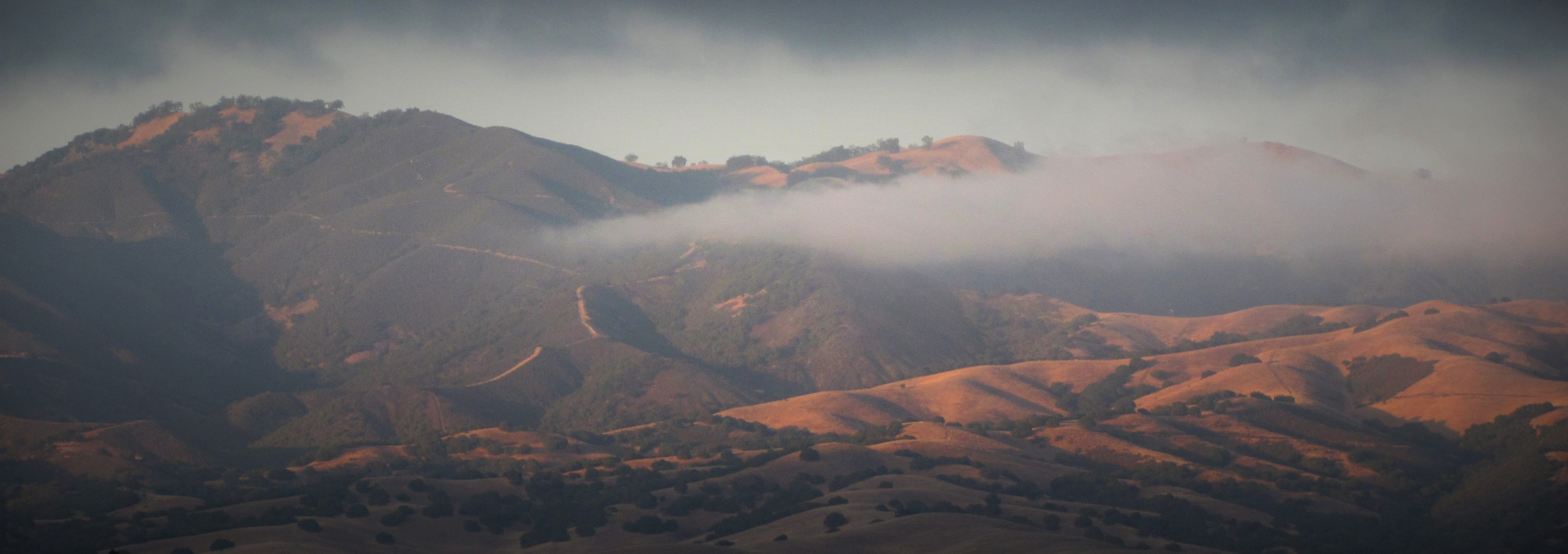
- View of the Gabilan Range from Chualar

- Location in Monterey County and the state of California

- Location in the United States
- Coordinates: 36°34′14″N 121°31′07″W
- Country: United States
- State: California
- County: Monterey

Government
  - State Senator: John Laird (D)
  - Assemblymember: Robert Rivas (D)
  - U. S. Rep.: Zoe Lofgren (D)

Area
  - Total: 0.63 sq mi (1.62 km^{2})
  - Land: 0.63 sq mi (1.62 km^{2})
  - Water: 0 sq mi (0.00 km^{2}) 0%
- Elevation: 115 ft (35 m)

Population (2020)
  - Total: 1,185
  - Density: 1,892.5/sq mi (730.71/km^{2})
- Time zone: UTC-8 (PST)
  - Summer (DST): UTC-7 (PDT)
- ZIP code: 93925
- Area code: 831
- FIPS code: 06-13364
- GNIS feature IDs: 1655896, 2407612

Chualar (Spanish for "Pigweed grove") is an unincorporated community and census-designated place (CDP) in the Salinas Valley of Monterey County, California, United States. Chualar is located 10 miles (16 km) southeast of Salinas, at an elevation of 115 feet (35 m). The population was 1,185 at the 2020 census.

== Geography ==
Chualar is located in northeastern Monterey County at 36°34′14″N 121°31′07″W. U.S. Route 101 runs along the southwestern side of the community, leading northwest to Salinas and southeast 16 miles (26 km) to Soledad.

According to the United States Census Bureau, the CDP has a total area of 0.6 square miles (1.6 km^{2}), all land.

In her Spanish and Indian Place Names of California (1914), Sanchez states that chualar was the indigenous word for an abundant and native goosefoot. This plant could possibly be Chenopodium californicum, the California goosefoot (also known as pigweed). In his 1500 California Place Names (1998), William Bright writes that the name is Spanish for "where the chual grows," chual being Mexican Spanish for pigweed or goosefoot, and derived ultimately from Nahuatl tzoalli.

== History ==
The Chualar post office opened in 1871, closed in 1873, and re-opened in 1874.

At a railroad crossing about one mile south of town, a bus carrying Mexican migrant workers collided with a train in September 1963, killing 32 passengers and injuring 25. It was the most serious road accident in U.S. history, and helped spur the abolition of the bracero guest worker program. The portion of U.S. Route 101 where the accident occurred was named the "Bracero Memorial Highway" on the 50th anniversary of the accident in 2013. At that time two survivors of the crash were still alive.

On December 4, 2019, a levee near Chualar was partially breached at 2 pm. Highway 101 was shut down due to the broken levee. Children were stranded at the local school with a few teachers overnight. The levee break also caused a nursing home to be evacuated.

Chualar was once owned by the Johnson family. They ran cattle on their 15,000+ acre ranch.

== Demographics ==
Historical population
Census	Pop.	Note	%±
2000	1,444		—
2010	1,190		−17.6%
2020	1,185		−0.4%
U.S. Decennial Census; 1850–1870 1880-1890; 1900 1910 1920; 1930 1940 1950; 1960 1970 1980; 1990 2000 2010

Chualar first appeared as a census designated place in the 2000 U.S. census.

=== 2020 census ===
As of the 2020 census, Chualar had a population of 1,185 and a population density of 1,893.0 inhabitants per square mile (730.9/km^{2}). The median age was 30.3 years. 31.8% of residents were under the age of 18 and 8.5% were 65 years of age or older. For every 100 females, there were 113.9 males, and for every 100 females age 18 and over, there were 115.5 males age 18 and over.

0.0% of residents lived in urban areas, while 100.0% lived in rural areas.

The Census reported that the whole population lived in households. There were 252 households, out of which 148 (58.7%) had children under the age of 18 living in them, 173 (68.7%) were married-couple households, 15 (6.0%) were cohabiting couple households, 34 (13.5%) had a female householder with no spouse or partner present, and 30 (11.9%) had a male householder with no spouse or partner present. 15 households (6.0%) were one person, and 5 (2.0%) were one person aged 65 or older. The average household size was 4.7. There were 230 families (91.3% of all households).

The age distribution was 377 people (31.8%) under the age of 18, 116 people (9.8%) aged 18 to 24, 350 people (29.5%) aged 25 to 44, 241 people (20.3%) aged 45 to 64, and 101 people (8.5%) who were 65 years of age or older.

There were 262 housing units at an average density of 418.5 units per square mile (161.6 units/km^{2}), of which 252 (96.2%) were occupied. Of the occupied units, 107 (42.5%) were owner-occupied and 145 (57.5%) were occupied by renters. 3.8% of housing units were vacant. The homeowner vacancy rate was 0.0% and the rental vacancy rate was 0.0%.

Racial composition as of the 2020 census
Race	Number	Percent
White	123	10.4%
Black or African American	0	0.0%
American Indian and Alaska Native	67	5.7%
Asian	9	0.8%
Native Hawaiian and Other Pacific Islander	0	0.0%
Some other race	603	50.9%
Two or more races	383	32.3%
Hispanic or Latino (of any race)	1,143	96.5%

=== Income and poverty ===
In 2023, the US Census Bureau estimated that the median household income was $66,250, and the per capita income was $20,437. About 15.9% of families and 17.5% of the population were below the poverty line.

=== 2010 census ===
The 2010 United States census reported that Chualar had a population of 1,190. The population density was 1,900.5 inhabitants per square mile (733.8/km^{2}). The racial makeup of Chualar was 337 (28.3%) White, 1 (0.1%) African American, 2 (0.2%) Native American, 11 (0.9%) Asian, 0 (0.0%) Pacific Islander, 827 (69.5%) from other races, and 12 (1.0%) from two or more races. Hispanic or Latino of any race were 1,151 persons (96.7%).

The Census reported that 1,190 people (100% of the population) lived in households, 0 (0%) lived in non-institutionalized group quarters, and 0 (0%) were institutionalized.

There were 245 households, out of which 179 (73.1%) had children under the age of 18 living in them, 160 (65.3%) were opposite-sex married couples living together, 49 (20.0%) had a female householder with no husband present, 22 (9.0%) had a male householder with no wife present. There were 17 (6.9%) unmarried opposite-sex partnerships, and 4 (1.6%) same-sex married couples or partnerships. 9 households (3.7%) were made up of individuals, and 5 (2.0%) had someone living alone who was 65 years of age or older. The average household size was 4.86. There were 231 families (94.3% of all households); the average family size was 4.79.

The population was spread out, with 429 people (36.1%) under the age of 18, 137 people (11.5%) aged 18 to 24, 330 people (27.7%) aged 25 to 44, 235 people (19.7%) aged 45 to 64, and 59 people (5.0%) who were 65 years of age or older. The median age was 26.6 years. For every 100 females, there were 103.1 males. For every 100 females age 18 and over, there were 95.1 males.

There were 251 housing units at an average density of 400.9 per square mile (154.8/km^{2}), of which 112 (45.7%) were owner-occupied, and 133 (54.3%) were occupied by renters. The homeowner vacancy rate was 0%; the rental vacancy rate was 1.5%. 553 people (46.5% of the population) lived in owner-occupied housing units and 637 people (53.5%) lived in rental housing units.
