= Mastamho =

Creator deity of the Mohave people

Mastamho, sometimes also referred to as Mustamho, is the creator deity of the first Mohave people along the Colorado River in the Mojave Desert and Colorado Desert. Mastamho is the grandson of the Earth Mother (in South America referred to as Pachamama) and the Sky father.

He was the son of Matavilya and had a sister, Frog Woman, and a brother, Kaatar. Mastamho is pictured on the Blythe Intaglios with stretched arms, which indicates that he protects his people from destruction.

== See also ==
- Chinigchinix
