= Chualar train-bus collision =

Train and bus crash in California on September 17, 1963

Chualar bus crash
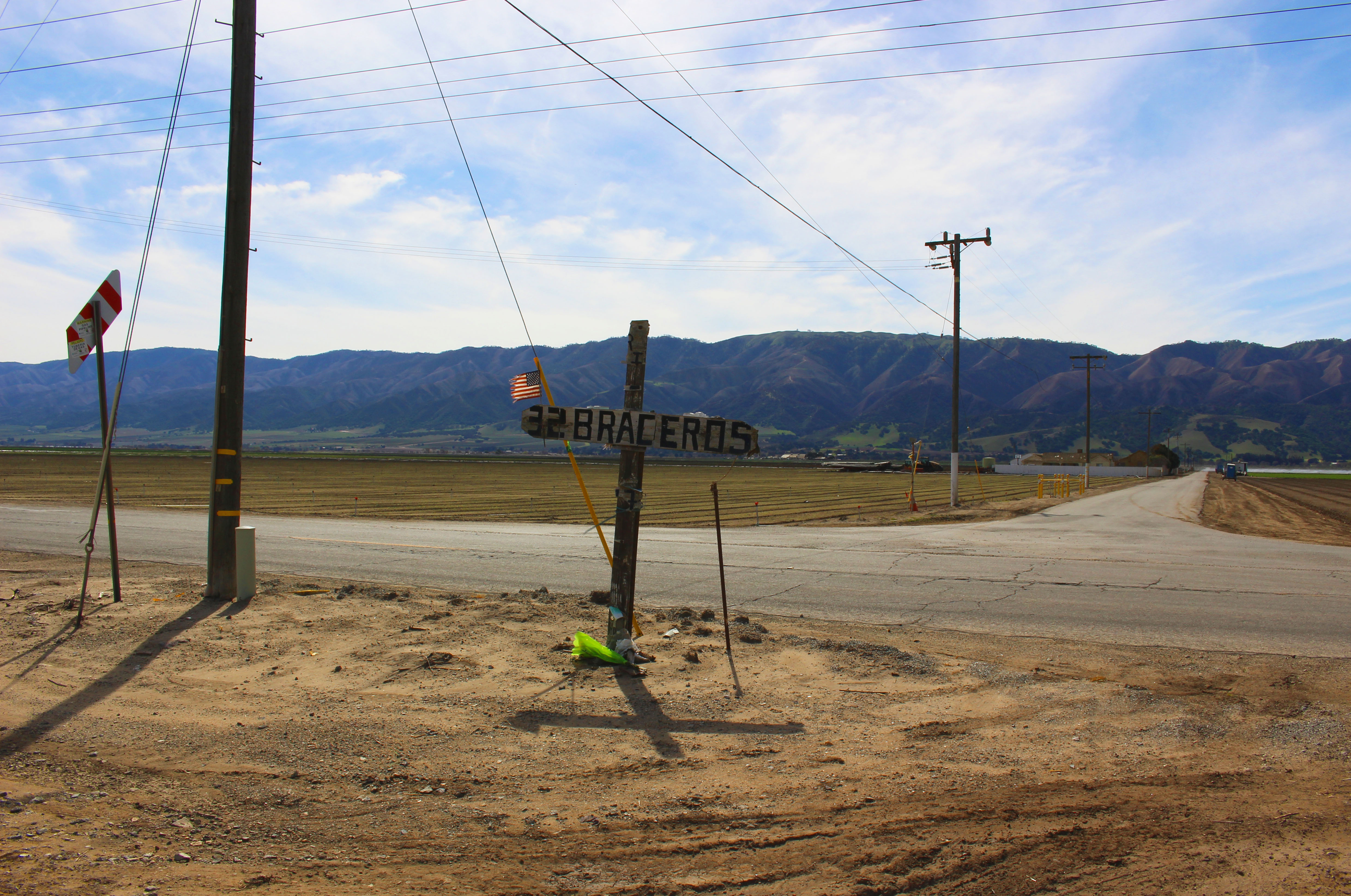
- The Chualar bus crash site in 2021

Details
- Date: September 17, 1963
- Location: Chualar, California, U.S.
- Coordinates: 36°33′14.24″N 121°30′10.44″W
- Incident type: Grade crossing collision
- Cause: Bus driver negligence

Statistics
- Vehicles: Freight train; Bus (illegally converted flatbed truck)
- Deaths: 32
- Injured: 25

The Chualar bus crash took place on September 17, 1963, when a freight train collided with a makeshift "bus" — a flatbed truck with two long benches and a canopy — carrying 58 migrant farmworkers on a railroad crossing outside Chualar in the Salinas Valley, California, United States, killing 32 people and injuring 25. The crash is ranked as the deadliest automobile accident in U.S. history according to the National Safety Council, although the March 14, 1940 Alamo, Texas train-bus collision is deadlier with 34 fatalities.

The collision was a factor in the decision by Congress in 1964 to terminate the bracero program, despite its strong support among farmers. It also helped spur the Chicano Civil Rights Movement.

== Background ==
The workers riding on the bus lived at the Earl Myers Company labor camp in Salinas, Monterey County, California, and were returning after a ten-hour shift harvesting celery and other vegetables from two fields in the Salinas Valley. 53 were braceros contracted by the Growers Farm Labor Association of Salinas. There were also five non-bracero farm laborers, including one undocumented immigrant and two transients who were not Mexican-Americans. Of the five, only the undocumented immigrant was killed.

The passengers were riding on two long board benches running the length of the vehicle, which was a flatbed truck covered with a canopy, with the passengers unable to communicate with the driver. It was typical of the converted vehicles used to transport farmworkers in California, which in subsequent years have been criticized for endangering the safety of farmworkers. Some of the workers were sitting on the floor of the bus amid metal food containers and long knives used in the harvesting. The driver was the workers' foreman, Francisco "Pancho" Espinosa, who was a permanent U.S. resident.

== Crash ==
Between 4:20 to 4:25 p.m., Espinosa was traveling east on Thomas Ranch Road, a private country lane, approaching a single railroad track just to the west of, and parallel to, U.S. Route 101, a mile south of Chualar and about eight miles south of Salinas. The crossing, which was privately maintained, was not marked by lights, signs or signals. There were no trees, crops or other objects impeding visibility down the train tracks.

A freight train from the Southern Pacific Railroad with four diesel locomotives, the lead unit being SP 5857, an ALCO RS-11, pulling 71 cars carrying sugar beets and a caboose, was approaching from the south at a high speed (either 61 miles per hour (98 km/h), according to the railroad, or 67 miles per hour (108 km/h), according to the California Highway Patrol). The precise speed was never determined with certainty. The train crew applied the emergency brake. Not realizing the train was approaching, the driver moved slowly across the tracks. The train collided with the bus. Despite the application of the emergency brake, the train did not come to a stop until the front of the train had proceeded 3,050 feet (930 m) north of the intersection.

Years later, a survivor recalled that the bus was struck in the rear, and that he survived because he went to the front.

== Victims ==
The 32 dead and injured were scattered around the tracks, some thrown more than 100 feet (30 m). Twenty-three died at the scene and nine died en route to the hospital or afterwards. Fifteen ambulances carried victims from the scene. Many casualties were inflicted by being dragged along with the bus and direct impact by the train, while other injuries were caused by splintered flooring planks, jagged edges of twisted metal, harvest knives and metal equipment. One victim was cut in half by the wheels of the train. The injuries were so gruesome that blood flowed like water from one ambulance, according to one account. The dead ranged in age from 19 to 59, and a partial count indicated that they left behind 37 dependents under the age of 16. They came from the Mexican states of Sonora, Guanajuato, Michoacán, Puebla, Jalisco and Zacatecas.

No one on the train was hurt, and the only person on the bus who was uninjured was the driver, Espinosa.

=== Identification ===
Initially only twelve bodies were identified, because of the custom that the workers be identified only by number, not by name, and the Federal Bureau of Investigation was called in to identify most of the deceased. The failure to identify the bodies was cited by critics of the bracero program, who said it indicated how Mexican workers were not treated as persons. The funeral arrangements became a fiasco, with Salinas municipal authorities and the Mexican consulate fighting over who would handle the bodies. Local newspapers reported a "macabre funeral hassle". Ultimately the dispute was resolved, the town was allowed to participate, and around 9,000 people attended the funeral, which was held at Palma High School in Salinas.

== Court proceedings and investigations ==
Espinosa was arrested and charged with 32 counts of felony manslaughter, which were later reduced to misdemeanor counts after a grand jury recommended leniency. He claimed he did not hear or see the train approaching, and was acquitted in December 1963 after a four-day trial. An Interstate Commerce Commission investigation blamed the accident on him for failure to exercise "due caution" at the crossing. The ICC determined that Espinosa had "an unobstructed view of the railroad throughout a considerable distance," and that "the driver could have readily observed the approaching northbound train if he had looked southward along the track."

Espinosa, in fear of retribution, fled California after his acquittal. In September 1964, a state official, who was seeking to serve notice of revocation of his driver's license, reported that his sister-in-law said Espinosa had been slain in Mexico by relatives of crash victims. That account was disputed.

In 1967, a federal court lawsuit filed by the victims' families was settled by payment of $1.5 million. The sum was divided among 24 injured and 164 heirs of workers killed in the crash, most of whom lived in Mexico. The defendants in the suit were the Southern Pacific Railroad, Growers Farm Labor Association, Harden Farms and Myers Corporations of Salinas. The State Compensation Fund had already paid $450,000 to beneficiaries and was expected to pay $400,000 more.

In 2014, a crash survivor recalled receiving 92,000 Mexican pesos as compensation in 1968.

=== Galarza inquiry ===
Ernesto Galarza, a Mexican-American labor activist, was appointed to investigate the tragedy by Adam Clayton Powell Jr., chairman of the Committee on Education and Labor of the U.S. House of Representatives. His investigation was opposed by the California Farm Bureau Federation, which contended that Galarza was biased, and met with local suspicion and hostility, as well as lack of cooperation from Demco Farms, the owner of the bus. Galarza reported that Espinosa was kept in seclusion, preventing him from giving testimony, and that Southern Pacific declined to permit inspection of its equipment until some time after the accident. His report also stated that survivor testimony was not put on the record of the Espinosa trial or any hearing.

Galarza found that Espinosa was a diabetic, which curbed his field of vision, and the foreman sitting to his right impaired his view of the oncoming train. Although Espinosa's defense at the trial was that his field of view was limited by telephone poles and signal posts, as well as by his diabetes, Galarza had not found any manmade objects obstructing his view of the railroad track. Galarza also questioned how Espinosa could have obtained his chauffeur's license, since he did not speak English. His investigation concluded that the accident exemplified the growers' disregard for the safety of the bracero workers. He found that the accident was directly caused by negligence, exemplifying a practice in which flatbed trucks were illegally converted to buses, driven by poorly trained personnel, which had caused several other bus crashes causing multiple fatalities. He recommended that regulation of transportation of migrant workers be improved.

Galarza's 72-page report to the House Education and Labor Committee was published in April 1964. He also wrote a book on the accident and its aftermath, Tragedy at Chualar, which was published in 1977.

== Legacy ==
The accident has long been a rallying point for immigration rights and Chicano farmworker activists. All but two of the victims were Mexican or Mexican-American, and most were Mexican guest workers participating in the bracero program, which had been in place since 1942 and had been drawing mounting criticism from labor activists and civil rights workers who contended that it exploited Mexican laborers and deprived Americans of jobs. The accident supported the views of critics that Bracero workers were treated shabbily, helping to spur the demise of the program in 1964.

The accident was a reminder of the braceros' vulnerability as guest workers in the United States. Union leaders and Mexican-American activists contended that the tragedy demonstrated the inequities in the bracero program, which they contended exploited Mexicans while displacing American workers. It spurred the development of the Chicano civil rights movement.

The lead locomotive of the train, SP 5857, was repaired and put back into service, later being renumbered #2922. A crash test and approximate recreation of the collision was conducted in the 1980s with a Union Pacific Railroad GE U30C locomotive and an unoccupied school bus. Coincidentally, the locomotive used for the crash test was numbered 2922.

Two survivors of the bus crash were still alive as of 2014.

The current location of the crash site is adjacent to the intersection of Foletta Road and Broome Road. At some unknown date after the accident Broome Road was reconfigured to prevent any crossing of the train tracks.

== Commemorations ==
The portion of Route 101 where the accident occurred was named "Bracero Memorial Highway" at the 50th anniversary of the accident in 2013. At that time two survivors of the crash were still alive.

== See also ==
- 1974 Blythe, California bus crash
- Bracero program
- List of grade crossing accidents
- List of traffic accidents by death toll in the United States
