= Palo Verde Hospital =

- Palo Verde Health Care District

Geography
- Location: Blythe, California, United States
- Coordinates: 33°36′47″N 114°35′43″W

Organization
- Care system: Private
- Type: Acute Care Hospital

Services
- Beds: 51

History
- Founded: 1925

Links
- Website: http://www.paloverdehospital.org
- Lists: Hospitals in California

Palo Verde Hospital is an acute care hospital located in Blythe, California.
