= Ironwood State Prison =

State prison in Blythe, California

Ironwood State Prison (ISP)
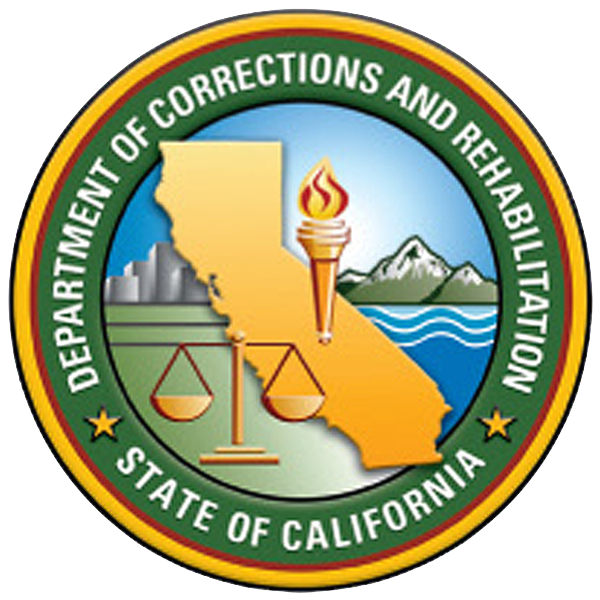
- Aerial View
- Interactive map of Ironwood State Prison (ISP)
- Location: Riverside County, near Blythe, California; 33°33′32″N 114°55′36″W
- Status: Operational
- Security class: Minimum-medium
- Capacity: 2,200
- Population: 2,601 (118.2% capacity) (January 31, 2023)
- Opened: 1 February 1994
- Managed by: California Department of Corrections and Rehabilitation
- Warden: Neil McDowell

Ironwood State Prison (ISP) is a state prison located south of Interstate 10, in a detached section of Blythe, California, that lies west of the main portion of the city. It is located in eastern Riverside County, California, adjacent to Chuckawalla Valley State Prison.

Location of Blythe in Riverside County, and Riverside County in California

== Facilities and programs ==
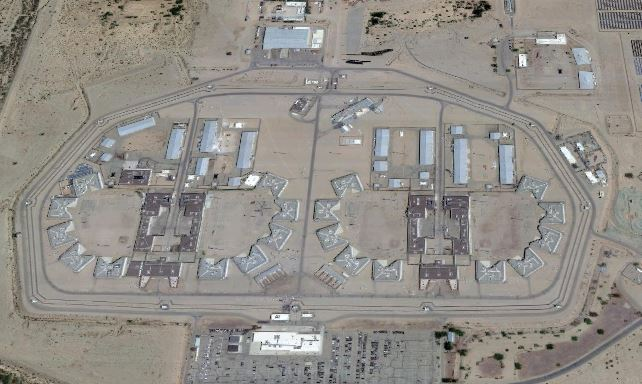
Aerial view of Ironwood State Prison

ISP consists of four Level III facilities and an outside Level I facility. Parts of the Level III facilities have been converted to Sensitive Needs Yard (SNY) housing, and one of the Level III housing units has been converted to an Administrative Segregation Unit. Neil McDowell has been the warden or acting warden since 2014.

As of July 31, 2022, ISP was incarcerating people at 112% of its design capacity, with 2,464 occupants.

ISP lists the following programs as available to those incarcerated in the facility:

- Academic: Adult Basic Education I, Adult Basic Education II, GED, Independent Study
- Vocational: Auto Body, Auto Mechanics, Building Maintenance, Carpentry, Electronics, Masonry, Office Services Related Tech, Plumbing, Welding
- Rehabilitative: Actors’ Gang, Alcoholics Anonymous, Alternatives to Violence, Anti-Recidivism Coalition, Community Based Art Program, Criminals and Gangs Anonymous, Father2Child Literacy Program, Great Dads, Healing Dialogue and Action, I-4-Sight, Inmate Peer Education Program, Inside Out Writers, Kairos, Life's Too Short (Youth Diversion Program), Lifer's Group, Narcotics Anonymous, Meditation Buddhist Pathways, Partnership for Re-Entry Program, Prison of Peace, Seven Areas of Life Training, Siddha Yoga Meditation, The Urban Ministries Institute, Veterans Group Ironwood, Victim Offender Education Group

In 2015, ISP became the second launch site for The Last Mile, a non-profit organization that teaches computer programming to inmates in prisons.

== Notable events ==
In 2014, the Anti-Recidivism Coalition teamed up with the Ford Foundation and others to host a TEDx conference inside Ironwood with hundreds in attendance, including Richard Branson. ARC produced a short documentary about the event. A short documentary is accessible on YouTube.

== Notable people incarcerated at the prison ==
- Robert John Bardo - Murdered actress Rebecca Schaeffer on July 18, 1989. Was serving time at Ironwood State Prison in Blythe, California, in 2012. Currently an inmate at the Avenal State Prison in Avenal, California.
- Eric Naposki - Former professional football player.
