= Palo Verde Unified School District =

Public school district in Riverside County, California

Address
- 825 North Lovekin Boulevard Blythe, California, 92225; United States

District information
- Grades: K–12
- Schools: One Head Start School, Three Elementary Schools, One High School (6-12), and One Continuation School
- NCES District ID: 0629640

Students and staff
- Students: 2,821 (2020–2021)
- Teachers: 116.99 (FTE)
- Staff: 180.46 (FTE)
- Student–teacher ratio: 180.46 (FTE)

Other information
- Website: www.pvusd.us

Palo Verde Unified School District is a public school district in Riverside County, California, United States.

== Schools ==
The public school district's 6 schools are

=== Elementary (K-8) ===
- Felix J. Appleby Elementary - opened 2000s, replaced earlier site.
- Margaret White Elementary - opened 1990s/2000s.
- Ruth Brown (formerly Central) Elementary - district's oldest - (special studies).

=== Middle ===
- Blythe Middle School (merged with the District's 3 subsequent elementary schools, opened in 1930s, and closed in 2017)

=== High ===
- Palo Verde High School (Blythe, California)
- Twin Palms High School (continuation)
