= Ripley, California =

Ripley
- Census-designated place
- Location in Riverside County, California

- Location within the state of California Ripley (the United States)
- Coordinates: 33°31′26″N 114°39′11″W
- Country: United States
- State: California
- County: Riverside

Area
  - Total: 1.701 sq mi (4.405 km^{2})
  - Land: 1.701 sq mi (4.405 km^{2})
  - Water: 0 sq mi (0 km^{2}) 0%
- Elevation: 249 ft (76 m)

Population (2020)
  - Total: 538
  - Density: 316/sq mi (122/km^{2})
- Time zone: UTC-8 (Pacific (PST))
  - Summer (DST): UTC-7 (PDT)
- ZIP codes: 92272
- Area code: 760
- GNIS feature ID: 2583122

Ripley is a census-designated place community in east Riverside County. It is located along State Route 78 (SR78) between Palo Verde and Blythe. The area is mostly agricultural lands irrigated by Colorado River water. The elevation is 249 feet (76 m). The population was 538 at the 2020 census, down from 692 at the 2010 census.

== History ==
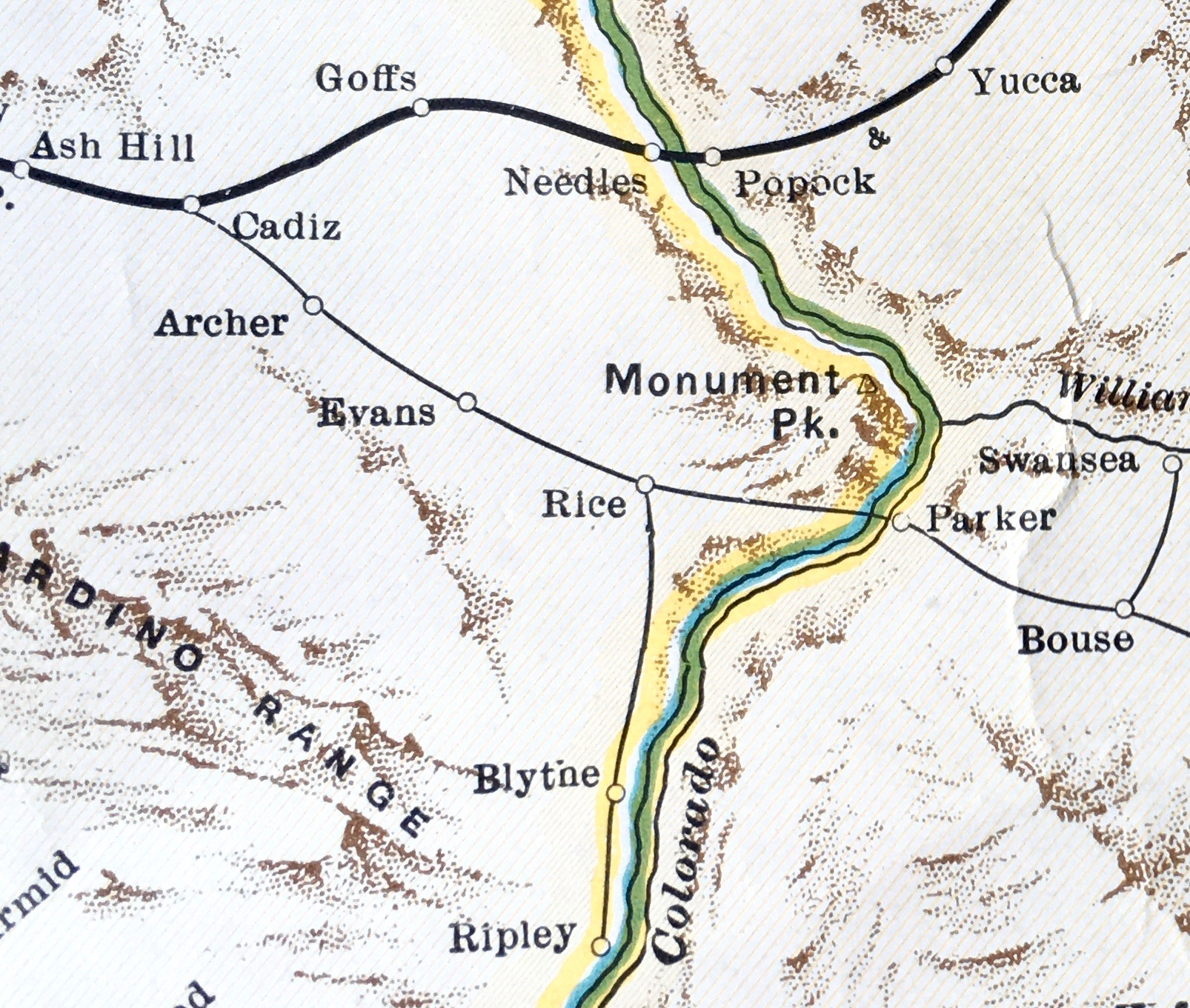
Route in 1930

Ripley was established in 1920 when the California Southern Railroad (unrelated to the railroad linking Barstow and San Diego) was extended from Blythe. The townsite was named to dedicate former Santa Fe Railway president Edward Payson Ripley. The town aimed to be a resort location until it was damaged by a flood that swept part of the valley in 1922. Today, a water tower remains as a landmark in town.

Ripley is near the site of a 1974 fatal bus wreck.

== Geography ==
According to the United States Census Bureau, the CDP covers an area of 1.7 square miles (4.4 km^{2}), all of it land. Alongside Blythe and Palo Verde, Ripley is located in the Palo Verde Valley.

Official U.S. Geological Survey NAD27 coordinates for the community are 33°31′31″N 114°39′19″W. It is within area code 760 and has its own ZIP Code: 92272.

=== Climate ===
This area has a large amount of sunshine year round due to its stable descending air and high pressure. According to the Köppen Climate Classification system, Ripley has a desert climate, abbreviated "Bwh" on climate maps.

== Situation ==
The area is largely irrigated agriculture. Farms in the area include operations owned by David Brown and Sons, Lawrence Chaffin Farms, and Red River Farms. The Metropolitan Water District has made an agreement with the United States Bureau of Reclamation to fallow land in the area in order to conserve water. Farmers will be paid not to grow crops so that the water can be used for other purposes. The area is served by Palo Verde Irrigation District and formerly the Arizona and California Railroad. The railroad's Blythe Division track ends just west of Ripley.

== Demographics ==
Historical population
Census	Pop.	Note	%±
2010	692		—
2020	538		−22.3%
U.S. Decennial Census; 1860–1870 1880-1890; 1900 1910 1920; 1930 1940 1950; 1960 1970 1980; 1990 2000 2010

Ripley first appeared as a census-designated place in the 2010 U.S. census.

=== Racial and ethnic composition ===
Ripley CDP, California – Racial and ethnic composition Note: the US Census treats Hispanic/Latino as an ethnic category. This table excludes Latinos from the racial categories and assigns them to a separate category. Hispanics/Latinos may be of any race.
Race / Ethnicity (NH = Non-Hispanic)	Pop 2010	Pop 2020	% 2010	% 2020
White alone (NH)	59	44	8.53%	8.18%
Black or African American alone (NH)	88	56	12.72%	10.41%
Native American or Alaska Native alone (NH)	0	5	0.00%	0.93%
Asian alone (NH)	1	2	0.14%	0.37%
Native Hawaiian or Pacific Islander alone (NH)	3	0	0.43%	0.00%
Other race alone (NH)	1	3	0.14%	0.56%
Mixed race or Multiracial (NH)	3	32	0.43%	5.95%
Hispanic or Latino (any race)	537	396	77.60%	73.61%
Total	692	538	100.00%	100.00%

=== 2020 census ===
The 2020 United States census reported that Ripley had a population of 538. The population density was 316.3 inhabitants per square mile (122.1/km^{2}). The racial makeup of Ripley was 122 (22.7%) White, 59 (11.0%) African American, 8 (1.5%) Native American, 2 (0.4%) Asian, 0 (0.0%) Pacific Islander, 216 (40.1%) from other races, and 131 (24.3%) from two or more races. Hispanic or Latino of any race were 396 persons (73.6%).

The whole population lived in households. There were 194 households, out of which 72 (37.1%) had children under the age of 18 living in them, 66 (34.0%) were married-couple households, 11 (5.7%) were cohabiting couple households, 73 (37.6%) had a female householder with no partner present, and 44 (22.7%) had a male householder with no partner present. 53 households (27.3%) were one person, and 24 (12.4%) were one person aged 65 or older. The average household size was 2.77. There were 131 families (67.5% of all households).

The age distribution was 169 people (31.4%) under the age of 18, 51 people (9.5%) aged 18 to 24, 113 people (21.0%) aged 25 to 44, 126 people (23.4%) aged 45 to 64, and 79 people (14.7%) who were 65 years of age or older. The median age was 31.6 years. For every 100 females, there were 83.0 males.

There were 270 housing units at an average density of 158.7 units per square mile (61.3 units/km^{2}), of which 194 (71.9%) were occupied. Of these, 62 (32.0%) were owner-occupied, and 132 (68.0%) were occupied by renters.
