= Topock Maze =

Archaeological site in California, United States

- Topock Maze Archeological Site
- U.S. National Register of Historic Places
- Location within California Location within the United States
- Nearest city: Needles, California
- Coordinates: 34°42′57.48″N 114°29′51.93″W
- Area: 0.8 acres (0.32 ha)
- NRHP reference No.: 78000745
- Added to NRHP: October 5, 1978

Topock Maze is an archaeological site located south of Interstate 40 near Needles, California. The site consists of numerous rows and groups of parallel lines; while hypothesized to be a geoglyph, the purpose, age, and creators of the lines are disputed. A 1908 report by Edward M. Curtis suggested that the site was built as some sort of maze or labyrinth, inspiring its name; however, later research has concluded that this was not the site's purpose. A 1978 study by Arda M. Haenszel proposed that the lines were prehistoric and had some sort of religious or ceremonial significance to the native Mojave people; this conclusion was supported by a 2005 study. Archaeologist Ruth Arlene Musser-Lopez published a study in 2011 which concluded that the lines were created recently, likely by gravel scraping operations during railroad construction in the 1880s; however, they were built over a preexisting prehistoric art site.

The site was added to the National Register of Historic Places on October 5, 1978.
