= Ferrostaal =

Ferrostaal GmbH
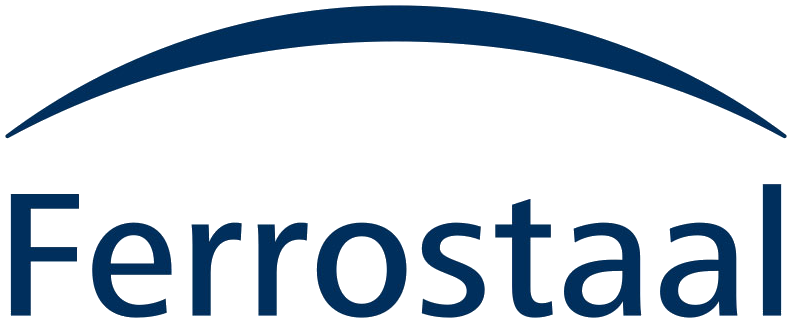
- Formerly: MAN Ferrostaal AG; Ferrostaal AG
- Type: Private company: GmbH
- Industry: Industrial Services and Machinery Supply
- Founded: 1920; 106 years ago
- Headquarters: Essen, Germany
- Number of locations: more than 40 countries worldwide
- Area served: global
- Key people: Executive Board: Dr. John Benjamin Schroeder, Dr. Klaus Lesker, Joachim Ludwig, Ralf Schwarzhaupt, Dr. Michael Bütter
- Products: Petrochemicals, printing machinery, food processing and packaging converting, etc
- Services: industrial services
- Revenue: ▲€ 1,6 billion (2008)
- Net income: ▲€ 100 million(2008)
- Number of employees: 4,400 (2008)
- Parent: Franz Haniel & Cie.
- Website: ferrostaal.com

Ferrostaal is a German-owned industrial services company. It has 4,400 employees and an annual turnover of around 1.6 billion euros (2008), and has a market presence in around 40 countries. The company's activities are focused in two areas: Projects (Petrochemicals, Industrial Plants, Solar Energy and Power) and Services (Equipment, Piping, Automotive). In 2009, the International Petroleum Investment Company (IPIC) of Abu Dhabi took over 70% of the shares of Ferrostaal AG from MAN AG, Munich. Due to the acquisition of the majority shares, the company entered the commercial register as Ferrostaal, signifying its separation from the MAN Group.

== History ==
Ferrostaal was founded in The Hague, Netherlands, in 1920. The steel trading company was bought by Gutehoffnungshütte Aktienverein (GHH) in 1926. Over time Ferrostaal expanded into more countries, and had a presence in the international steel trade from the 1950s onwards. During the 1960s the company started building industrial plants. Until the end of the 1960s, Ferrostaal was also a manufacturer of diesel railcars and railbuses. In 2004 it was renamed MAN Ferrostaal. Three years later the corporation sold two thirds of its steel business. In 2007 Solar and Biofuels were created as new strategic business areas. As a result of IPIC taking over the majority of shares of MAN Ferrostaal AG, the company changed its name into Ferrostaal AG.

In March 2012, MAN SE announced the sale of Ferrostaal AG to the MPC Group. Since March 2012 Ferrostaal has been owned by MPC Industries GmbH and the company's name has been changed to Ferrostaal GmbH.
