= Blythe, California =

City in California, United States

- City
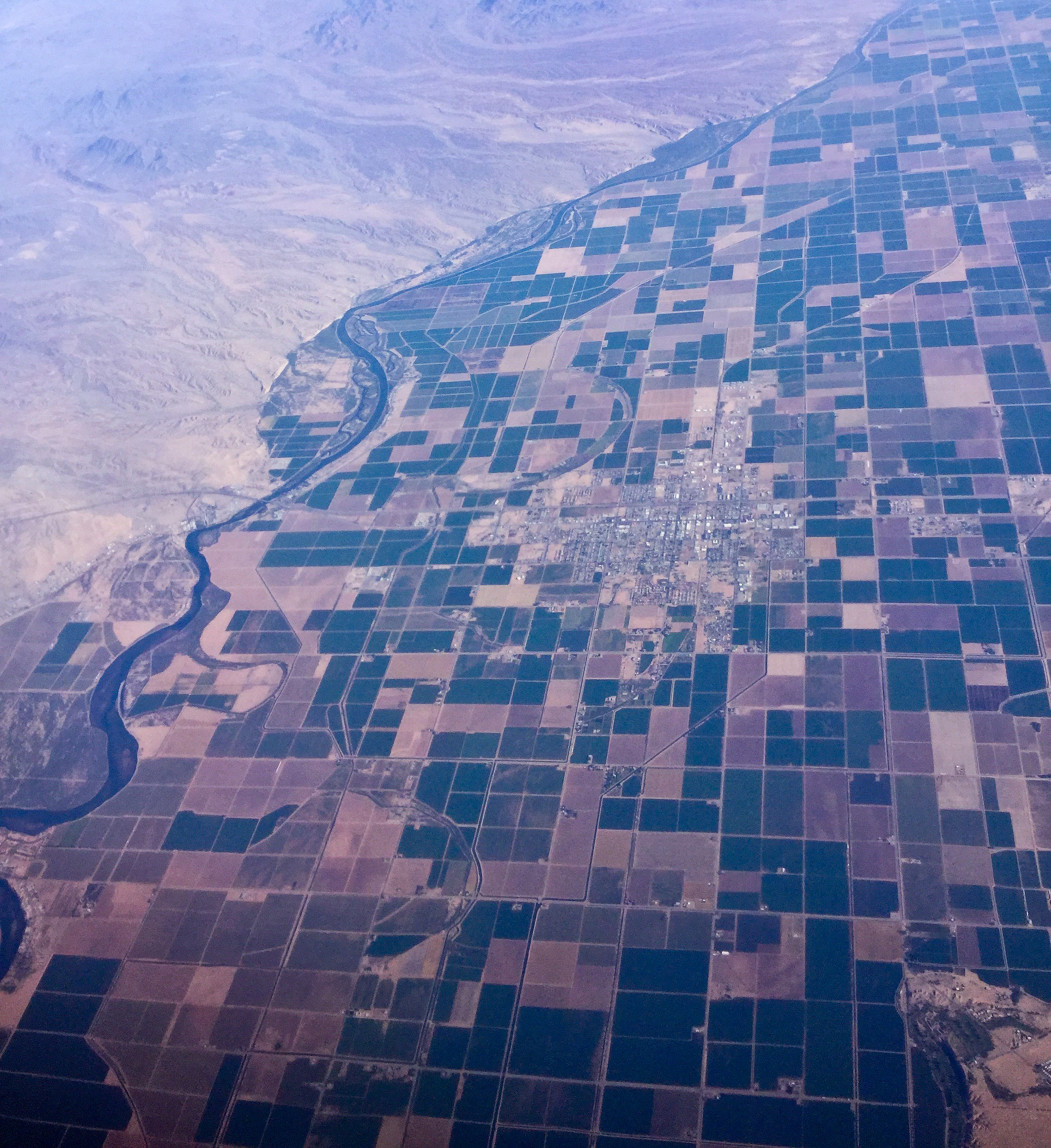
- Blythe as viewed from the sky

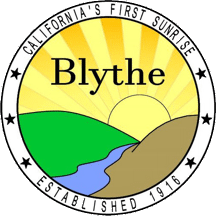
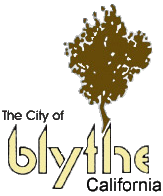
- Seal Logo
- Interactive map of Blythe, California
- Location in California Location in the United States
- Coordinates: 33°36′37″N 114°35′47″W
- Country: United States
- State: California
- County: Riverside
- Incorporated: July 21, 1916
- Named for: Thomas Henry Blythe

Government
  - Type: Council-Manager
  - Mayor: Joseph "Joey" Deconinck
  - Vice Mayor: Johnny Rodriguez
  - City Council: Sam Burton; Joseph Halby III; Summer Spraggins

Area
  - Total: 27.37 sq mi (70.88 km^{2})
  - Land: 26.58 sq mi (68.85 km^{2})
  - Water: 0.78 sq mi (2.03 km^{2}) 2.90%
- Elevation: 272 ft (83 m)

Population (2020)
  - Total: 18,317
  - Density: 689.0/sq mi (266.04/km^{2})
- Time zone: UTC−08:00 (PST)
  - Summer (DST): UTC−07:00 (PDT)
- ZIP Codes: 92225–92226
- Area code: 442/760
- FIPS code: 06-07218
- GNIS feature IDs: 1660349, 2409872
- Website: www.cityofblythe.ca.gov

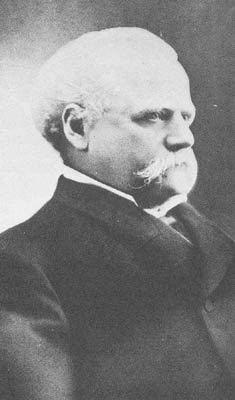
Thomas Henry Blythe

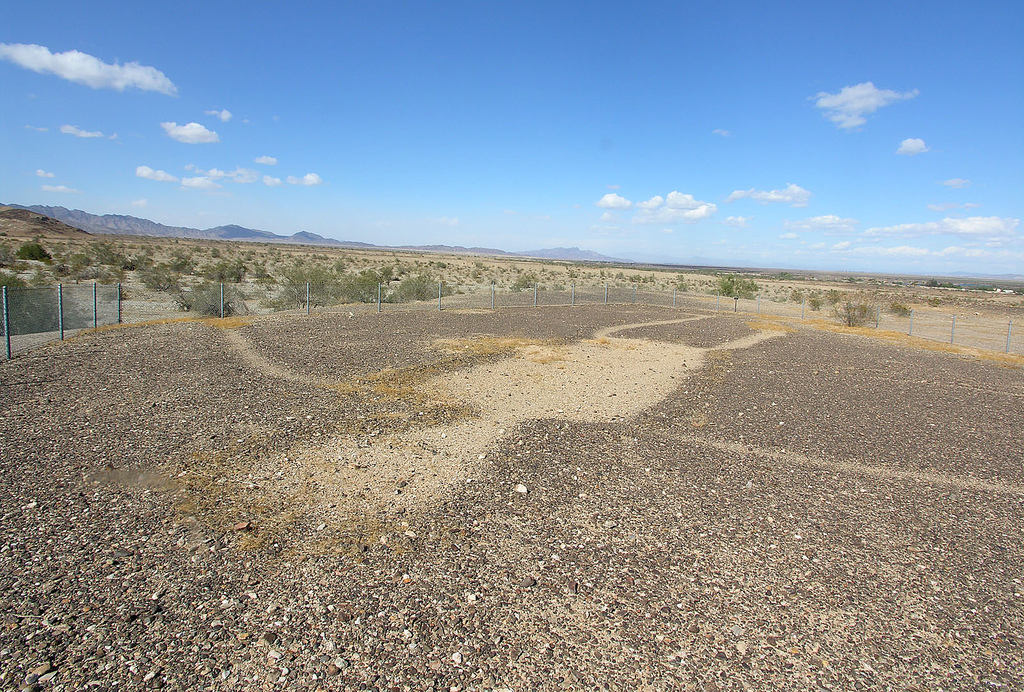
One of the Blythe Intaglios, prehistoric geoglyphs in the Sonoran Desert, across the river from Parker Valley.

Blythe (/blaɪθ/) is a city in eastern Riverside County, California, United States. It is in the Palo Verde Valley of the Lower Colorado River Valley region, an agricultural area and part of the Colorado Desert along the Colorado River, approximately 224 miles (360 km) east of Los Angeles and 150 miles (240 km) west of Phoenix. Blythe was named after Thomas Henry Blythe, a San Francisco financier, who established primary water rights to the Colorado River in the region in 1877. The city was incorporated on July 21, 1916. The population was 18,317 at the 2020 census.

== History ==
Native Americans lived in the area.

=== Etymology ===
Blythe was named after Thomas Henry Blythe, a San Francisco businessman and entrepreneur. Blythe established primary water rights to the Colorado River in the southwestern California region in 1877. The town was originally named Blythe City, by Thomas Blythe, but the name was shortened to simply Blythe around the time the first post office was opened in 1908.

=== Early years ===
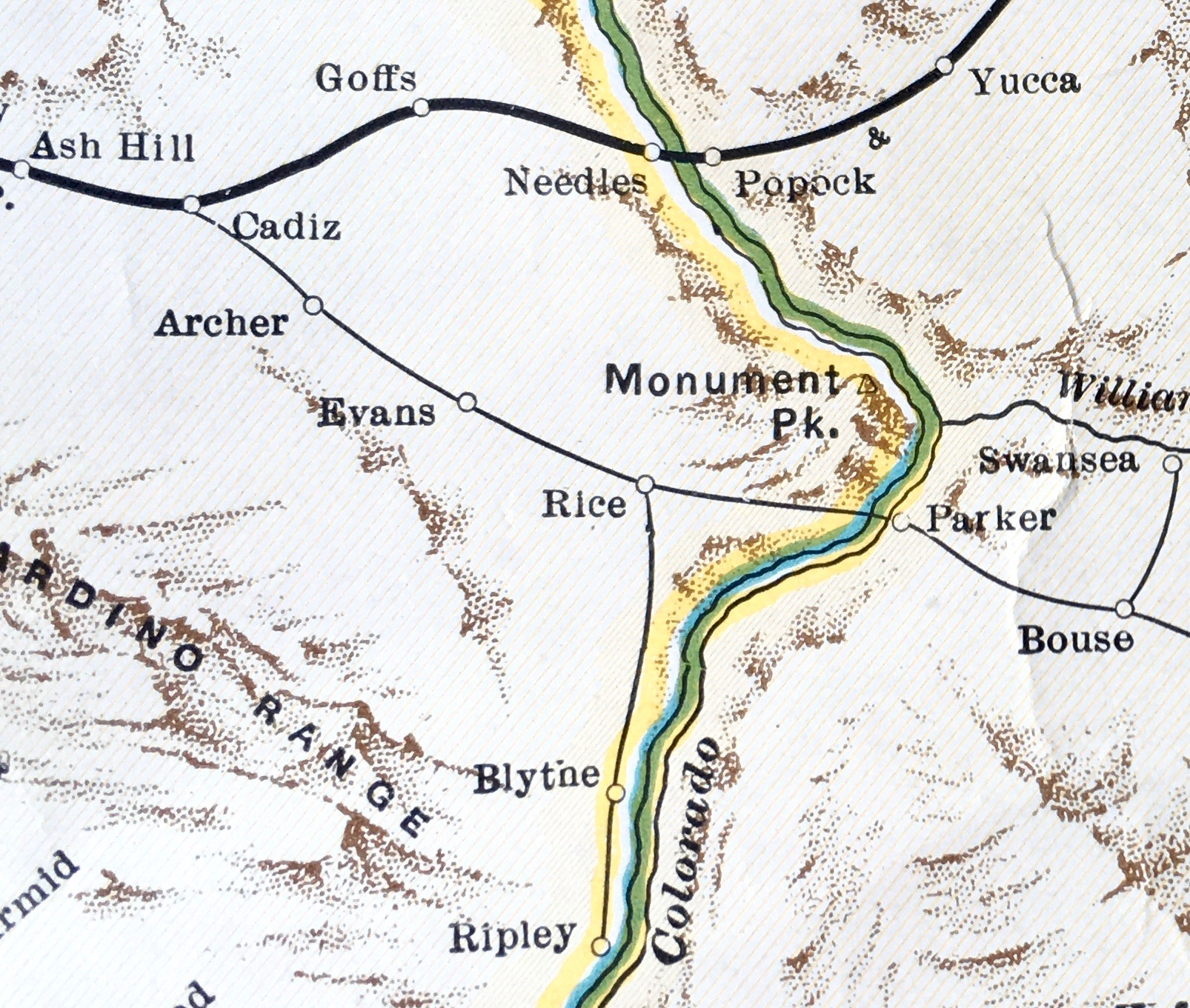
Route in 1930

In the early or mid-1870s, William Calloway (known as Oliver Calloway in some sources), an engineer and a former captain of the 1st California Infantry Regiment, explored an area across the Colorado River from Ehrenberg, Arizona, and found its potential for development. Calloway made preliminary surveys and filed land claims under the Swamp Land Act of 1850. He interested the wealthy San Francisco capitalist Thomas Henry Blythe (originally born Thomas Williams in Mold, Wales) to undertake development and settlement of an "empire" located next to the Colorado. Together they purchased a total of 140,000 acres under the Swamp Land Act, and another 35,000 acres under the Desert Land Act of 1877.

On July 17, 1877, Blythe filed his first claim for Colorado River water on what was to become the "Blythe Intake". Blythe appointed another man named George Irish as manager to assist Calloway in building an irrigation system. Calloway died in a Chemehuevi attack on March 28, 1880, and was replaced by C.C. Miller, the father of Frank Augustus Miller. Thomas Blythe died on April 4, 1883; his only revisit to the valley was in November 1882. After his death, the work in the valley halted and Blythe's estate subsequently went into litigation between his illegitimate daughter Florence and other claimants, the trial beginning in 1889. In the 1900s, Florence was awarded the estate, after several years of preceding rulings in favor of her and appeals against her.

=== 20th century ===
Frank Murphy and Ed Williams, who were involved with the cattle industry in southeastern Arizona, came to the area in 1904 and were convinced it was well-suited for cattle and farming. With the Hobson brothers from Ventura County, they bought Blythe's estate and formed the Palo Verde Land and Water Company. During 1911–1912, W.F. Holt, who helped develop nearby Imperial Valley, was the company's general manager.

On August 8, 1916, the California Southern Railroad reached Blythe from the desert station of Rice, then known as Blythe Junction. It was later renamed to honor G.W. Rice, an engineer and superintendent of the railroad. The dramatic growth in the valley following this event attracted national attention. Production totals increased annually from virtually nothing to near $8,000,000 in few years, primarily from cotton and cotton seed shipped to the ports. The lower cotton prices in 1920 ended this prosperous time. The Atchison, Topeka and Santa Fe Railway began leasing the line in 1921 and acquired it at the end of 1942.

The first automobile bridge over the Colorado River between Blythe and Ehrenberg was constructed in 1928 to replace a cable ferry service. The bridge's successor was built in the early 1960s and was expanded to four lanes and a pedestrian walkway in early 1974.

In 1935, the completion of Boulder Dam extinguished the annual destructive floods in the valley. As noted during the city's fiftieth anniversary, some forty crops were grown on the farms, and large cattle feeds were another aspect of the agriculture industry. As of 1947, the Fisher ranch had the biggest herd of registered Brahman cattle in California, the breeding stock having been sold to western states and other countries.

During World War II, Blythe was the site of United States Army Air Forces facilities at the Blythe Airport and the Gary Field.

In 1972, Interstate 10 was built through the city, replacing US 60 and the previously decommissioned US 70 on Hobsonway as the main thoroughfare.

=== 21st century ===
In 2016, the voter-approved recreational use of cannabis in California has made the cannabis industry drawn to the economically declined city due to lower land prices, water, and potentially lower taxes compared to other parts of the state.

== Geography and climate ==
Blythe is located near the California/Arizona border in the Colorado Desert section of the Sonoran Desert, at the junction of Interstate 10 and US 95. According to the United States Census Bureau, the city has a total area of 27.0 square miles (70 km^{2}), of which 26.2 square miles (68 km^{2}) is land and 0.8 square miles (2.1 km^{2}) (2.9%) is water.

Nearby communities include Vidal to the north, Ripley to the south, Desert Center to the west, and Ehrenberg, Arizona, to the east. Major cities in the region include Yuma (85 miles), Indio (95 miles), Phoenix (150 miles), San Bernardino (170 miles), Riverside (172 miles), and Las Vegas (200 miles). Blythe is within 4 hours via car of 10% of the United States' population.

Blythe has a hot desert climate, featuring extremely hot summers and mild winters. There are an average of 179.3 days with highs of 90 °F (32.2 °C) or higher. There are an average of 3.1 days with lows of 32 °F (0 °C) or lower. Until 2016, the record high temperature was 122 °F (50 °C) on July 7, 1920, and June 24, 1929. But on June 20, 2016, that long-standing record was shattered when Blythe reached 124 °F (51.1 °C). The record low temperature was 20 °F (−6.7 °C) on January 8, 1971. There are an average of 17.9 days with measurable precipitation. The wettest year was 1992 with 9.16 inches (232.7 mm) and the driest year was 1950 with 0.31 inches (7.9 mm). The most rainfall in one month was 5.92 inches (150.4 mm) in August 1951, which included the 24-hour record rainfall of 3 inches (76.2 mm) on August 26.

Climate data for Blythe, California (Blythe Airport), 1991–2020 normals, extremes 1948–present
Month	Jan	Feb	Mar	Apr	May	Jun	Jul	Aug	Sep	Oct	Nov	Dec	Year
Record high °F (°C)	89 (32)	95 (35)	104 (40)	107 (42)	115 (46)	124 (51)	123 (51)	121 (49)	121 (49)	112 (44)	96 (36)	87 (31)	124 (51)
Mean maximum °F (°C)	78.0 (25.6)	82.7 (28.2)	92.5 (33.6)	101.3 (38.5)	107.4 (41.9)	114.8 (46.0)	117.2 (47.3)	115.6 (46.4)	111.3 (44.1)	101.6 (38.7)	89.5 (31.9)	76.8 (24.9)	118.4 (48.0)
Mean daily maximum °F (°C)	68.2 (20.1)	72.3 (22.4)	79.6 (26.4)	87.0 (30.6)	95.5 (35.3)	105.0 (40.6)	108.5 (42.5)	107.7 (42.1)	102.0 (38.9)	89.9 (32.2)	76.8 (24.9)	66.4 (19.1)	88.2 (31.3)
Daily mean °F (°C)	55.7 (13.2)	59.3 (15.2)	65.6 (18.7)	72.1 (22.3)	80.3 (26.8)	89.2 (31.8)	95.0 (35.0)	94.7 (34.8)	88.0 (31.1)	75.4 (24.1)	62.9 (17.2)	54.0 (12.2)	74.4 (23.5)
Mean daily minimum °F (°C)	43.2 (6.2)	46.2 (7.9)	51.6 (10.9)	57.3 (14.1)	65.2 (18.4)	73.4 (23.0)	81.5 (27.5)	81.7 (27.6)	74.0 (23.3)	61.0 (16.1)	49.1 (9.5)	41.7 (5.4)	60.5 (15.8)
Mean minimum °F (°C)	32.9 (0.5)	35.4 (1.9)	41.0 (5.0)	46.8 (8.2)	54.6 (12.6)	62.5 (16.9)	72.2 (22.3)	71.0 (21.7)	62.8 (17.1)	49.4 (9.7)	38.0 (3.3)	31.3 (−0.4)	29.6 (−1.3)
Record low °F (°C)	20 (−7)	22 (−6)	30 (−1)	38 (3)	43 (6)	46 (8)	62 (17)	62 (17)	53 (12)	27 (−3)	26 (−3)	24 (−4)	20 (−7)
Average precipitation inches (mm)	0.53 (13)	0.62 (16)	0.48 (12)	0.09 (2.3)	0.05 (1.3)	0.01 (0.25)	0.26 (6.6)	0.40 (10)	0.32 (8.1)	0.16 (4.1)	0.21 (5.3)	0.43 (11)	3.56 (89.95)
Average precipitation days (≥ 0.01 in)	2.6	2.6	2.3	0.8	0.5	0.2	1.5	1.5	1.6	1.2	1.2	1.9	17.9
Source 1: NOAA
Source 2: National Weather Service

=== Seismology ===
Despite California's reputation for earthquakes, according to geologists Blythe has not had an earthquake centered in the city for over 500,000 years.

== Local features ==
Tourism is a major component of the local economy. Blythe is a stopover city with full services for travelers between any of the nearby regions, in particular the major cities of Los Angeles and Phoenix, since it is approximately midway between those two metropolitan areas. The winter months bring visitors avoiding the colder climates of the north, when the population of the area within 50 miles (80 km) of Blythe has been known to exceed 500,000.

Blythe also contains 24 churches, one library, two newspapers (the Palo Verde Valley Times and The Desert Independent), two museums, two radio stations (KERU-FM and KJMB-FM), three banks, a three-screen movie theater (now closed), one funeral home and an 18,500 sq ft (1,720 m^{2}) recreation center. The area is popular with campers and hikers and has six parks, seven campgrounds, seven RV parks, three boat ramps onto the Colorado River, and an 18-hole public golf course.

== Demographics ==
Historical population
Census	Pop.	Note	%±
1920	1,622		—
1930	1,020		−37.1%
1940	2,355		130.9%
1950	4,089		73.6%
1960	6,023		47.3%
1970	7,047		17.0%
1980	6,805		−3.4%
1990	8,428		23.9%
2000	12,155		44.2%
2010	20,817		71.3%
2020	18,317		−12.0%
U.S. Decennial Census

=== Racial and ethnic composition ===
Blythe city, California – Racial composition Note: the US Census treats Hispanic/Latino as an ethnic category. This table excludes Latinos from the racial categories and assigns them to a separate category. Hispanics/Latinos may be of any race.
Race (NH = Non-Hispanic)	2020	2010	2000	1990	1980
White alone (NH)	23.9% (4,376)	28.3% (5,894)	42% (5,105)	44.4% (3,738)	54.3% (3,654)
Black alone (NH)	11% (2,007)	14.5% (3,020)	8% (972)	7.8% (657)	7.1% (476)
American Indian alone (NH)	0.9% (158)	0.7% (147)	0.9% (104)	0.8% (65)	0.2% (16)
Asian alone (NH)	1.7% (305)	1.4% (291)	1.3% (157)	0.5% (46)	0% (0)
Pacific Islander alone (NH)	0.1% (21)	0.1% (25)	0.2% (19)		
Other race alone (NH)	0.4% (65)	0.8% (164)	0.1% (17)	0.2% (13)	0.2% (11)
Multiracial (NH)	2.8% (512)	1% (208)	1.7% (210)	—	—
Hispanic/Latino (any race)	59.4% (10,873)	53.2% (11,068)	45.8% (5,571)	46.4% (3,909)	38.3% (2,577)

=== 2020 census ===
As of the 2020 census, Blythe had a population of 18,317. The population density was 689.0 inhabitants per square mile (266.0/km^{2}). The census reported that 66.0% of residents lived in households, 0.6% lived in non-institutionalized group quarters, and 33.4% were institutionalized.

The median age was 36.9 years. 18.4% of residents were under the age of 18 and 9.2% were 65 years of age or older. For every 100 females there were 198.6 males, and for every 100 females age 18 and over there were 230.7 males age 18 and over.

61.6% of residents lived in urban areas, while 38.4% lived in rural areas.

There were 4,477 households, of which 37.9% had children under the age of 18 living in them. Of all households, 36.8% were married-couple households, 8.3% were cohabiting couple households, 32.1% had a female householder with no spouse or partner present, and 22.8% had a male householder with no spouse or partner present. About 27.5% of households were made up of individuals and 9.9% had someone living alone who was 65 years of age or older. The average household size was 2.7. There were 2,980 families (66.6% of all households).

There were 5,246 housing units at an average density of 197.3 units per square mile (76.2 units/km^{2}), of which 14.7% were vacant. Of the 4,477 occupied units, 51.2% were owner-occupied and 48.8% rented. The homeowner vacancy rate was 2.2% and the rental vacancy rate was 6.7%.

Racial composition as of the 2020 census
Race	Number	Percent
White	5,796	31.6%
Black or African American	2,149	11.7%
American Indian and Alaska Native	327	1.8%
Asian	329	1.8%
Native Hawaiian and Other Pacific Islander	32	0.2%
Some other race	7,667	41.9%
Two or more races	2,017	11.0%

=== 2023 estimates ===
In 2023, the US Census Bureau estimated that 17.7% of the population were foreign-born. Of all people aged 5 or older, 55.2% spoke only English at home, 41.0% spoke Spanish, 1.8% spoke other Indo-European languages, 1.4% spoke Asian or Pacific Islander languages, and 0.6% spoke other languages. Of those aged 25 or older, 69.7% were high school graduates and 8.9% had a bachelor's degree.

The median household income was $51,984, and the per capita income was $18,378. About 15.4% of families and 19.5% of the population were below the poverty line.

== Politics ==
United States presidential election results for Blythe, California
Year	Republican		Democratic		Third party(ies)	
Year	No.	%	No.	%	No.	%
2000	1,278	48.34%	1,285	48.60%	81	3.06%
2004	1,812	55.93%	1,395	43.06%	33	1.02%
2008	1,681	50.18%	1,597	47.67%	72	2.15%
2012	1,544	47.19%	1,660	50.73%	68	2.08%
2016	1,560	48.83%	1,473	46.10%	162	5.07%
2020	2,046	53.38%	1,694	44.20%	93	2.43%
2024	2,041	58.72%	1,355	38.98%	80	2.30%

In the California State Legislature, Blythe is in the 18th senatorial district, represented by Democrat Steve Padilla, and in the 36th Assembly district, represented by Republican Jeff Gonzalez.

In the United States House of Representatives, Blythe is in California's 25th congressional district, represented by Democrat Raul Ruiz.

== Sports ==
The Blythe Heat was a winter professional minor league baseball team of the Arizona Winter League, and also a member of the Arizona Summer League, but the leagues folded in 2017. They played on Alexander Field in Todd Park. Some games of the Lake Havasu Heat (folded in 2009) of the semi-pro Pacific Southwest Baseball League played in Blythe during the summer months.

== Public services ==
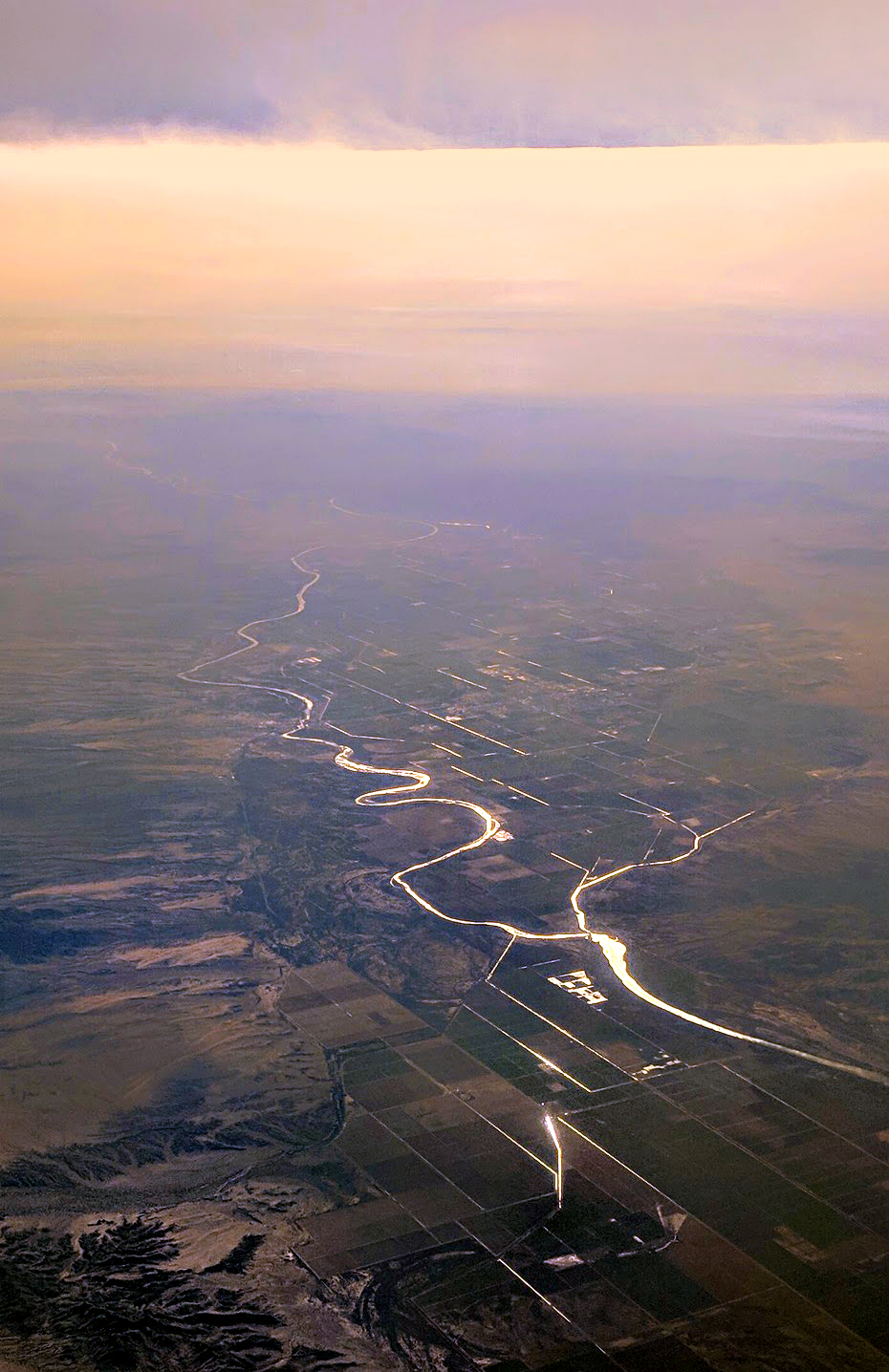
Aerial view from the north of the Colorado River on the Arizona–California border, showing the small Palo Verde Diversion Dam that diverts water to the west (right) into the main canal to irrigate the Palo Verde Valley around Blythe. Canals on the Arizona side (left) in the Parker Valley are also visible, in the foreground.

=== State and federal agencies ===
State facilities in the town include the following:

- Resources Agency, California Department of Fish and Game office at 150 S. Main Street.
- California Highway Patrol office at 430 S. Broadway Street.
- California Department of Motor Vehicles office at 430 S. Broadway Street.
- California Department of Food and Agriculture office.
- California Department of Corrections and Rehabilitation – Chuckawalla Valley State Prison(Now Closed)
- California Department of Corrections and Rehabilitation – Ironwood State Prison
- California Department of Forestry and Fire Protection

Federal facilities in the town include the following:

- U.S. Border Patrol
- U.S. Department of Agriculture – Blythe Federal Building
- U.S. Postal Service – Blythe Federal Building

=== Safety ===
Blythe has its own police department and volunteer fire department. The Riverside County Sheriff's Department also has a regional station in Blythe.

Emergency medical services are provided by American Medical Response, which staffs two paramedic ambulances in the city 24 hours a day.

Blythe has its own police department, the Blythe Police Department who patrol Blythe. However the highways in and around Blythe are managed by California Highway Patrol and the nearby Riverside County patrolled by Riverside County Sheriff's Department who also run the county jail.

=== Education ===
Blythe area public elementary and secondary schools comprise the Palo Verde Unified School District, which contains 3 elementary schools and 1 high school, and continuation/adult education school. Palo Verde Community College District is part of the California Community College system and includes Palo Verde College in Blythe and an educational center in Needles.

=== Transportation ===
Interstate 10 crosses Blythe in an east–west direction. State Route 78's eastern terminus is west of the town. U.S. Route 95 crosses Blythe in the eastern side. Lovekin Boulevard and Midland Road serve the ghost town of Midland.

Blythe Airport (BLH) is just west of the town on Interstate 10 and has a 6,500-foot (2,000 m) runway.

Blythe was served in rail by the Arizona and California Railroad but currently has no rail service since an embargo in late 2007 and abandonment in 2009.

Blythe is served by RidePV. Greyhound stops in Blythe.

=== Healthcare ===
Health facilities in Blythe include Palo Verde Hospital, a General Acute Care Hospital with 55 total beds and 24-hour standby emergency services, 23 physicians/surgeons, 2 dentists, 2 optometrists, 1 chiropractor, and 1 podiatrist.

=== Cemetery ===
The Palo Verde Cemetery District maintains the Palo Verde Cemetery.

== See also ==
- Blythe Intaglios
- Blythe Photovoltaic Power Plant
- Blythe Solar Power Project
