= Attorney General Hart =

Attorney General Hart may refer to:

- Augustus L. Hart (1849–1901), Attorney General of California
- Richard Hart (Jamaican politician) (1917–2013), Attorney General of Grenada
- William H. H. Hart (1848–1903), Attorney General of California

== See also ==
- General Hart (disambiguation)
