= Blythe Intake =

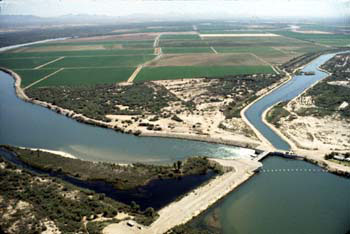
- Palo Verde Dam site of the Blythe Intake

- Location within California
- 33°43′54″N 114°30′57″W
- Location: Palo Verde Dam

History
- Built: 1887

California Historical Landmark
- Designated: March 1, 1982
- Reference no.: 948

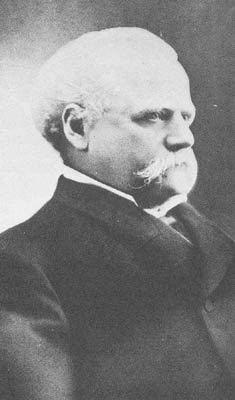
Thomas Henry Blythe

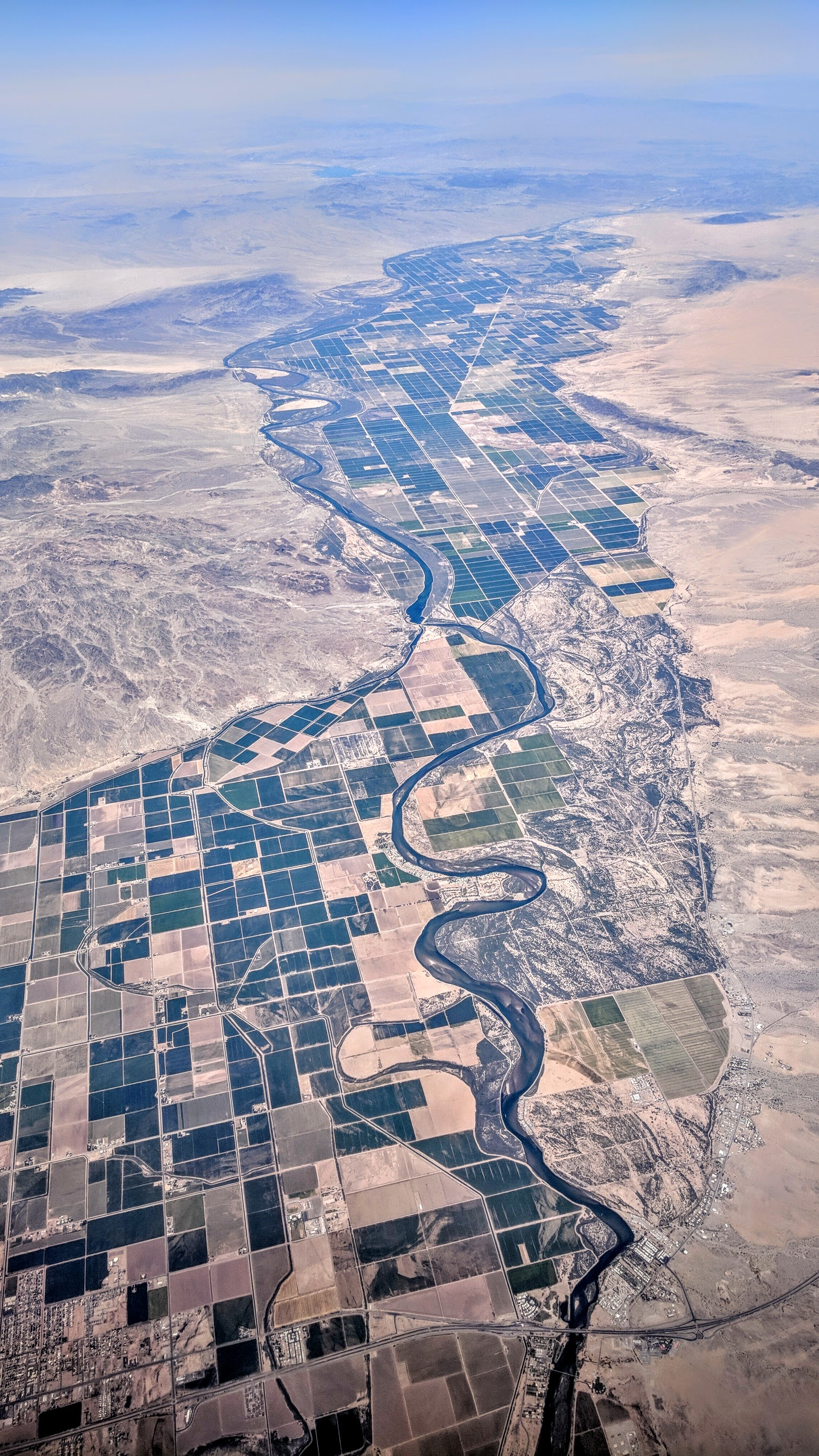
Palo Verde Valley aerial

The Blythe Intake is the place of the first irrigation canal to feed water to the Palo Verde Valley in 1877. It is located just north of Blythe, California in Riverside County, California. The Blythe Intake was designated a California Historic Landmark (No.948) on March 1, 1982. The site of the Blythe Intake is currently at the Palo Verde Dam.

In the early or mid-1870s, William Calloway (known as Oliver Calloway in some sources), an engineer and a former captain of the 1st California Infantry Regiment, explored an area across the Colorado River from Ehrenberg, Arizona and found its potential for development. Calloway made preliminary surveys and filed land claims under the Swamp Land Act of 1850. He interested the wealthier Thomas Henry Blythe (1882-April 4, 1883), born Thomas Williams in Mold, Wales, to undertake development and settlement of an "empire" located next to the Colorado. On July 17, 1877, Blythe filed his first claim for Colorado River water on what was to become the "Blythe Intake". Blythe appointed another man named George Irish as manager to assist Calloway in building an irrigation system. Calloway died in a Chemehuevi attack on March 28, 1880, and was replaced by C.C. Miller, the father of Frank Augustus Miller. Thomas Blythe died on April 4, 1883; his only revisit to the valley was in November 1882.

The Blythe Intake feed water to the Palo Verde Valley which is located in the Lower Colorado River Valley, next to the eastern border of Southern California with Arizona, United States. It is located on the Colorado Desert within the Sonoran Desert south of the Parker Valley. Most of the valley is in Riverside County, with the southern remainder in Imperial County. La Paz County borders to the east on the Colorado River. The Palo Verde Valley is part of the Sonoran Desert's Colorado Desert. The Big Maria Mountains are north of the valley, and the Colorado River forms the valley's boundaries to the east and south. Other mountains nearby are the McCoy Mountains to the west (north in Interstate 10), the Chocolate Mountains to the south, the Little Maria Mountains to the northwest, and the Dome Rock Mountains to the east.

== Marker ==
A California Historical Landmark is located is on U.S. Route 95 at milepost 10.5, on the right when traveling north. Marker on the site reads:

- NO. 948 SITE OF - On July 17, 1877, Thomas Blythe, a San Francisco financier, filed the first legal claim for Colorado River water rights. Oliver Callaway planned a diversion dam and canal which opened in 1877 to irrigate the Palo Verde Valley. This made possible the settlement and development of the valley.

== See also ==
- California Historical Landmarks in Riverside County, California
