= Palo Verde Intake =

Locale in La Paz County, Arizona, and Riverside County, California, United States

Palo Verde Intake is a locale in La Paz County, in the U.S. state of Arizona, stretching into Riverside County in the U.S. state of California. It is the intake for the Palo Verde Dam.
