= Thomas Henry Blythe =

Welsh-born American businessman (1822-1883)

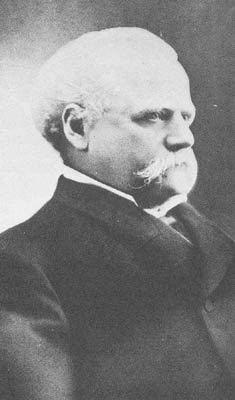
- Born: Thomas Henry Williams; July 30, 1822; Mold, Flintshire, Wales
- Died: April 4, 1883 (aged 60); San Francisco, California, U.S.
- Burial place: Woodlawn Memorial Park Cemetery, Colma, San Mateo County, California; 37.680°N 122.467°W
- Monuments: City of Blythe, California
- Occupation: Capitalist
- Known for: Obtaining primary water rights to the lower Colorado River, and using that water to develop the Palo Verde Valley in eastern Southern California, and leaving an unsettled estate worth millions of dollars that became a sensational story over 25 years with numerous competing claims filed.

Thomas Henry Blythe (born Thomas Williams; (Note: Thomas Blythe's birthname is disputed. Some sources believe he was born Thomas Henry Blythe in Liverpool, Lancashire, England, and that he used the name Thomas Williams only once, on his first trip to the United States.) July 30, 1822 – April 4, 1883), was a Welsh-born American businessman; he became a successful self-made capitalist and tycoon after emigrating to San Francisco in the United States. Blythe is most remembered for purchasing, developing, and subdividing the Palo Verde Valley in southern California, and obtaining primary rights to Colorado River water to irrigate the valley. The city of Blythe, California, the largest city in the Palo Verde Valley, is named for him.

== Biography ==
"The Strange Effects of Coffe(e)y in the Blythe Case," a cartoon by Charles W. Saalburg published in The Wasp depicting William H. H. Hart and other attorneys with a bag of money following judge James V. Coffey's ruling in Blythe's estate, August 16, 1890

Blythe was born on July 22, 1822, in Mold, Flintshire, Wales.

The city of Blythe, California, the largest city in the Palo Verde Valley, is named for him.

Blythe died in San Francisco on April 4, 1883 at the age of 60. At the time of Blythe's death his estate was estimated to be worth around four million dollars. He died suddenly and unexpectedly, without any family in the United States, and without a will or other instructions regarding his estate. He had informed his attorney, William H. H. Hart, of the existence of an illegitimate daughter, Florence, in England, and had requested Hart draft papers for adoption. Almost 200 people initially claimed to be his legitimate heirs, including three women each professing to be his wife. Litigation of the estate spanned more than 25 years, but ultimately the entire estate was awarded to Blythe's daughter, Florence, by judge James V. Coffey in a 125,000-word decision.

== Honors and tributes ==
- The city of Blythe, California, originally named Blythe City by Blythe himself, still bears his name.
- Other places and organizations bearing Thomas Henry Blythe's name:
  - Blythe Airport
  - Blythe Heat
  - Blythe Intaglios
  - Blythe Intake
  - Blythe Mesa Solar Power Project
  - Blythe Photovoltaic Power Plant

== See also ==
- Colonia Lerdo
