= Arthur Morrow Lewis =

American lecturer and writer

Arthur M. Lewis
- Lewis, circa 1910
- Born: 1873; Scotland
- Died: August 22, 1922 (Aged 49); Chicago, Illinois, U.S.
- Occupations: Lecturer, writer
- Known for: Workers' University lyceum (Chicago)
- Notable work: Evolution, Social and Organic (1908)
- Political party: Socialist Party of America
- Spouse: Lena Morrow Lewis

Arthur Morrow Lewis (1873 – August 22, 1922) was a prominent American socialist writer and lecturer. While he toured and spoke on behalf of the Socialist Party of America, Lewis conducted regular public lectures and debates on Sunday afternoons in Chicago from 1907 until the time of his death, for which he gained some prominence. Lewis also wrote a number of books and pamphlets for Chicago socialist publisher Charles H. Kerr & Co., including one particularly popular title on natural science which went through 10 printings.

Arthur Morrow Lewis was briefly married to Lena Morrow Lewis, a prominent traveling socialist lecturer and women's rights advocate in her own right.

== Biography ==
=== Early years ===
Arthur Lewis was born in Scotland in 1873. He worked first as an iron moulder before emigrating to the United states in 1898. He initially settled in California, making San Francisco his base of operations as he toured the Pacific coast as a lecturer, speaking on behalf of the Socialist Party of America.

In 1903 Lewis married fellow socialist lecturer Martha "Lena" Morrow, an 1892 graduate of Monmouth College five years his senior, with the couple sharing the unhypenated name "Morrow Lewis" following their union. Their marriage proved to be a short one, lasting about two years before ending in divorce, with the two socialist agitators going their separate ways. Although his ex-wife continued to use the name "Morrow Lewis" for the rest of her life, Arthur typically used the name "Arthur M. Lewis" following the couple's divorce.

Lewis briefly made his home in Los Angeles, then a small city in Southern California, before making his way to the metropolis of Chicago in 1907, home of the Socialist Party and ground zero of the American workers' movement.

=== Chicago years ===
In Chicago, the skilled public speaker Lewis, working closely with the 27th Ward branch of the Socialist Party, established a regular lyceum program under the banner of the "Workers University Society." The president of the so-called Workers University was Dr. J. H. Greer, with Lewis acted as the director of the lecture courses. The Workers University Society rented the 1300 seat Garrick Theater and conducted meetings every Sunday afternoon for a season typically running from October through March.

Crowds frequently packed the venue to hear presentations on social problems of contemporary life, evolution and the discoveries of natural science, socialism, and other themes. The Workers University continued without interruption for the rest of Morrow's life, celebrating its fifteenth anniversary in the spring of 1922 with Lewis delivering a keynote speech on the successes and challenges associated with the venture over that period.

Also in Chicago, Lewis soon made the personal acquaintance of publisher Charles H. Kerr and authored a number of books and pamphlets for his Charles H. Kerr & Co., publisher of the monthly magazine International Socialist Review. Lewis' best-known work, Evolution, Social and Organic, went through 10 printings over the course of 6 years for the prominent socialist publisher.

Deeply involved with developments in the natural sciences and their impact on philosophy, Lewis launched a magazine called The Evolutionist in 1909. The magazine's run was short, terminating in 1910. Despite the publication's short duration, it was remembered as one of the first American Marxist scientific magazines.

Lewis' "Workers' University" had a close resemblance to a lecture lyceum series, with a succession of prominent speakers brought to his home venue to deliver orations on matters of public concern.

The 1300 seat Garrick Theater, located in the ground floor of the Schiller Building on Dearborn Street in Chicago. The building was razed in 1961 and is now a parking garage.

In 1915, Lewis brought Socialist Party icon Eugene V. Debs to the Garrick for an afternoon lecture. In booking the engagement with Debs' brother Theodore, Lewis noted that he could promise "an audience that will listen closely and appreciate the arguments no matter how complex or difficult and that nobody will leave the theater until the last word is spoken." This he contrasted with way some audiences of the day "begin to tramp out after the enthusiasm of the reception has cooled." Lewis followed up the December 5 lecture by Debs with one by labor lawyer Clarence S. Darrow the following Sunday, with radical economics professor Scott Nearing following on January 30, 1916.

=== Death and legacy ===
In 1919, Lewis was stricken gravely ill, with close friends believing his death to be imminent. He managed to recover at the time, but the sickness left its mark, leaving Lewis gray and fail despite being in his normally virile middle-aged years.

Lewis died suddenly during the afternoon of August 22, 1922, while he was at the Midlothian Social Club, a Scottish social organization, in his hometown of Chicago.

At the time of his death, Lewis was eulogized radical journalist Harry Wicks in the fledgling Communist press:

"Starting life as an iron moulder, Arthur Morrow Lewis became a self-educated man; he never attended any university, he had no degrees, but he became a teacher of professors of universities. His was essentially a proletarian education in the best sense of the term.... He was the good friend of everyone who wanted to learn, especially the young people of the working class. And everywhere throughout the world can be found people who received their intellectual emancipation through attending the Garrick Theater lectures.

Pal of Jack London, he died, like London, a comparatively young man. London was just past 40 when he died in 1916 and Lewis was just 49. Both of them received their early training in the proletarian school of hard knocks and each of them in his own way struggled to throw off the age-long servitude of the under-dog by banishing fear and ignorance from the minds of mankind."

== Works ==
- Lewis-Harriman Debate: Socialist Party Vs. Union Labor Party: Simpson Auditorium, Los Angeles, California, [February 20, 1906]. With Job Harriman. [Los Angeles?]: Common Sense Publishing Co., 1906.
- Evolution, Social and Organic. Chicago, IL: Charles H. Kerr & Co., 1908.
- Vital Problems in Social Evolution. Chicago, IL: Charles H. Kerr & Co., 1911.
- Marx Versus Tolstoy: A Debate. With Clarence S. Darrow. Chicago, IL: Charles H. Kerr & Co., [1911].
- Ten Blind Leaders of the Blind. Chicago, IL: Charles H. Kerr & Co., 1912.
- An Introduction to Sociology. Chicago, IL: Charles H. Kerr & Co., 1912.
- Debate between Tom Mann and Arthur M. Lewis at the Garrick Theatre, Chicago, Illinois, Sunday, November 16, 1913. Chicago, IL: Charles H. Kerr & Co., 1914.
- The Struggle Between Science and Superstition. Chicago, IL: Charles H. Kerr & Co., 1916.
- The Art of Lecturing. Chicago, IL: Charles H. Kerr & Co., n.d.
- Debate on the Question: "Is 'Scientific Socialism' Scientific? With William F. Barnard. Girard, KS: Haldeman-Julius Publications, n.d. [c. 1950].(Debate took place in 1907)
- Lewis-Kennedy Debate on the Question: Is the Marxian Theory of Value Exploded? With John Curtiss Kennedy. Girard, KS: Haldeman-Julius Publications, n.d. [c. 1950]. (Debate took place in 1909)
