= William H. H. Hart =

American politician (1848–1918)

- Hart c. 1890

16th Attorney General of California
- In office January 8, 1891 – January 11, 1895
- Governor: Henry Markham
- Preceded by: George A. Johnson
- Succeeded by: William F. Fitzgerald

Personal details
- Born: January 25, 1848 Yorkshire, England
- Died: December 24, 1918 (aged 70) Palo Alto, California, U.S.
- Resting place: Cypress Lawn Cemetery
- Party: Republican
- Spouse: Loretta B. Hedden (m. 1874)
- Children: 1
- Education: Read law

Military service
- Allegiance: United States
- Branch/service: Union Army
- Years of service: 1862–1866
- Rank: Private
- Unit: Hinckley's Scouts; 44th Iowa Infantry Regiment; 147th Illinois Infantry Regiment
- Battles/wars: American Civil War; Battle of Fort Donelson; Battle of Shiloh; Siege of Vicksburg; Battle of Missionary Ridge (WIA); Battle of Nashville

William Henry Harrison Hart (January 25, 1848 – December 24, 1918) was an English American attorney and politician who served as the 16th attorney general of California from 1891 to 1895. During the American Civil War, he enlisted in the Union Army at the age of 13 and saw combat in several battles.

== Early life and military service ==
Hart was born in Yorkshire, England, on January 25, 1848. He was named for the American president William Henry Harrison. Hart immigrated to the United States with his parents in May 1852, settling in Illinois. In April 1856, he was kidnapped by Blackhawk Indians, but was "recovered" six months later. Soon after his family moved to Iowa, where his mother died in 1857 and his father in 1859. This "turbulent upbringing" gave him a "desire for danger" that, after the outbreak of the Civil War, led him to enlist in a scout company of the Union Army on January 23, 1862, two days before his fourteenth birthday. He fought at Fort Donelson, Shiloh, Vicksburg, Missionary Ridge and Nashville, and was wounded several times. He was honorably discharged in February 1866.

== Career ==
"The Strange Effects of Coffe(e)y in the Blythe Case," a cartoon by Charles W. Saalburg published in The Wasp depicting Hart and other attorneys with a bag of money following judge James V. Coffey's ruling in the estate of Thomas Henry Blythe, August 16, 1890

Hart was admitted to practice law in September 1868, and two years later became city attorney of DeWitt, Iowa. He came to California in 1873, settling in San Francisco to practice law. He was the Republican candidate for Attorney General in 1886, but was narrowly defeated despite outperforming the rest of the ticket. He campaigned on the construction of the San Francisco Belt Railroad, and was "instrumental" in its eventual passage by the State Legislature in 1889. In 1890, he ran again for Attorney General and was elected to a single four-year term, becoming the first foreign-born person to hold the office. During his tenure, he filed suit against the Southern Pacific Railroad and won $957,000 in unpaid taxes and control of the Oakland waterfront. He ran for Governor of California in 1894, but the Republican State Convention held that June nominated Morris M. Estee in a landslide.

Following the death of attorney and former governor Henry Huntly Haight in 1878, Hart took over as attorney for millionaire landowner Thomas Henry Blythe. Blythe died suddenly in 1883 and left no will, but prior to his death had informed Hart of the existence of an illegitimate daughter, Florence, in England, and had requested Hart draft papers for adoption. After Blythe's death, Hart found Florence and brought her to America to claim Blythe's $4 million estate in court. The trial between Florence and numerous other claimants finally began in July 1889 and lasted over a year, ending with judge James V. Coffey ruling in her favor in a 125,000-word decision. The case was appealed dozens of times to the California and United States Supreme Courts, with the matter finally settled in Florence's favor in April 1901.

During the mystery airship wave of 1896–97, Hart claimed to represent the inventor of an airship sighted in Sacramento, California, on November 17, 1896. He gave several vague, inconsistent interviews to the press describing the craft, its inventor, and its purposes, contradicting previous statements by George D. Collins, another attorney claiming to represent the inventor. Hart's most "sensational revelation" was that the inventor would use the airship to bomb Havana, Cuba, the nation in the midst of its war for independence from the Spanish Empire, on behalf of the U.S. government or Cuban revolutionaries.

== Personal life and death ==
Hart c. 1912

Hart married Loretta B. Hedden in DeWitt, Iowa, on September 10, 1874. They had one son, Lowell.

A victim of the Spanish flu pandemic, Hart died at his home in Palo Alto, California, on December 24, 1918. In the last months of his life, he had been testifying against the Southern Pacific in an oil lands case. He was buried at Cypress Lawn Cemetery in Colma, California.

== Legacy ==
In examining his role in the mystery airship wave, author Daniel Cohen characterized Hart as follows:

Like so many who wound up in San Francisco in the 1890s, Hart was a flamboyant character. If the stories he told about himself were to be believed, he had been a captive of the Blackhawk Indians for six months when he was eight years old. He had become a soldier when he was only fourteen, a lawyer at eighteen. Hart also claimed that he had received the highest fee ever paid a lawyer for a single case in the United States, and that he owned "the only mine in the world in which osmium is found in metal form."

— Daniel Cohen, The Great Airship Mystery: A UFO of the 1890s, 1981

== Works ==
=== Reports ===
- Report of the Attorney General of the State of California, 1891–1892. Sacramento: A. J. Johnston, Supt. State Printing. 1892.
- Special Report of the Attorney General of the State of California on Railroad Tax Cases and Railroad Taxation. Sacramento: A. J. Johnston, Supt. State Printing. 1893.
- Report of the Attorney General of the State of California, 1893–1894. Sacramento: A. J. Johnston, Supt. State Printing. 1894.

=== Articles ===
- The Right To Tax Unpatented Railroad Lands, and Government Lands for Which Land Office Receipts Have Been Issued. Sacramento: A. J. Johnston, Supt. State Printing. 1891.
- "An American Financial System; Broad Statesmanship Dictates a True National Policy". Fair Play. San Francisco. August 19, 1893.
- "Press of San Francisco Has Done Much Toward Upbuilding Our City". San Francisco: The Metropolis of the West. San Francisco: Western Press Association. 1910.

== Sources ==
- Cohen, Daniel (1981). The Great Airship Mystery. Dodd, Mead & Co. ISBN 0396079903.

Legal offices
Preceded by George A. Johnson	California Attorney General; 1891–1895	Succeeded by William F. Fitzgerald
