= John Lord Love =

American politician

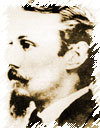

11th Attorney General of California
- In office December 8, 1871 – December 9, 1875
- Governor: Newton Booth; Romualdo Pacheco
- Preceded by: Jo Hamilton
- Succeeded by: Jo Hamilton

Personal details
- Born: March 17, 1841 Buffalo, New York, U.S.
- Died: July 7, 1899 (aged 58) San Francisco, California, U.S.
- Party: Republican

John Lord Love (March 17, 1841 – July 7, 1899) was a California Republican politician. He served as Assistant Attorney General and later Attorney General of California.

Love died at his home in San Francisco in 1899 after a period of illness.

Legal offices
Preceded by Jo Hamilton	Attorney General of California; 1871–1875	Succeeded by Jo Hamilton
