= Edward Neblett (politician) =

American Politician

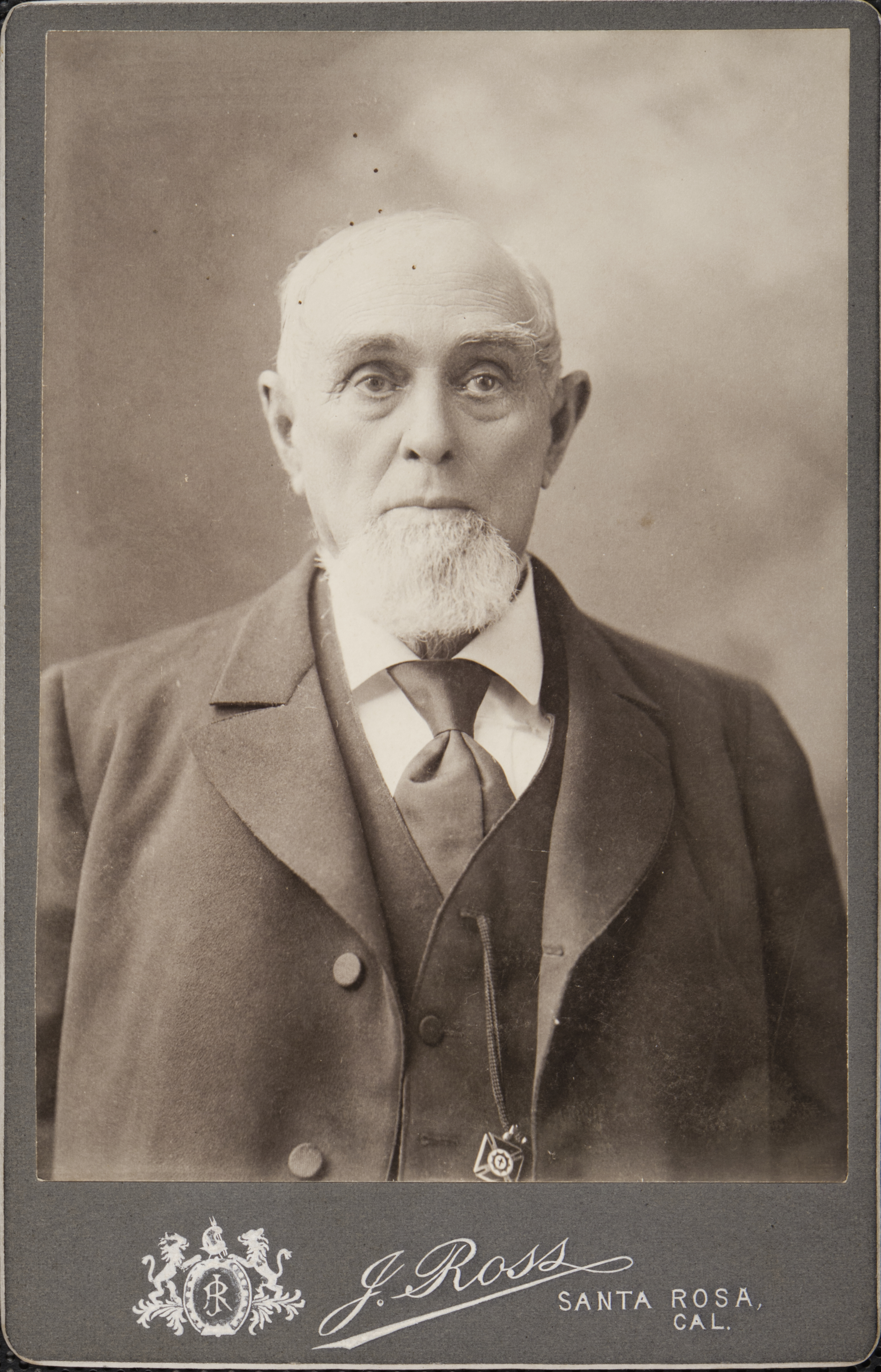
- Neblett in 1885

1st Mayor of Santa Rosa
- In office April 5, 1876 – April 5, 1878
- Preceded by: Office established
- Succeeded by: George A. Johnson

Member of the California State Assembly from the 21st district
- In office January 4, 1858 – January 3, 1859
- Preceded by: District established
- Succeeded by: Multi-member district

Sheriff of Trinity County, California
- In office 1855–1857
- Preceded by: William M. Lowe

Personal details
- Born: July 18, 1818 Prince George, Virginia, U.S.
- Died: January 19, 1907 (aged 88) Santa Rosa, California, U.S.
- Party: Whig (1857); Democratic (later)
- Spouse: Ann Jane McClary

Edward Neblett (July 18, 1818 – January 19, 1907) was an American businessman and politician who served as the first mayor of Santa Rosa, California from 1876 to 1878.

== Biography ==
Born in Prince George, Virginia, he moved to Cincinnati in 1834 and served as an apprentice to the hatters' trade under J. S. Bates & Co. He moved to Louisville, Kentucky in 1843, there engaging in mercantile pursuits, then travelled to California in 1849. He was selected Sheriff of Trinity County in 1854, and briefly served in the California Legislature from 1858 to 1859 as a Whig. He settled in Sonoma County in 1868, married Ann Jane McClary, and lived there until his death in 1907. He is interred in Santa Rosa Rural Cemetery.

Neblett was a Freemason and a member of the Knights Templar.
