= 1926 California lieutenant gubernatorial election =

- November 2, 1926
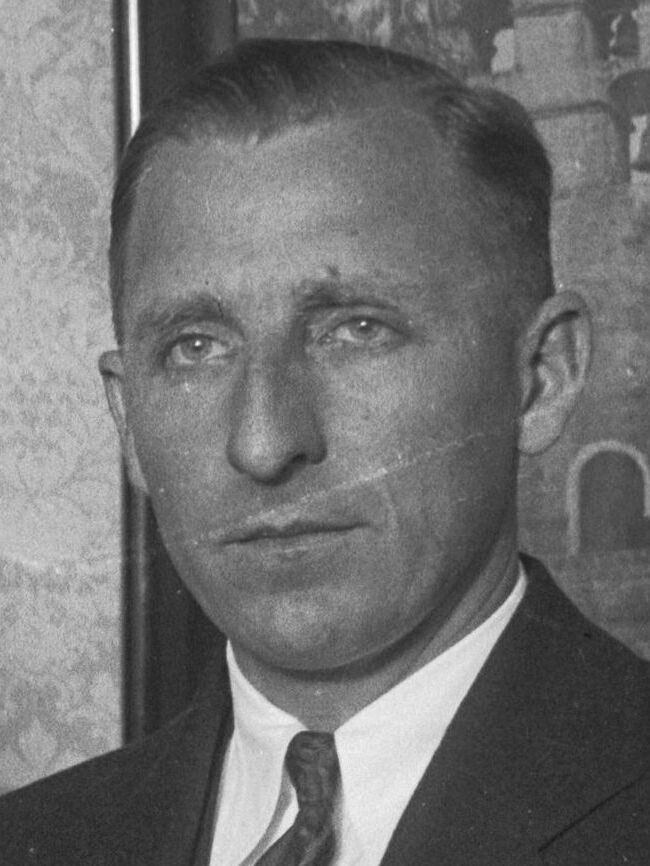

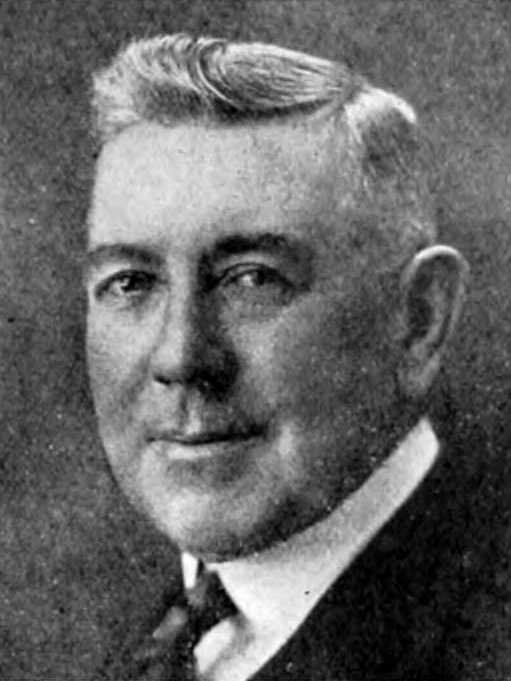

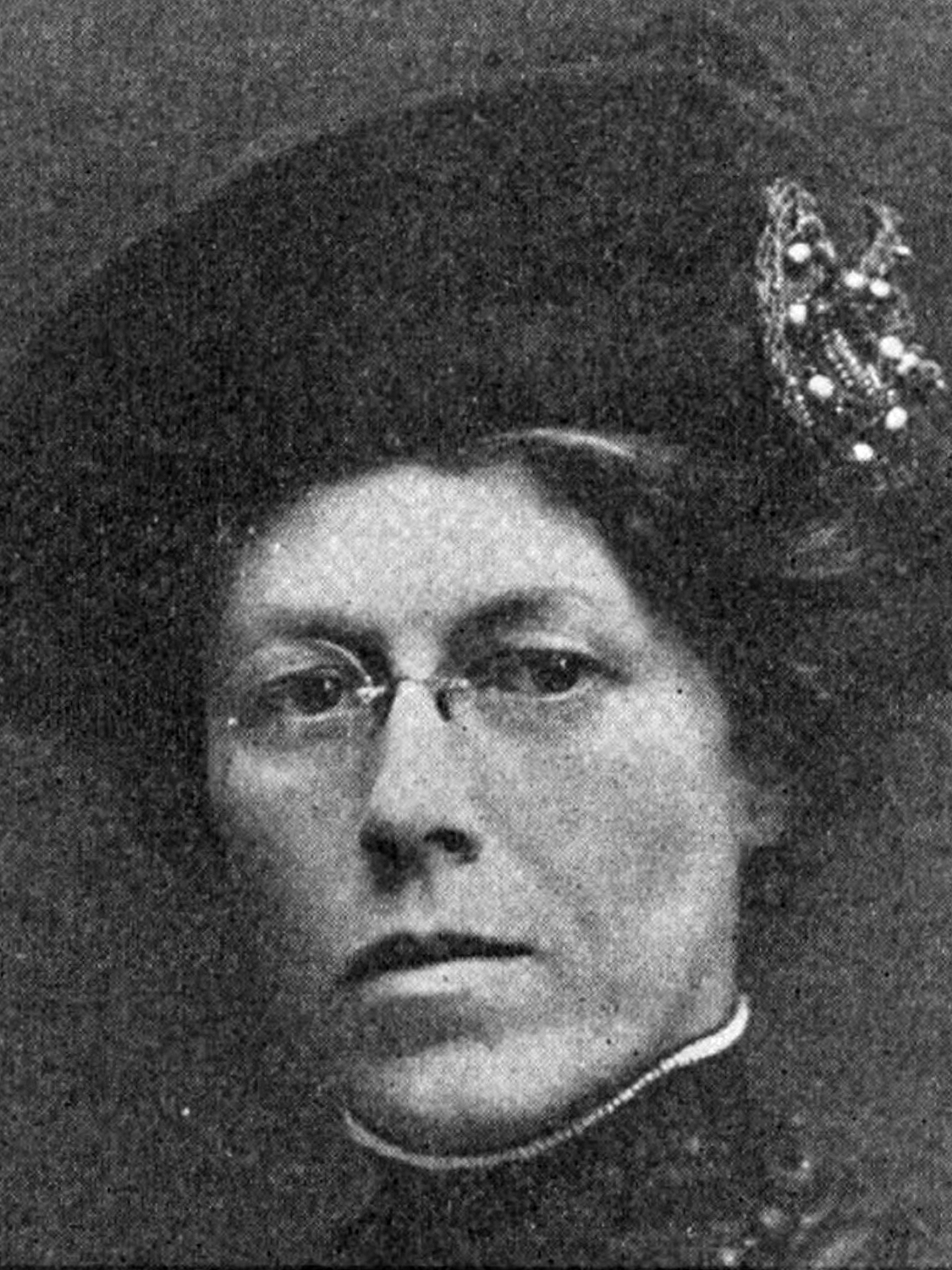
Nominee	Buron Fitts	Charles O. Dunbar	Lena Morrow Lewis
Party	Republican	Democratic	Socialist
Popular vote	818,519	204,091	56,506
Percentage	75.85%	18.91%	5.24%
- County results Fitts: 50–60% 60–70% 70–80% 80–90%
Lieutenant Governor before election
C. C. Young
Republican
Elected Lieutenant Governor
Buron Fitts
Republican

The 1926 California lieutenant gubernatorial election was held on November 2, 1926. Republican Deputy Los Angeles County District Attorney Buron Fitts defeated Democratic State Assemblyman Charles O. Dunbar with 75.85% of the vote.

== General election ==
=== Candidates ===
- Buron Fitts, Republican
- Charles O. Dunbar, Democratic
- Lena Morrow Lewis, Socialist

=== Results ===
1926 California lieutenant gubernatorial election
Party	Candidate	Votes	%	±%
Republican	Buron Fitts	818,519	75.85%	
Democratic	Charles O. Dunbar	204,091	18.91%	
Socialist	Lena Morrow Lewis	56,506	5.24%	
Majority		1,079,116		
Turnout				
Republican hold		Swing		
