= Natalie Rogers (politician) =

American politician and therapist

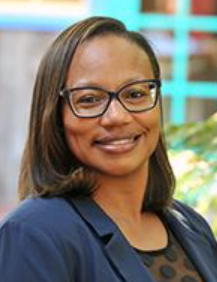
- Official portrait, 2025

Mayor of Santa Rosa, California
- In office December 13, 2022 – December 17, 2022
- Preceded by: Chris Rogers
- Succeeded by: Mark Stapp

Member of the Santa Rosa City Council for the 7th district
- Incumbent
- Assumed office December 11, 2020
- Preceded by: District established

Personal details
- Party: Democratic

Natalie Rogers is an American politician and therapist who served from 2022 to 2024 as the mayor of Santa Rosa, California, the fifth largest city in the San Francisco Bay Area. In 2020, she was elected the first Black female councilmember in Santa Rosa history, and was appointed the city's first Black mayor in 2022. She was reelected to the city council in 2024.

== Career ==
=== Politics ===
Elected to the newly created District 7 of the Santa Rosa City Council in 2020, Rogers became the first person to hold the office. In an election with exceptionally high voter turnout, she won by a margin of just 200 votes. It was her first run for public office of any kind. Upon election, she was selected by her colleagues to serve as vice mayor for a one-year term.

On December 13, 2022, Rogers' fellow Santa Rosa city councilmembers voted to appoint her as mayor for a two-year term, making her the first Black mayor of Santa Rosa. At the start of her term, she listed her priorities as infrastructure improvements, affordable housing, business recovery from the COVID-19 pandemic, and fiscal stability. Rogers was re-elected as city councilmember in November 2024.

In February 2025, Rogers announced she would be a candidate in the 2026 election for California's 2nd senatorial district, seeking to succeed the term-limited Mike McGuire, but withdrew in December of the same year.

=== Therapy ===
A licensed family and marriage therapist, Rogers has had her own private practice, has worked for Sonoma County, and has worked in mental health at Kaiser Permanente.

== Personal life ==
Rogers grew up in Marin County, California, living for a time in public housing. Her father was an operating engineer and union member, while her mother was a maintenance worker. Her sister died by suicide when Natalie was 15, leading her to pursue a degree in psychology at Sonoma State University. She moved to Santa Rosa after several years in Texas, and earned her master's degree and therapy license. She remarried in 2017 and has eight children in her blended family.
