= General Hart =

General Hart may refer to:

- Charles E. Hart (1900–1991), U.S. Army lieutenant general
- Franklin A. Hart (1894–1967), U.S. Marine Corps four-star general
- George Vaughan Hart (British Army officer) (1752–1832), British Army general
- Henry George Hart (1808–1878), British Army lieutenant general
- Herbert Hart (general) (1882–1968), New Zealand Military Forces brigadier general
- Reginald Hart (1848–1931), British Army general

== See also ==
- William Wright Harts (1866–1961), U.S. Army brigadier general
- Attorney General Hart (disambiguation)
