= Lena Morrow Lewis =

American orator and political organizer

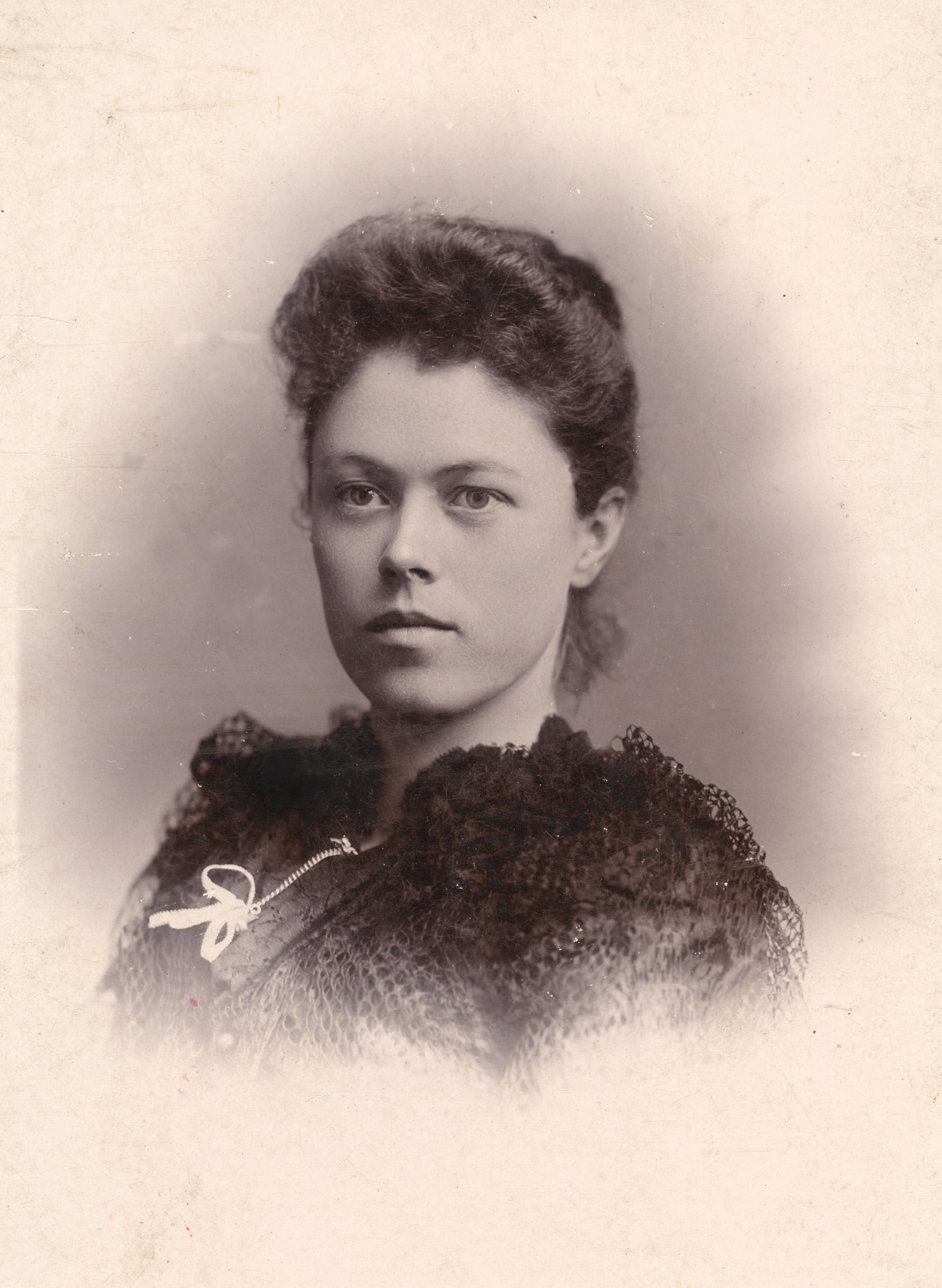
- Lena Morrow Lewis, 1892
- Born: December 1868; Warren County, Illinois
- Died: 1950 (aged 81–82)
- Education: Monmouth College, B.A.
- Known for: Activist
- Political party: Socialist Party of America; later, Social Democratic Federation

Martha Lena Morrow Lewis (1868–1950) was an American orator, political organizer, journalist, and newspaper editor. An activist in the prohibition, women's suffrage, and socialist movements, Lewis is best remembered as a top female leader of the Socialist Party of America during that organization's heyday in the first two decades of the 20th century and as the first woman to serve on that organization's governing National Executive Committee.

== Biography ==
=== Early years ===
Martha Lena Morrow was born in December 1868 in rural Warren County, Illinois where she was raised. She was the daughter of Rev. T. G. and Mary A. (Story) Morrow. Her father was a Presbyterian minister.

Morrow graduated from high school in Paxton, Illinois. Following the conclusion of her secondary education she enrolled in the Presbyterian-affiliated Monmouth College in Monmouth, Illinois, from which she graduated in 1892.

=== Early activism ===
Upon graduation from Monmouth College, she began her activist career. However, her involvement changed focus as she set new priorities.

For her first involvement, Morrow took a post as a national lecturer for the Women's Christian Temperance Union (WCTU), remaining in that position until 1898. During this period, she served as WCTU district president in Illinois.

In 1898, she took up the cause of women's suffrage, working as an organizer for the suffrage movement until 1901. She began working in South Dakota, then in 1900 she moved to Oregon. As a worker for women's suffrage, Morrow became the first female activist to work with the powerful labor union movement of Chicago in an effort to enlist its aid in bringing the vote to women.

=== Socialist Party lecturer ===
Lewis's travels on behalf of the Socialist Party took her as far north as Juneau, Alaska, as noted in this October 1914 election rally flyer.

"Downtrodden women, just listen to this and take heart! You are in reality superior to man, and if you hadn't been you could never have survived all the centuries of servitude and persecution that have been put upon you."

Morrow joined the Socialist Party of America (SPA) in 1902 and redirected her activism from women's suffrage to socialism. She was attracted to socialism's emphasis on fair working conditions. As she saw it, a man without a job was worse off than a woman without a ballot because a job was necessary for a livelihood. She chose California for her activism, working out of the San Francisco Bay Area.

In 1903, She took the name Lewis by a short-lived marriage to fellow Socialist Party lecturer Arthur Morrow Lewis. Her husband was born in England, studied for the ministry, and became a noted scholar. The next year, 1903, she was arrested in San Francisco for speaking on the streets and spent a few hours in jail.

Lena Morrow Lewis was indefatigable in promoting the Socialist Party as a national organizer and lecturer from 1908 to 1914. During that time she spoke in every state except for Mississippi, as well as headlining engagements in Canada and England. Her venues included lumber camps and mining districts as well as auditoriums and halls.

Lewis was a member of the Intercollegiate Socialist Society. She was elected to be a member the National Woman's Committee of the Socialist Party from California, serving from 1892 to 1898. In 1905, she was the first woman to be elected to the National Executive Committee of the Socialist Party. Lewis was later tapped for the American delegation to the 1910 International Socialist Congress in Copenhagen, Denmark.

Although best known for her speaking, Lewis was a prolific writer. Over 200,000 copies of her pamphlet, "The Socialist Party and Woman Suffrage", were distributed. She was a regular contributor to the Progressive Woman (originally the Socialist Woman).

Middle-aged and divorced, Lewis was in the power structure of the Socialist Party and stood as one of its "outstanding lecturers and organizers". However, in 1910–1911, Lewis became the target of scandal and calls for her resignation from the National Executive Committee because of her tryst with Socialist Party National Executive Secretary J. Mahlon Barnes. Although the scandal subsided, Lewis declined to run again and went to the Alaskan Territory as an organizer. There, she lived alone in a two-room cabin from 1913 to 1917. During her time in Juneau, Lewis taught, lectured, wrote, and campaigned. She was the editor of the Sunday Morning Post in Juneau for over two years as well as serving as co-editor of the state's official organized labor newspaper, Alaska Labor News.

=== Return to California ===
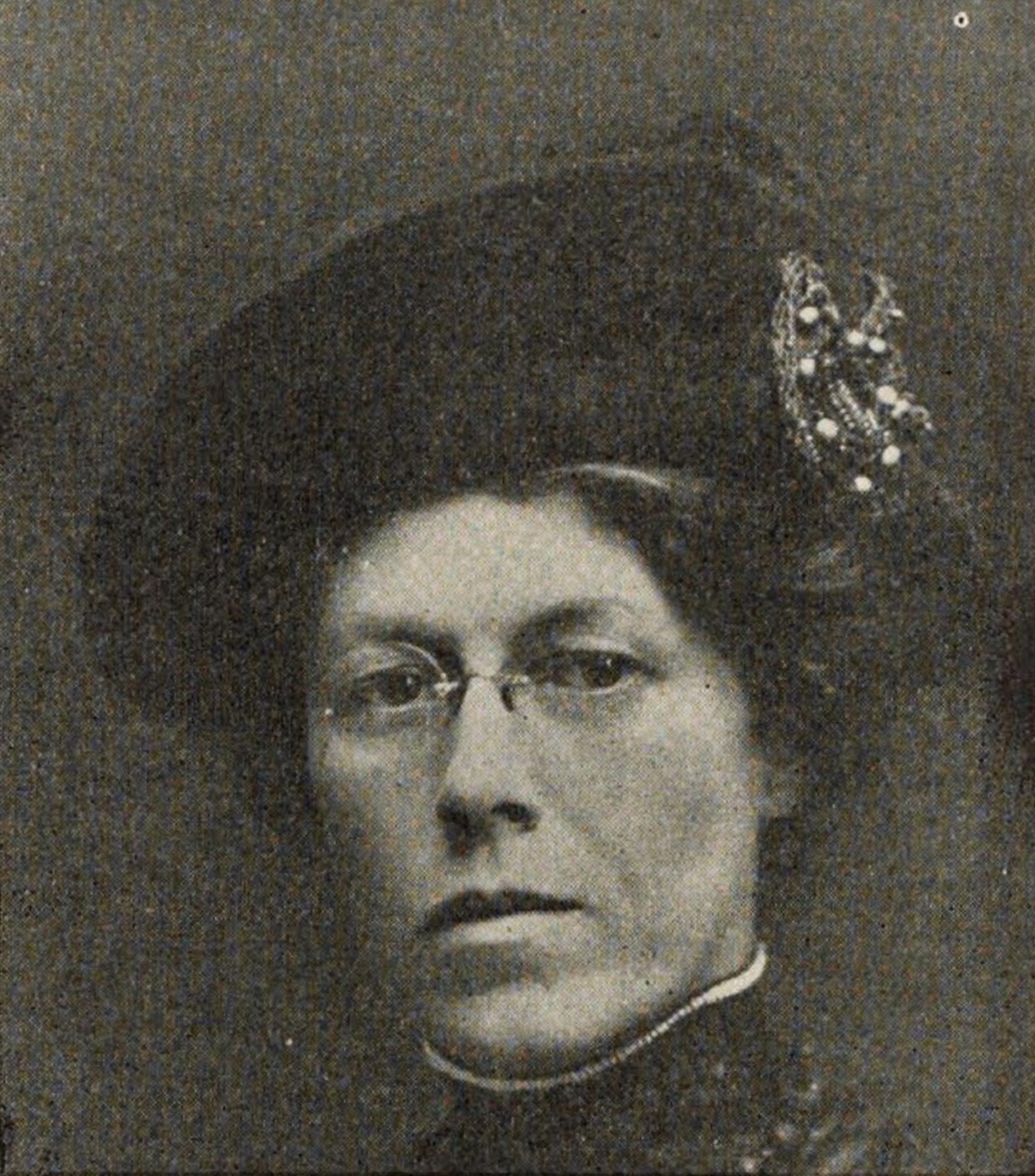
Lewis c. 1912

"Lena Morris Lewis is one of the noblest of women, as I have reason to know." Eugene V. Debs, 1922.

The 1920s found Lewis in San Francisco, California, and still active in the Socialist Party. She was the SPA's nominee for Lieutenant Governor of California in 1926, winning an impressive 56,000 votes in the race—more than 10,000 more than garnered by writer Upton Sinclair, the Socialist candidate for Governor. Lewis was also the nominee of the California Socialists for United States Senate in 1928.

Lewis was elected the State Secretary of the Socialist Party of California in 1925 and remained in that capacity until 1930, serving also during this time as editor of the Socialist Party newspaper Labor World. She also maintained an active membership in the Women's International League for Peace and Freedom and the League of Women Voters.

In 1931, Lewis was elected to the governing National Executive Committee of the Socialist Party of America.

Lewis resigned from the Socialist Party in 1936 to join the Social Democratic Federation (United States) which separated from the SPA over ideological disagreements. She spent her last years organizing the library of the Rand School of Social Science that had been founded to teach socialism.

=== Death and legacy ===
Lewis died in 1950. She was 81 years old at the time of her death. Although she had been in the top leadership of the Socialist party for most of her life, she did not write her memoirs. However, Lewis left many papers. They are housed at the Tamiment Library and Robert F. Wagner Archives, located at New York University in New York City. The Morrow collection consists of two linear feet of material in five archival boxes and has been microfilmed by the library for the use of scholars. A small collection of photographs of Lewis with her contemporaries in the socialist movement is also housed at NYU.

== Works ==
- The Socialist Party and Women Suffrage. Chicago: National Office of the Socialist Party, n.d. (1911).
- "The Materialist Basis of Education", The Masses, March 1912.
- Mission of the Social Democratic Federation. Washington, DC: Social Democratic Federation National Office, n.d. (c. 1936).
