= Jo Hamilton (politician) =

10th & 12th Attorney General of California
- In office December 9, 1875 – January 8, 1880
- Governor: William Irwin
- Preceded by: John Lord Love
- Succeeded by: Augustus L. Hart
- In office December 5, 1867 – December 8, 1871
- Governor: Henry Huntly Haight
- Preceded by: John G. McCullough
- Succeeded by: John Lord Love

District Attorney of Placer County, California
- In office 1862–1862
- In office 1860–1860

Personal details
- Born: April 7, 1827 Barren County, Kentucky, U.S.
- Died: August 4, 1904 (aged 77) Auburn, California, U.S.
- Spouse: Nancy Blair (m. 1849)
- Children: 5
- Occupation: Lawyer and politician

Jo Hamilton (April 7, 1827 – August 4, 1904) was a California lawyer and politician who served as Attorney General of California from 1867 to 1871 and again from 1875 to 1880. He also served as Trustee of the State Library, 1874–82.

Hamilton was born in Barren County, Kentucky and came to California in 1859 after being admitted to the bar in Georgia. Upon his arrival in California, Hamilton worked in the mines for a short time and initially practiced law at Yankee Jims, California. A pioneering lawyer of Placer County, California, Hamilton served as District Attorney in 1860 and again 1862. He was listed as a leading Democrat of California and was one of the best known lawyers of his time. After retiring, he continued to practice law in Auburn, Placer County. Jo Hamilton died at his home in Auburn on August 4, 1904.

Hamilton was married in 1849 to Nancy Blair, a native of Tennessee. They had five children. His wife, Nancy Hamilton, died just over a month following his death, on September 20, 1904. His son, George W. Hamilton, was a member of the California State Assembly for Placer County from 1893 to 1895.

Legal offices
| Preceded by John C. McCullough | Attorney General of California; 1867–1871 | Succeeded by John Lord Love |
| Preceded by John Lord Love | Attorney General of California; 1875–1880 | Succeeded by Augustus L. Hart |
