= George W. Wright =

American politician

George Washington Wright

Member of the U.S. House of Representatives from California's at-large district
- In office September 11, 1850 – March 3, 1851
- Preceded by: Established
- Succeeded by: Edward C. Marshall

Personal details
- Born: June 4, 1816 Concord, Massachusetts
- Died: April 7, 1885 (aged 68) Dorchester, Massachusetts
- Resting place: Sleepy Hollow Cemetery, Concord, Massachusetts
- Party: Republican (from 1856)
- Spouse: Mary G. Swain (m. 1844-1877, her death)
- Children: 2
- Occupation: Businessman; Attorney; Inventor

George Washington Wright (June 4, 1816 – April 7, 1885) was a California politician. He was the leading vote getter in a November 1849 at-large election for California's two seats in the United States House of Representatives following California's admission to the Union. He served a partial term in the 31st United States Congress (1850-1851).

== Biography ==
Wright was born in Concord, Massachusetts, on June 4, 1816, a son of Edward and Mary Wright. He was educated in Concord and in 1835 began to work in the business department of the Boston Courier newspaper. He later became a merchant, and in 1849 moved to San Francisco, California, where he continued his mercantile career and expanded into banking and mining. He was one of the founders of a bank, San Francisco's Palmer, Cook & Co.

In September 1850, California attained admission to the Union. Wright won election as an independent to one of the new state's two at-large seats in the U.S. House and served a partial term, September 11, 1850, to March 3, 1851. He declined to run for a full term and resumed his business interests. He then studied law and attained admission to the bar.

An ally of John C. Frémont from their time in California, in 1856 Wright joined the new Republican Party and supported Frémont for president. An inventor who worked on improvements to steam engines, during the American Civil War, Wright resided in Buffalo, New York, where he took part in construction of a ship for the United States Revenue Cutter Service, the USRC Commodore Perry.

Wright later moved to Washington, D.C., where he served as an attorney representing the interests of the Choctaw American Indian tribe. During the administration of President Andrew Johnson, Wright declined Johnson's appointment as United States Secretary of the Interior.

== Retirement and death ==
In 1880, Wright retired to Dorchester, Massachusetts. He died in Dorchester on April 7, 1885, and was buried at Sleepy Hollow Cemetery in Concord, Massachusetts.

== Family ==
In 1844, Wright married Mary G. Swain of Nantucket, Massachusetts. They were the parents of a son, William (1849-1849) and a daughter, Emma (1847-1900), the wife of Charles A. Hinckley of Boston.

U.S. House of Representatives
| New seat | Member of the U.S. House of Representatives from California's at-large congressional district 1850–1851 | Succeeded by Edward C. Marshall |
