= George A. Johnson =

American politician

- Engraving by H. B. Hall & Sons, 1889

15th Attorney General of California
- In office January 8, 1887 – January 8, 1891
- Governor: Washington Bartlett; Robert Waterman
- Preceded by: Edward C. Marshall
- Succeeded by: William H. H. Hart

Member of the California Senate from the 21st district
- In office January 8, 1883 – January 3, 1887
- Preceded by: W. W. Moreland
- Succeeded by: J. J. Sullivan

Delegate to the Second Constitutional Convention of California
- In office September 28, 1878 – March 3, 1879
- Preceded by: Office established
- Succeeded by: Office abolished
- Constituency: Sonoma

2nd Mayor of Santa Rosa
- In office April 5, 1878 – September 28, 1878
- Preceded by: Edward Neblett
- Succeeded by: T. J. Proctor

Personal details
- Born: George Ashbury Johnson; July 27, 1829 Salisbury, Maryland, U.S.
- Died: September 20, 1894 (aged 65) San Francisco, California, U.S.
- Resting place: Santa Rosa Memorial Park, Santa Rosa, California, U.S.
- Party: Democratic
- Spouse: Juliet Mary Wayman Johnson
- Children: 5
- Education: Yale College

George Ashbury Johnson (July 27, 1829 – September 20, 1894) was an American lawyer and politician who served as the 15th attorney general of California from 1887 to 1891. He previously served as the 2nd mayor of Santa Rosa from April to September 1878, as a delegate to California's Second Constitutional Convention from 1878 to 1879, and in the State Senate from 1883 to 1887. He is notable for litigating against the railroad companies and forcing them to pay taxes.

Before coming to California in 1874, Johnson resided in Indiana, where governor Thomas A. Hendricks appointed him judge of the Seventeenth Judicial Circuit Court of Indiana.

Legal offices
Preceded by Edward C. Marshall	Attorney General of California; 1887–1891	Succeeded by William H. H. Hart
