= Chris Rogers (politician) =

American politician

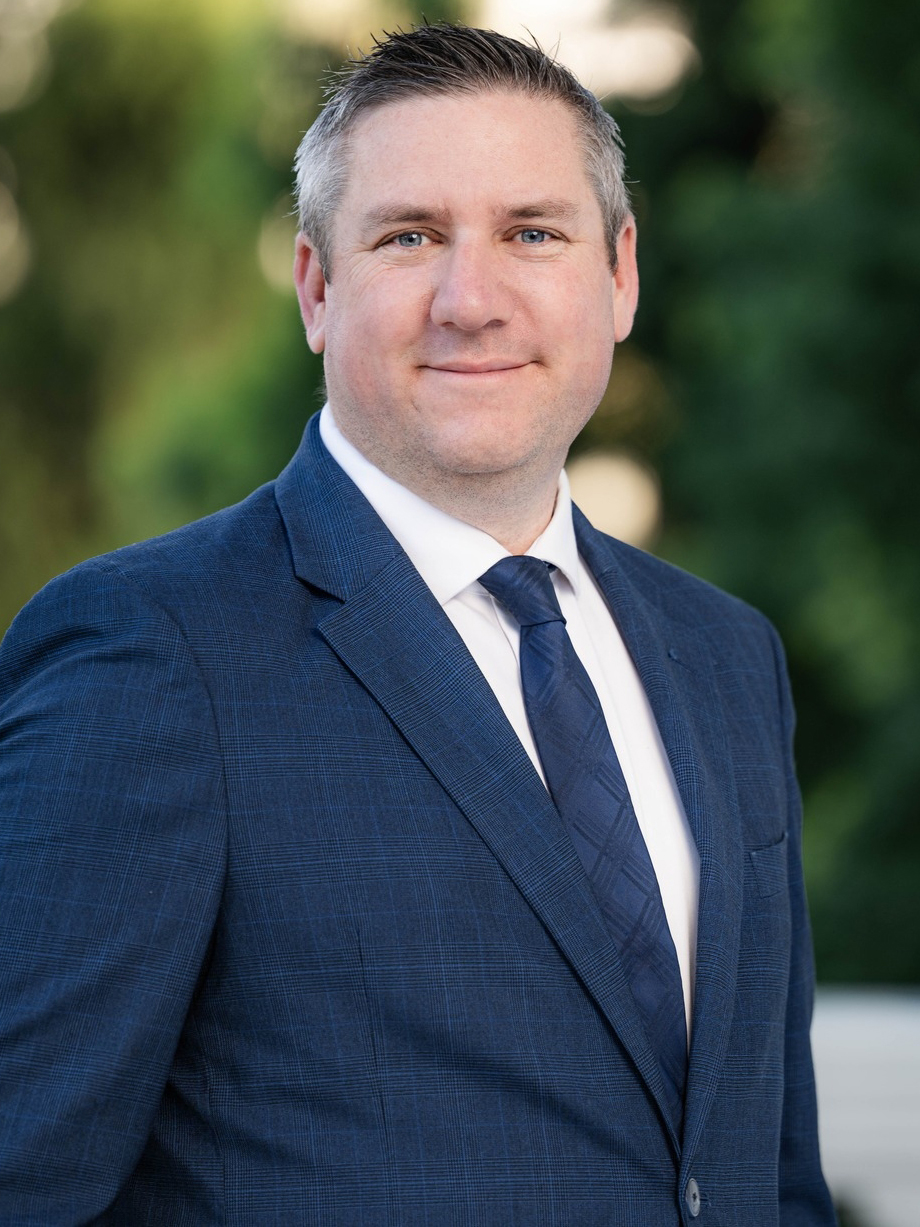
- Official portrait, 2024

Member of the California State Assembly from the 2nd district
- Incumbent
- Assumed office December 2, 2024
- Preceded by: Jim Wood

Mayor of Santa Rosa, California
- In office December 11, 2020 – December 13, 2022
- Preceded by: Tom Schwedhelm
- Succeeded by: Natalie Rogers

Member of the Santa Rosa City Council from the 5th District
- In office December 2016 – December 17, 2024

Personal details
- Born: Christopher John Rogers; September 16, 1987 (age 38) Sonoma County, California
- Party: Democratic
- Spouse: Sarah
- Education: University of California, Santa Barbara (BA); Sonoma State University (MPA)

Chris Rogers (born September 16, 1987) is an American politician who is a member of the California State Assembly for the 2nd district since December 2024.

== Early life and education ==
Rogers was born and raised in Sonoma County, California. He earned a Bachelors of Arts in political science from the University of California, Santa Barbara and a Masters in Public Administration from Sonoma State University.

== Political career ==
Rogers previously worked in the district office of U.S. Representative Lynn Woolsey and as a senior staffer for State Senator Mike McGuire.

=== Santa Rosa City Council ===
Rogers was first elected to the Santa Rosa City Council in 2016. He was re-elected in 2020 and was selected by the council to serve as mayor from December 2020 to December 2022.

=== California State Assembly ===
Following incumbent Jim Wood's retirement announcement, Rogers announced that he would run for the California State Assembly in the 2nd district in 2024. Rogers placed second in the primary, narrowly defeating California Democratic Party chair Rusty Hicks to advance. He defeated Republican Mike Greer in the general election with 65.9% of the vote to 34.1%.. His notable work has focused on trying to assist the ailing California wine industry, which is important for his district, by offering additional business opportunities, like additional tastings.

== Personal life ==
Rogers lives in Santa Rosa with his wife, Sarah, a nurse.

== Electoral history ==
=== Santa Rosa City Council ===
2016 Santa Rosa City Council election
Candidate	Votes	%
Jack Tibbetts	40,788	21.1
Julie Combs	38,628	20.0
Chris Rogers	35,019	18.1
Ernesto Olivares	33,776	17.5
Don Taylor	23,775	12.3
Brandi Asker	21,017	10.9
Total votes	193,003	100.0

2020 Santa Rosa City Council 5th district election
Candidate	Votes	%
Chris Rogers (incumbent)	5,790	68.3
Azmina R. Hanna	2,682	31.7
Total votes	8,472	100.0

=== California State Assembly ===
2024 California State Assembly 2nd district election
Primary election
Party	Candidate	Votes	%
Republican	Michael Greer	39,052	27.6
Democratic	Chris Rogers	27,291	19.3
Democratic	Rusty Hicks	25,962	18.3
Democratic	Ariel Kelley	19,740	14.0
Democratic	Frankie Myers	18,065	12.8
Democratic	Ted Williams	9,803	6.9
Democratic	Cynthia Click	1,575	1.1
Total votes		141,488	100.0
General election
Democratic	Chris Rogers	154,845	65.9
Republican	Michael Greer	80,290	34.1
Total votes		235,135	100.0
Democratic hold			
