= Mayor of Santa Rosa =

Chief executive of Santa Rosa

Mayor of the City of Santa Rosa
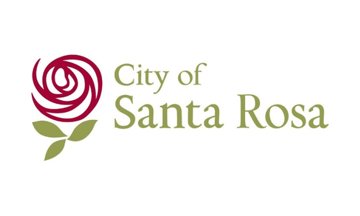
- Flag of Santa Rosa
- Incumbent; Mark Stapp since December 17, 2024
- Term length: Two years (renewable, non-consecutive)
- Inaugural holder: Edward Neblett
- Formation: 1876
- Salary: $13,772

The mayor of Santa Rosa is the executive head of the city of Santa Rosa, California. Under Santa Rosa's council–manager government, the mayor serves as presiding officer of the Santa Rosa City Council, while the city manager serves as administrative head of the city government. The mayor is elected by the council to a single two-year term. The city manager is also elected by the council, but is not term-limited.

== Powers of the mayor ==
Per the city charter, the mayor has the power and authority:

(a) To preside over meetings of the Council and to vote as a member of the Council.

(b) To establish the agendas for Council meetings with the assistance of the City Manager.

(c) To appoint committees of the Council and Council committee chairpersons.

(d) To appoint chairpersons of the City's boards, commissions, and committees with the approval of the majority of the Council.

(e) To deliver annually a state of the City address in which they articulate policy and vision for the City.

(f) To act as the ceremonial representative of the City and spokesperson of the City.

(g) To make appointments to all county, regional and state bodies on which the City is represented with the approval of the majority of the Council.

(h) To act as chief negotiator on behalf of the City with county, regional, state and federal bodies and agencies.

== Powers of the city manager ==
Per the city charter, the city manager has the power and duties:

(a) To see that all ordinances are enforced.

(b) To appoint, except as otherwise provided, all heads of departments, subordinate officials and employees, and remove the same except as otherwise herein provided, and have general supervision and control over the same.

(c) To serve as Director of Emergency Services, responsible for controlling and directing the effort of the emergency organization of the City in response to actual or threatened conditions of disaster or of extreme peril to the safety of persons and property within the City.

(d) To exercise general supervision over all privately owned public utilities operating within the City so far as the same are subject to municipal control.

(e) To see that the provisions of all franchises, permits and privileges granted by the City are fully observed and report to the Council any violations thereof.

(f) To act as purchasing agent for the City, except for the Board of Public Utilities, unless requested by such board.

(g) To attend all meetings of the Council unless excused therefrom by the Council or the Mayor.

(h) To examine or cause to be examined, without notice, the conduct of any appointed officer or employee of the City.

(i) To keep the Council advised as to the needs of the City.

(j) To devote their entire time to the interests of the City.

(k) To have general supervision of all the public parks and playgrounds of the City.

(l) To appoint such advisory boards as they may deem desirable to advise and assist the work of the City Manager, provided such boards shall not receive any compensation.

== List of mayors ==
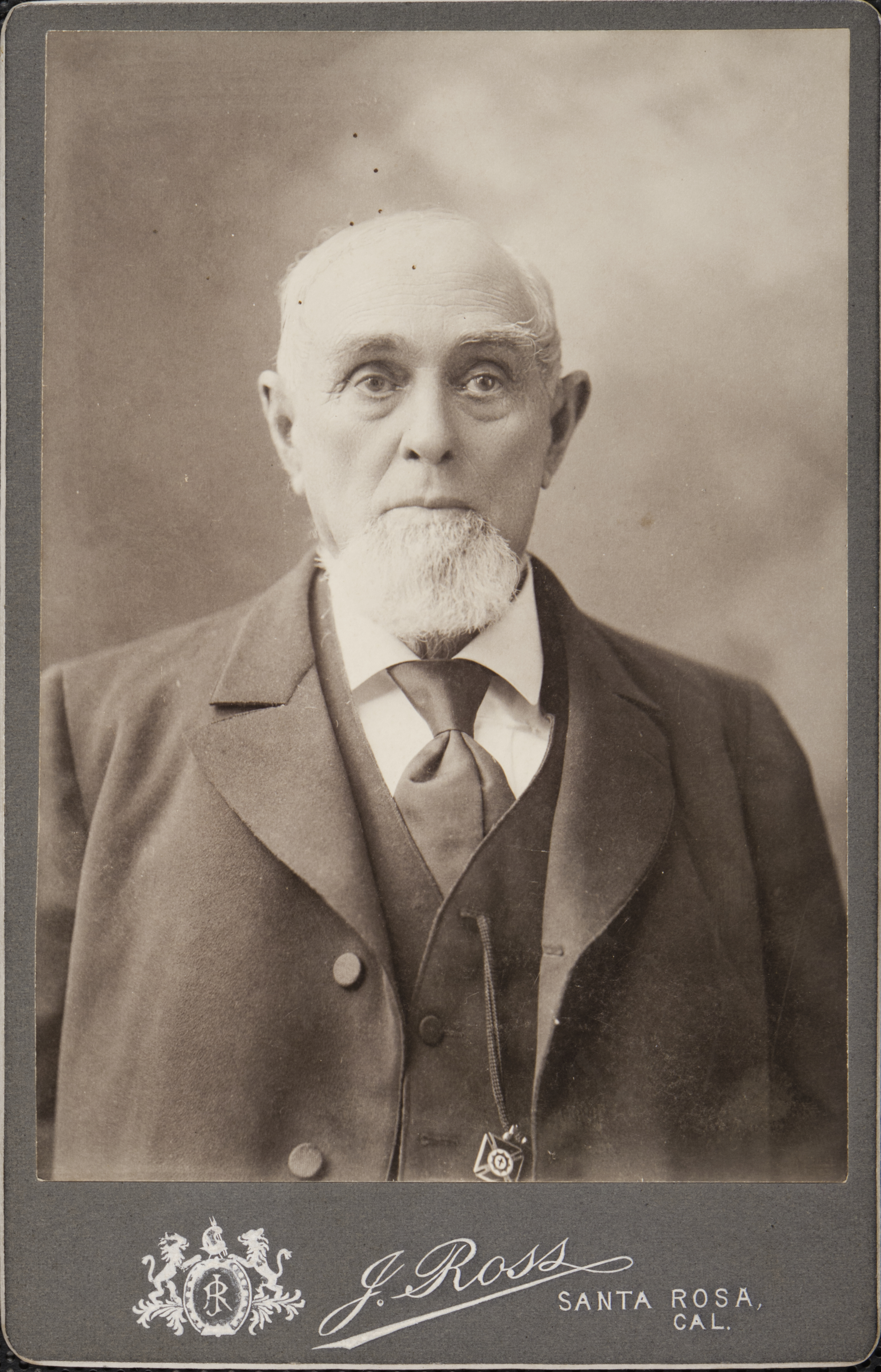
Edward Neblett in 1885. He was the first mayor of Santa Rosa, serving from April 5, 1876 to April 5, 1878.

1876–1878: Edward Neblett
1878: George A. Johnson
1878–1880: T. J. Proctor
1880–1884: James P. Clarke
1884–1886: Thomas Rutledge
1886–1888: A. P. Overton
1888–1889: H. P. Byington
1889–1890: J. F. Smith
1890–1892: T. J. Brooke
1892–1896: E. F. Woodward
1896–1898: J. W. Jesse
1898–1902: James S. Sweet
1902–1904: M. J. Bower
1904–1908: John P. Overton (first term)
1908–1910: James H. Gray
1910–1912: James R. Edwards
1912–1914: Jack L. Mercier
1914–1916: Charles E. Lee
1916–1920: James C. Mailer
1920–1922: W. E. Rutherford
1922–1924: Lawrence Adam Pressley
1924: Newton B. Kinley
1924–1926: Charles O. Dunbar
1926–1928: John P. Overton (second term)
1928–1938: George R. Cadan
1938–1942: Robert Madison (first term)
1942–1944: Ernest A. Eymann
1944–1946: Robert Madison (second term)
1946–1948: Obert Pederson
1948–1949: James M. Daw
1949–1950: Robert L. Bishop
1950–1951: Ward H. von Tillow
1951–1952: Jerome M. Kushins
1952–1953: Alex McCluskey
1953–1954: Leon Reynaud
1955–1956: Karl F. Stolting
1956–1957: Holgar A. Jensen
1957–1958: Kenneth R. Mitchell
1958–1959: Charles P. Toohey
1959–1960: Jack Ryerson
1960–1961: James Logan Smith
1961–1962: Alan M. Charvoz
1962–1963: Charles P. Toohey
1963–1964: Jack Ryerson
1964–1965: Robert Tuttle
1965–1966: Charles Le Menager
1966–1967: Charles DeMeo
1967–1968: Hugh B. Codding
1968–1969: Louis E. Meyers
1969–1970: Jack Ryerson
1970–1971: Gerald M. Poznanovich (first term)
1971–1973: John H. Downey Jr. (first term)
1973–1974: Gregory Jones Jr.
1974–1975: John H. Downey Jr. (second term)
1975–1976: Murray Zatman
1976–1977: Gerald M. Poznanovich (second term)
1977–1978: Clement Guggiana
1978–1979: Donna Born (first term)
1979–1980: Jack Healy
1980–1981: Jerry Wilhelm
1981–1982: Bill Barone
1982–1983: Donna Born (second term)
1983–1984: Jack Healy
1984–1985: Schuyler Jeffries
1985–1986: Ritch Burkart
1986–1987: Nanci Burton
1987–1988: Dave Berto
1988-1990: Mark Hulsman
1995-1998: Sharon Wright (first two terms)
1998-2000: Janet Condron
2002-2004: Sharon Wright (second term)
2004-2006: Jane Bender
2006-2007: Bob Blanchard
2007-2010: Susan Gorin
2010-2012: Ernesto Olivares
2012-2014: Scott Bartley
2014-2016: John Sawyer
2016–2018: Chris Coursey
2018–2020: Tom Schwedhelm
2020–2022: Chris Rogers
2022–2024: Natalie Rogers
2024–present: Mark Stapp
