= Charles O. Dunbar =

American newspaper publisher and politician

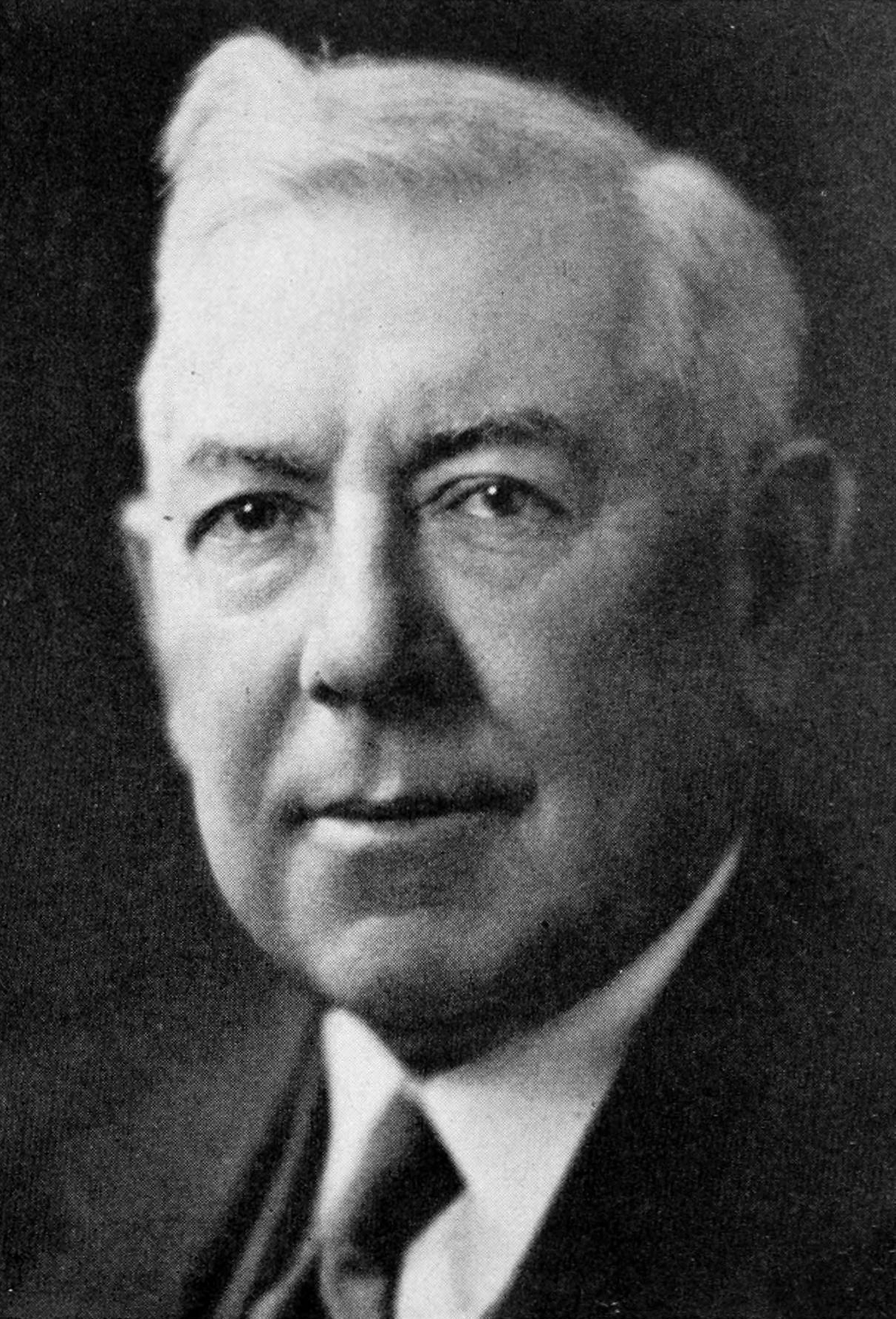
- Dunbar c. 1939

Collector of the Port of San Francisco
- In office July 1, 1933 – November 5, 1939
- Appointed by: Franklin D. Roosevelt
- Preceded by: William H. Hamilton
- Succeeded by: Paul R. Leake

City Manager of Santa Rosa
- In office May 1, 1926 – June 30, 1933
- Preceded by: J. E. Williams
- Succeeded by: Fred Steiner

Mayor of Santa Rosa
- In office April 3, 1924 – April 20, 1926
- Preceded by: Newton B. Kinley (acting)
- Succeeded by: John P. Overton

Postmaster of Santa Rosa
- In office April 1, 1914 – May 1, 1923
- Appointed by: Woodrow Wilson
- Preceded by: H. L. Tripp
- Succeeded by: J. E. Mobley

Member of the California State Assembly from the 15th district
- In office January 5, 1903 – January 2, 1905
- Preceded by: S. W. Irving
- Succeeded by: H. L. Tripp

Personal details
- Born: May 24, 1871 Glen Ellen, California, U.S.
- Died: November 5, 1939 (aged 68) The Geysers, California, U.S.
- Party: Democratic
- Spouse(s): Frances Reynolds (m. 1900; died 1918) Mabel Robertson (m. 1934)
- Children: William
- Occupation: Newspaper publisher, politician

Charles Oliver Dunbar (May 24, 1871 – November 5, 1939) was an American newspaper publisher and politician who co-founded The Press Democrat and held several public offices, including state assemblyman, mayor of Santa Rosa, and collector of the Port of San Francisco.

== Early life and career ==
Dunbar was born in Glen Ellen, California on May 24, 1871, the son of N. J. and Sarah E. (Pierson) Dunbar. He attended public school in Sonoma County and began work at the age of 12 after his father died. He entered the printing trade at 18 when he moved to San Francisco and began working for the Hawks & Shattuck type foundry. He moved back to Sonoma County at 21 and became composing room foreman for the Santa Rosa Republican. In 1894, he was elected president of the Santa Rosa Typographical Union.

In 1895, Dunbar went into business with fellow newspapermen Ernest L. Finley and Grant Richards, and the next year they founded The Evening Press. In 1897, they bought Thomas Thompson's Sonoma Democrat and merged the papers into The Press Democrat. Dunbar was a co-publisher of the paper from its foundation until he sold his share to Finley in 1916.

== Political career ==
Dunbar was a lifelong Democrat, active in local, state, and national politics. As early as 1894, he was elected a delegate to the Sonoma County Democratic Convention. He first ran for public office in 1896, when he was an unsuccessful candidate for Santa Rosa city treasurer. He was elected to the State Assembly in 1902, serving one term from 1903 to 1905. He was narrowly defeated for re-election in 1904, and in a bid for State Senate in 1906.

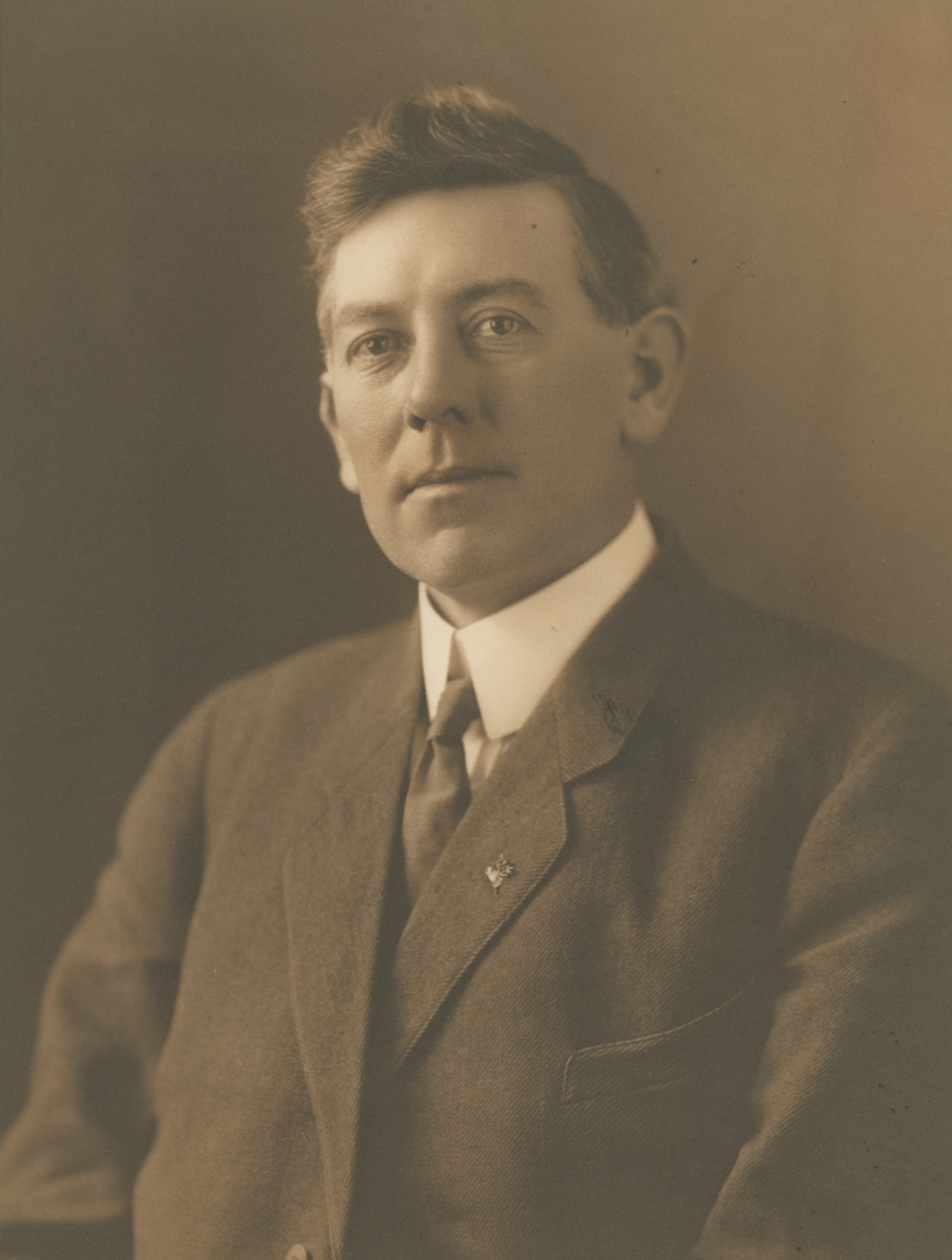
Portrait by Vaughan & Fraser, 1915

Dunbar was a delegate to the 1912 Democratic National Convention, pledged to speaker Champ Clark, but supported New Jersey governor Woodrow Wilson after his nomination. In 1914, Wilson appointed Dunbar postmaster of Santa Rosa, where he served from April of that year until May 1923, serving several months after his term had technically expired because a successor had never been appointed. He became a banker after leaving office.

In 1924, Santa Rosa adopted a new city charter instituting a council-manager government. Dunbar opposed the new charter and ran for city council, although he did not campaign explicitly on replacing it. He was elected alongside two other anti-charter candidates on a "People's ticket." They were sworn in on April 3, and the same day the council unanimously elected Dunbar mayor. He replaced Newton B. Kinley, who had been serving as acting mayor since the death of L. A. Pressley in February. Dunbar was re-elected in 1926, but resigned a week later to accept the position of city manager.

Earlier that year, Dunbar had announced his candidacy for lieutenant governor of California. Although he won the Democratic primary unopposed, he was soundly defeated in the November election by Buron Fitts. Dunbar continued to serve as city manager until 1933, when he was appointed collector of the Port of San Francisco by president Franklin D. Roosevelt. Dunbar previously led the California delegation of the Electoral College that certified Roosevelt's election.

== Death ==
Dunbar died in his sleep at The Geysers in Sonoma County on November 5, 1939. He had been in poor health for over a year. He was buried at the Santa Rosa Odd Fellows Cemetery in Santa Rosa. He was honored a year later in Who's Who in the New Deal (California edition), a biographical dictionary of prominent California Democrats, for his half-century of work for the party.

== See also ==
- The Press Democrat
