= James V. Coffey =

American politician (1846–1919)

- Coffey c. 1907

Presiding Judge of the San Francisco County Superior Court
- In office January 7, 1907 – January 6, 1908
- Preceded by: Thomas F. Graham
- Succeeded by: George A. Sturtevant
- In office January 3, 1887 – January 6, 1888
- Preceded by: M. A. Edmonds
- Succeeded by: John F. Finn

Judge of the San Francisco County Superior Court
- In office December 23, 1882 – January 15, 1919
- Preceded by: James A. Waymire
- Succeeded by: Michael J. Roche

Member of the California State Assembly from the 9th district
- In office December 6, 1875 – January 5, 1880
- Preceded by: Multi-member district
- Succeeded by: Multi-member district

Personal details
- Born: December 14, 1846 New York City, U.S.
- Died: January 15, 1919 (aged 72) San Francisco, California, U.S.
- Resting place: Holy Cross Cemetery, Colma, California, U.S.
- Party: Democratic
- Education: Read law St. Ignatius College (LL.D.)
- Occupation: Journalist, attorney, politician

James Vincent Coffey (December 14, 1846 – January 15, 1919) was an American journalist, attorney and politician who served in the California State Assembly from 1875 to 1880 and as a judge of the San Francisco County Superior Court from 1882 until his death in 1919. He served as presiding judge of the court in 1887 and 1907.

== Political career ==
Coffey receives indictments from grand jury foreman B. P. Oliver during the San Francisco graft trials, 1907

In the Assembly, Coffey served on the judiciary committee and was appointed chairman of the San Francisco delegation by his colleagues. He authored legislation to protect police officers from being fired without cause, reduce streetcar fares, and give the San Francisco Board of Supervisors the power to regulate gas rates. He first ran for the Superior Court in 1880, in an election so close that the Supreme Court of California ruled he had lost by a single vote. He ran again two years later and was elected.

Coffey presided over the court's probate department for all but the first seven months of his 36-year career; at the time of his death he was the longest serving probate judge in state history. He handled over 40,000 cases worth over $600,000,000, including the estates of Henry Miller, Charles Crocker, George Hearst, Charles Frederick Crocker, Thomas Henry Blythe, Peter Donahue, Leland Stanford, Thomas Bell, Lloyd Tevis, Adolph Sutro, John Dolbeer, Henry A. Peirce, Levi Cooper Lane and Claus Spreckels.

Coffey won special praise for his handling of the Blythe case, in which he ruled that Blythe's illegitimate daughter Florence was entitled to his $4 million estate. The case took a year to try and ended with a 125,000-word decision from Coffey, the longest in the history of the court.

Coffey's second term as presiding judge coincided with the San Francisco graft trials. In that position, he was responsible for receiving indictments from the grand jury against several high-profile defendants, including political boss Abe Ruef, San Francisco mayor Eugene Schmitz, United Railroads president Patrick Calhoun and former California attorney general Tirey L. Ford. During the trials he was endorsed by The Bulletin as an "honest judge."

== Personal life ==
Coffey was a close friend of the journalist and economist Henry George, who consulted with him while writing Progress and Poverty. Coffey served as president of the California Historical Society for over twenty years. He was awarded an honorary Doctor of Laws from St. Ignatius College in 1905.

== Gallery ==
Coffey c. 1890

Coffey c. 1900

"The Strange Effects of Coffe(e)y in the Blythe Case"

"Chief Cook Buckley (to the delegates at the San Jose Convention)"

== Electoral history ==
1882 San Francisco County Superior Court election
| Party | Candidate | Votes | % |
|---|---|---|---|
| Democratic | James V. Coffey | 22,986 | 14.9 |
| Democratic | James G. Maguire | 21,513 | 13.9 |
| Democratic | F. M. Clough | 20,840 | 13.5 |
| Democratic | D. J. Toohy | 19,990 | 12.9 |
| Republican | James A. Waymire | 18,799 | 12.2 |
| Republican | Columbus Bartlett | 17,051 | 11.0 |
| Republican | James M. Allen | 16,852 | 10.9 |
| Republican | J. M. Troutt | 16,612 | 10.7 |
| Total votes | | 154,643 | 100.0 |
| Turnout | | | |

== Works ==
- Shall the People or the Corporations Rule? The Paramount Issue. Speech of James V. Coffey, Chairman of San Francisco Delegation 1876 and 1878, March 7, 1878 on the Railroad Commission Bills, Twenty-Second Session Assembly of the Legislature of California.
- Coffey, James V. (1910). Probate Proceedings and Reform. San Francisco: The Recorder Printing and Publishing Company.

=== Decisions ===
- Coffey, James V. (1908). Reports of Decisions in Probate by James V. Coffey, Judge of the Superior Court, in and for the City and County of San Francisco, State of California. Vol. 1. San Francisco: Bancroft-Whitney Company.
- Coffey, James V. (1909). Reports of Decisions in Probate by James V. Coffey, Judge of the Superior Court, in and for the City and County of San Francisco, State of California. Vol. 2. San Francisco: Bancroft-Whitney Company.
- Coffey, James V. (1909). Reports of Decisions in Probate by James V. Coffey, Judge of the Superior Court, in and for the City and County of San Francisco, State of California. Vol. 3. San Francisco: Bancroft-Whitney Company.
- Coffey, James V. (1909). Reports of Decisions in Probate by James V. Coffey, Judge of the Superior Court, in and for the City and County of San Francisco, State of California. Vol. 4. San Francisco: Bancroft-Whitney Company.
- Coffey, James V. (1910). Reports of Decisions in Probate by James V. Coffey, Judge of the Superior Court, in and for the City and County of San Francisco, State of California. Vol. 5. San Francisco: Bancroft-Whitney Company.
- Coffey, James V. (1916). Reports of Decisions in Probate by James V. Coffey, Judge of the Superior Court, in and for the City and County of San Francisco, State of California. Vol. 6. San Francisco: Bancroft-Whitney Company.

Political offices
| Preceded by Two members | California State Assemblyman, 9th District; 1875-1880 (with three others) | Succeeded by Four members |
