= Edward C. Marshall =

American politician

- Engraving from a daguerreotype by Jesse Harrison Whitehurst c. 1851–1853

14th Attorney General of California
- In office January 10, 1883 – January 8, 1887
- Governor: George Stoneman
- Preceded by: Augustus L. Hart
- Succeeded by: George A. Johnson

Member of the U.S. House of Representatives from California's at-large district
- In office March 4, 1851 – March 3, 1853
- Preceded by: George Washington Wright
- Succeeded by: Milton S. Latham

Personal details
- Born: Edward Colston Marshall; June 29, 1821 Woodford County, Kentucky
- Died: July 9, 1893 (aged 72) San Francisco, California
- Resting place: Mountain View Cemetery (Oakland, California)
- Party: Democratic
- Education: Centre College (attended); Transylvania University; Washington College (attended)

Military service
- Allegiance: United States
- Years of service: c. 1846–1848
- Battles/wars: Mexican–American War

Edward Colston Marshall (June 29, 1821 – July 9, 1893) was an American politician who served as congressman from California's at-large district from 1851 to 1853, and as California attorney general from 1883 to 1887. He was a member of the Democratic Party.

== Early life and career ==
Edward Colston Marshall was born in Woodford County, Kentucky, on June 29, 1821. He attended Centre College in Danville, Kentucky, and graduated from Transylvania University, Lexington, Kentucky. He later attended Washington College (now Washington and Lee University), where he studied law. He was admitted to the bar and moved to San Francisco, California, and later to Sonora, California, where he practiced law.

== Military career ==
Marshall served in the Mexican-American War.

== Congress ==
He was elected as a Democrat to the Thirty-second Congress (March 4, 1851 – March 3, 1853); was renominated in 1852, but withdrew before the election.

== Later career ==
He then settled in Marysville, Calif., and again engaged in the practice of law. He was an unsuccessful candidate for election to the United States Senate in 1856. He moved back to Kentucky and devoted himself to legal pursuits for the next twenty-one years. He eventually returned to San Francisco in 1877 and continued the practice of law. In 1882, he was elected attorney general of California, serving in that role from 1883 to 1886.

== Death ==
He died in San Francisco on July 9, 1893, and was interred in Mountain View Cemetery in Oakland, California.

U.S. House of Representatives
Preceded by George Washington Wright	Member of the U.S. House of Representatives from California's at-large congressional district 1851–1853	Succeeded by Milton S. Latham
Legal offices
Preceded by Augustus L. Hart	California Attorney General; 1883–1887	Succeeded by George A. Johnson
