= California Attorney General =

Head of the California Department of Justice

Attorney General of California
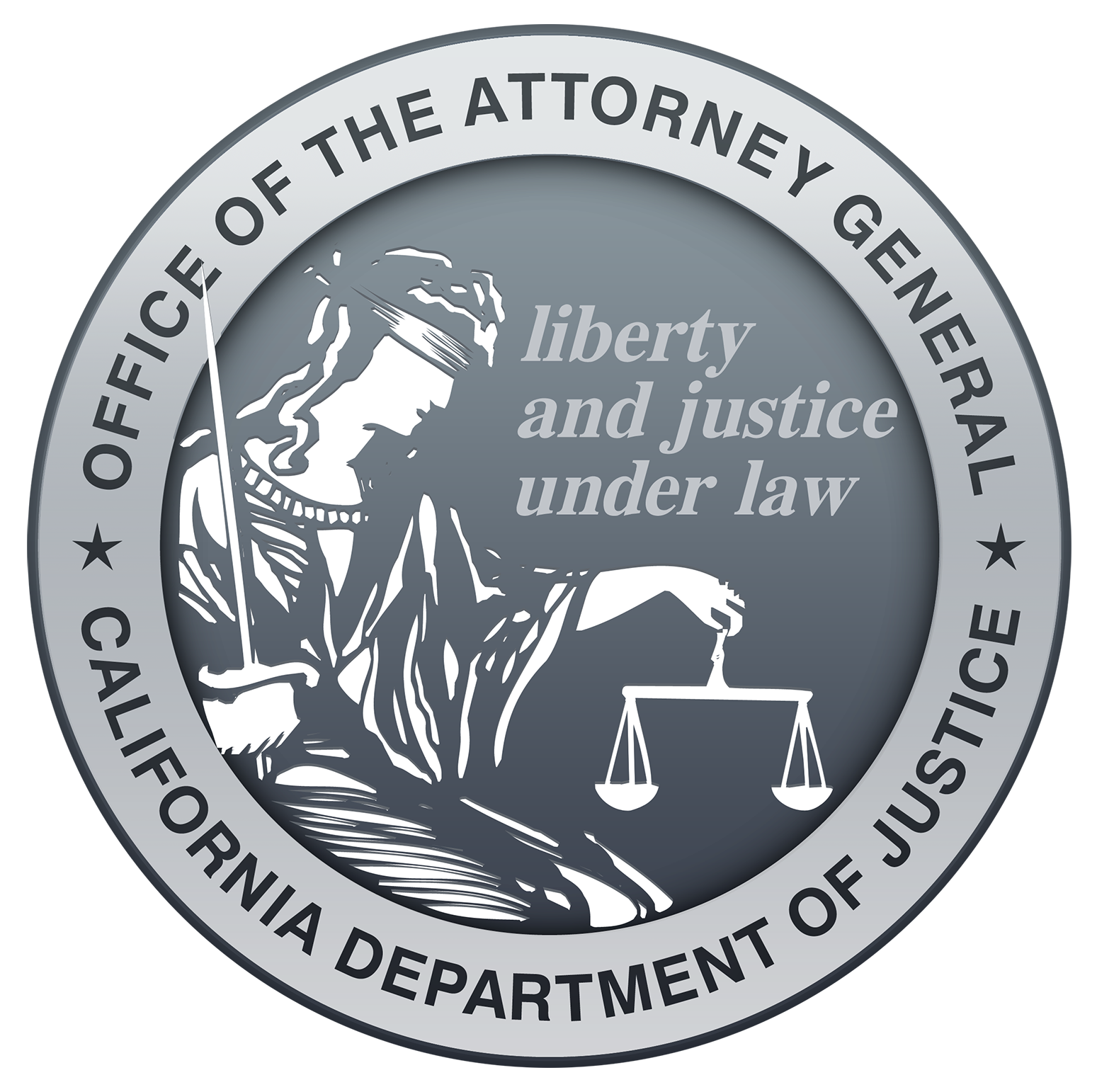
- Seal of the attorney general of California

- State flag

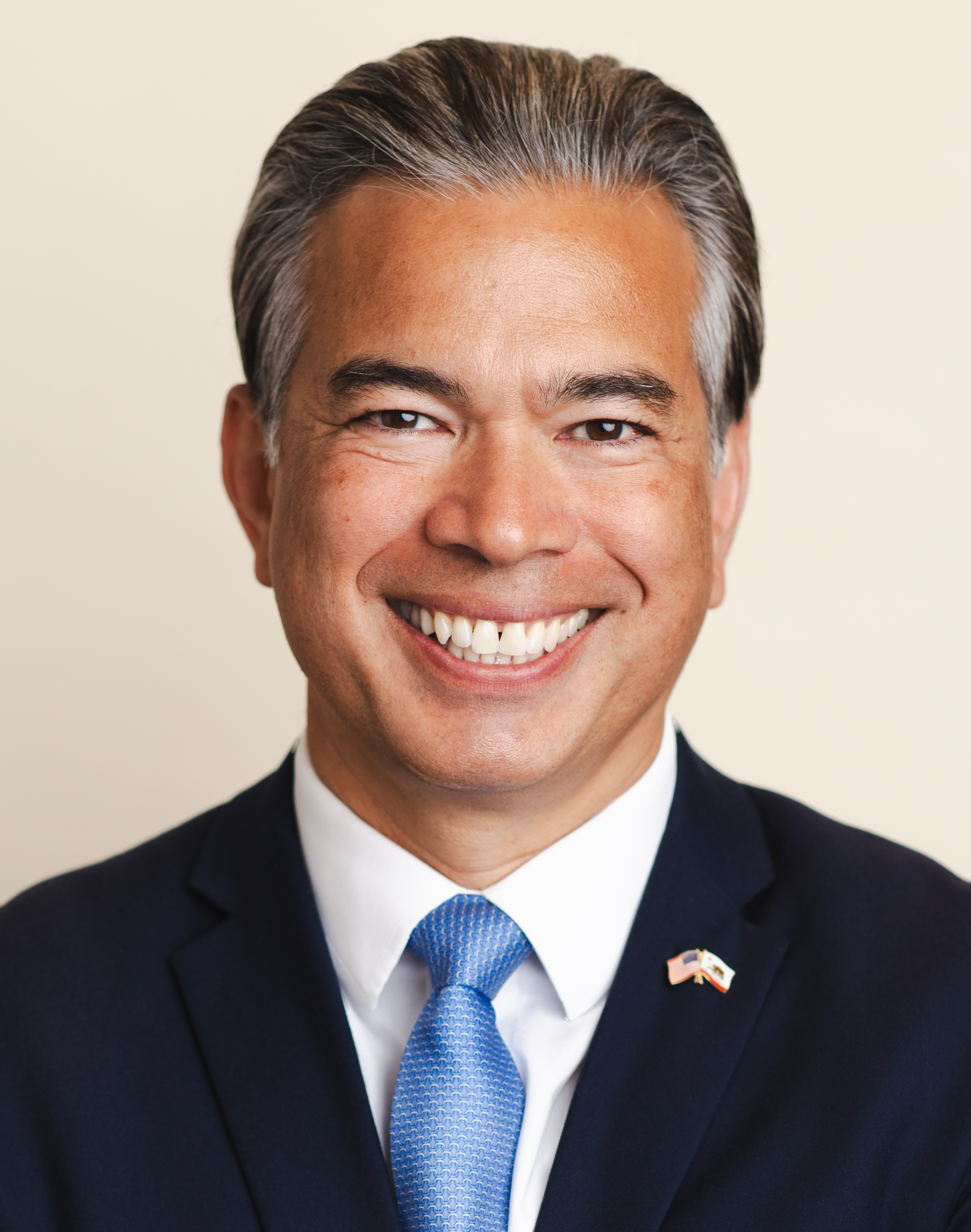
- Incumbent; Rob Bonta since April 23, 2021
- Government of California; Department of Justice
- Style: The Honorable
- Term length: Four years, two-term limit
- Inaugural holder: Edward J. C. Kewen; 1849
- Formation: California Constitution
- Succession: Fifth
- Salary: $210,460
- Website: oag.ca.gov

The attorney general of California is the state attorney general of the government of California. The officer must ensure that "the laws of the state are uniformly and adequately enforced" (Constitution of California, Article V, Section 13). The California attorney general carries out the responsibilities of the office through the California Department of Justice. The department employs over 1,100 attorneys and 3,700 non-attorney employees.

The California attorney general is elected to a four-year term, with a maximum of two terms. The election is held during the same statewide election for the governor and other state offices. Several attorneys general have gone on to higher office or office on the federal level, including the offices of governor, United States Senator, chief justice of the United States Supreme Court, and vice president of the United States.

On March 24, 2021, Governor Gavin Newsom announced that he would be appointing Rob Bonta as attorney general to succeed Xavier Becerra, who resigned from the position to become Secretary of Health and Human Services under President Joe Biden. Bonta's appointment was subject to confirmation by both houses of the California State Legislature, and he was sworn in on April 23, 2021.

== Duties ==
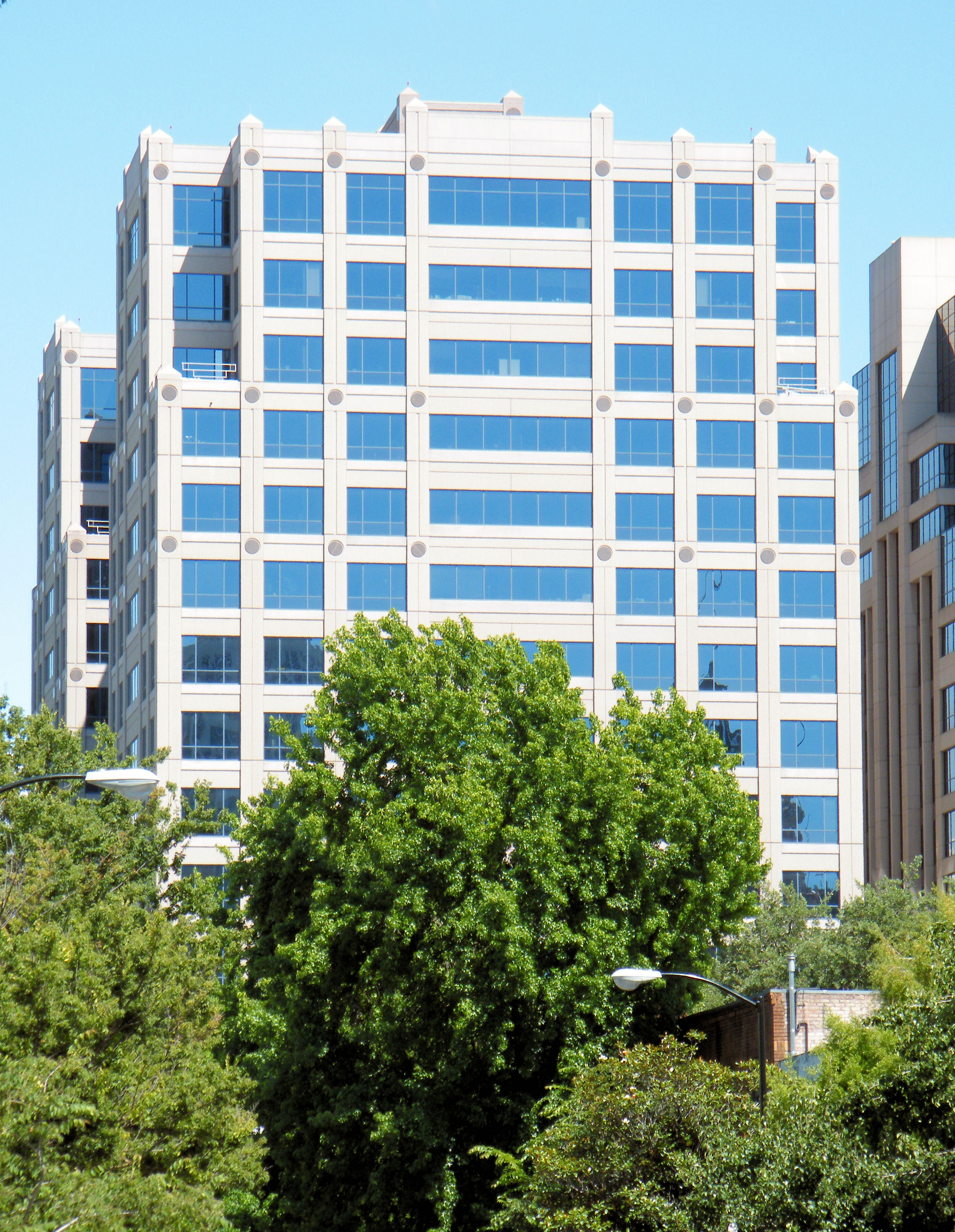
The California attorney general's main office in Sacramento is housed in this building.

According to the state Constitution, the Code of Civil Procedure, and the Government Code, the attorney general:

- As the state's chief law officer, ensures that the laws of the state are uniformly and adequately enforced.
- Heads the Department of Justice, which is responsible for providing state legal services and support for local law enforcement.
- Acts as the chief counsel in state litigation.
- Works with and provides legal support to law enforcement agencies across the state and may intervene in certain cases, but local district attorneys and sheriffs operate independently.

== History ==
Although the office of attorney general dates to the admission of California to the Union, the office in its modern form dates to Proposition 4 of 1934, sponsored by Alameda County District Attorney Earl Warren as one of four initiatives he sponsored to substantially reform law enforcement and the judiciary. Previously, the attorney general lacked jurisdiction over matters in the jurisdiction of locally elected district attorneys and sheriffs. Warren went on to become attorney general himself in 1938, reorganizing's the state's law enforcement into districts.

Under Robert W. Kenny, the office was complicit in the incarceration of Japanese Americans during World War II, a position it has since apologized for.

== Diversity ==
- William H. H. Hart was the first immigrant to hold the office.
- Stanley Mosk was the first adherent of Judaism to hold the office.
- George Deukmejian was the first Armenian American to hold the office.
- Kamala Harris was the first woman, the first African American, the first Asian American and the first West Indian American to hold the office.
- Xavier Becerra was the first Latino to hold the office.
- Rob Bonta is the first Filipino American to hold the office.

== List of attorneys general of California ==
No.	Portrait	Name	Party	Term
1		Edward J. C. Kewen	Democratic	December 20, 1849 – 1850
2		James A. McDougall	Democratic	1850 – 1851
3		Serranus C. Hastings	Democratic	January 5, 1852 – January 2, 1854
4		John R. McConnell	Democratic	January 2, 1854 – January 9, 1856
5		William M. Stewart	Democratic	June 7, 1854 – December 1854 (acting)
6		William T. Wallace	American	January 9, 1856 – January 8, 1858
7		Thomas H. Williams	Democratic	January 8, 1858 – January 10, 1862
8		Frank M. Pixley	Republican	January 10, 1862 – December 10, 1863
9		John G. McCullough	Republican	December 10, 1863 – December 5, 1867
10		Jo Hamilton	Democratic	December 5, 1867 – December 8, 1871
11		John L. Love	Republican	December 8, 1871 – December 9, 1875
12		Jo Hamilton	Democratic	December 9, 1875 – January 8, 1880
13		Augustus L. Hart	Republican	January 8, 1880 – January 10, 1883
14		Edward C. Marshall	Democratic	January 10, 1883 – January 8, 1887
15		George A. Johnson	Democratic	January 8, 1887 – January 8, 1891
16		William H. H. Hart	Republican	January 8, 1891 – January 11, 1895
17		William F. Fitzgerald	Republican	January 7, 1895 – January 2, 1899
18		Tirey L. Ford	Republican	January 4, 1899 – September 14, 1902
19		Ulysses S. Webb	Republican	September 15, 1902 – January 3, 1939
20		Earl Warren	Republican	January 3, 1939 – January 4, 1943
21		Robert W. Kenny	Democratic	January 4, 1943 – January 5, 1947
22		Frederick N. Howser	Republican	January 5, 1947 – January 8, 1951
23		Pat Brown	Democratic	January 8, 1951 – January 5, 1959
24		Stanley Mosk	Democratic	January 5, 1959 – August 31, 1964
25		Thomas C. Lynch	Democratic	August 31, 1964 – January 4, 1971
26		Evelle J. Younger	Republican	January 4, 1971 – January 8, 1979
27		George Deukmejian	Republican	January 8, 1979 – January 3, 1983
28		John Van de Kamp	Democratic	January 3, 1983 – January 7, 1991
29		Dan Lungren	Republican	January 7, 1991 – January 4, 1999
30		Bill Lockyer	Democratic	January 4, 1999 – January 8, 2007
31		Jerry Brown	Democratic	January 8, 2007 – January 3, 2011
32		Kamala Harris	Democratic	January 3, 2011 – January 3, 2017
33		Xavier Becerra	Democratic	January 24, 2017 – March 18, 2021
34		Rob Bonta	Democratic	April 23, 2021 – Incumbent

== See also ==
- Impeachment in California
