= Augustus L. Hart =

American politician (1849–1901)

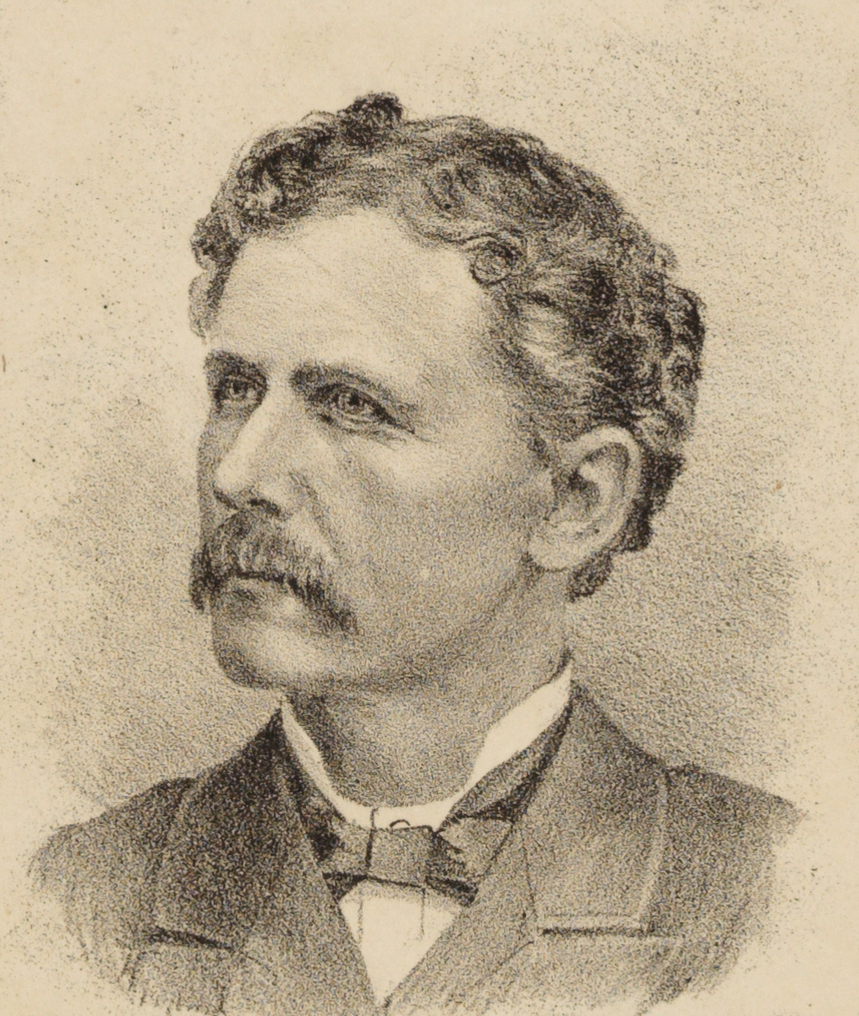
- Engraving by Britton & Rey from a photograph by G. D. Morse, 1882

13th Attorney General of California
- In office January 8, 1880 – January 10, 1883
- Governor: George Clement Perkins
- Preceded by: Jo Hamilton
- Succeeded by: Edward C. Marshall

Personal details
- Born: October 15, 1849 Indiana, U.S.
- Died: 1901 (aged 51–52) Livermore, California, U.S.
- Party: Republican

Augustus L. Hart (October 15, 1849 – 1901) was the 13th Attorney General of California.

== Birth ==
Augustus L. Hart was born in Indiana on October 15, 1849.

== Politics ==
Hart believed that it is necessary to empower the rights of the people of California and it was derived from the equal protection of the law.

=== Quotes ===
Hart claimed California’s destiny is immortality "if she will ever maintain the rights of the poor as the rights of the rich; will ever look to the interest of the laboring classes, the men whose property, though small in degree to them, are equal to those of the richer classes. She will maintain their rights and will maintain the rights of the agriculturalists, maintain the rights of the mechanics, the farmers, the lawyers and all-extending equality to all her people the entire extent of her domain...."

== Death ==
Augustus L. Hart died in Livermore, California in 1901.

Legal offices
| Preceded by Jo Hamilton | Attorney General of California; 1880–1883 | Succeeded by Edward C. Marshall |
