= International Socialist Review =

International Socialist Review may refer to:

- International Socialist Review (1900), a defunct American socialist journal associated with the Socialist Party of America
- International Socialist Review (1956), a defunct American socialist journal published by the United States Socialist Workers Party
- International Socialist Review (1997), a defunct (2019) American socialist journal published by the Center for Economic Research and Social Change (CERSC)

== See also ==
- International Socialism (magazine), a British-based quarterly socialist journal published by the Socialist Workers Party
