= Palo Verde Dam =

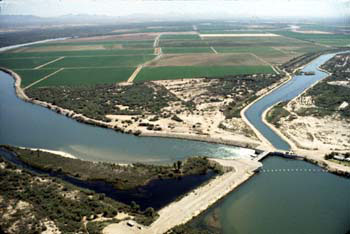
- Location: La Paz County, Arizona / Riverside County, California
- Coordinates: 33.7325°N 114.5107°W
- Construction began: 1956; 69 years ago
- Opening date: 1958; 67 years ago

Dam and spillways
- Impounds: Colorado River
- Height: 45 ft
- Length: 1850 ft

The Palo Verde Dam (officially called the Palo Verde Diversion Dam) is a diversion dam on the Colorado River in La Paz County, Arizona, and Riverside County, California, in the southwestern United States, approximately 9 miles (14 km) northeast of Blythe. The dam is earthen and rockfill, built solely to divert water into irrigation canals serving the Palo Verde Irrigation District. It measures 1,850 feet (560 m) long at its crest, which is at an elevation of 283.5 feet (86.4 m), and stands 46 feet (14 m) high above the riverbed, containing approximately 175,000 cubic yards (134,000 m^{3}) of material. Construction of the dam, which began in 1956 and ended in 1958, was authorized by the U.S. Bureau of Reclamation. The dam was constructed to raise the water level of the river because the upstream Hoover and Davis Dams blocked sediment, causing significant degradation of the riverbed that hampered water diversion.

The dam diverts about 1,800 cubic feet (51 m^{3}) of water per second to irrigate 121,000 acres (490 km^{2}) of the Palo Verde Valley and mesa lands on the west side of the Colorado River in California. The headworks of the diversion canal consists of four 12 feet (3.7 m) by 8 feet (2.4 m) pipes, while the spillway is a gated structure consisting of three 50 feet (15 m) long gates separated by 8 feet (2.4 m) thick piers. The control house of the dam is found immediately upstream of the headworks area.

== See also ==
- List of dams and reservoirs in California
