= Charles W. Saalburg =

American cartoonist and illustrator (1865–1947)

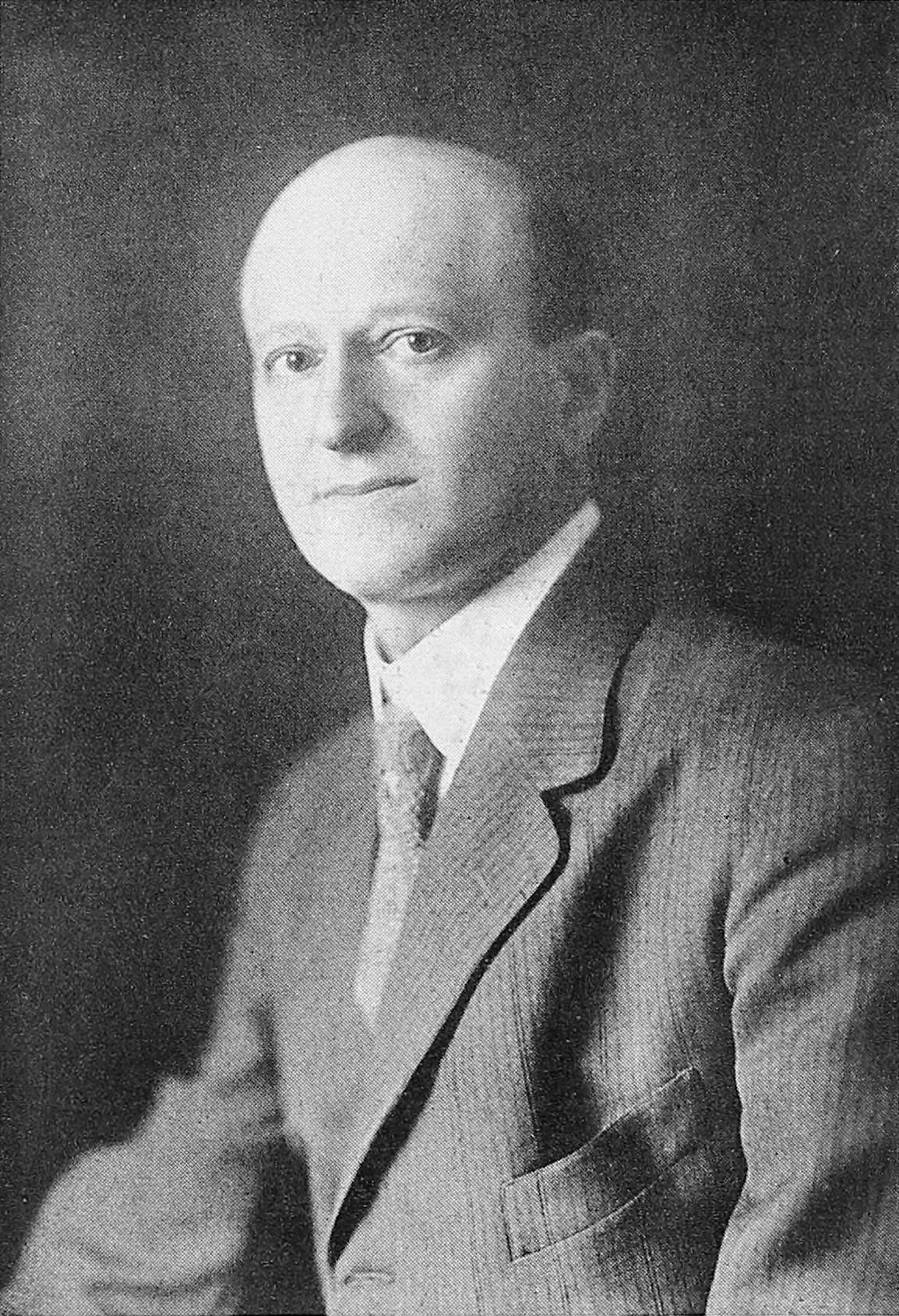
- Saalburg c. 1908
- Born: 1865
- Died: 1947 (aged 81–82)
- Known for: cartooning, illustrating

Charles William Saalburg (1865 – 1947) was an American cartoonist and illustrator who lived in San Francisco, and whose work appeared in the San Francisco Wasp and Examiner, the New York World, as well as periodicals in Paris and London. In 1894, he created The Ting Ling Kids comic strip for the Chicago Inter Ocean, which is typically considered the earliest regular American newspaper comic strip to be printed in color.

As chief of the World's color department, he is also credited with giving the bright yellow color to R. F. Outcault's character The Yellow Kid. In 1895, he used the Kid's characteristic oversized shirt to test a new, quick-drying yellow ink. The Yellow Kid, originally drawn with a blue shirt or in black and white, would give rise to the term "yellow journalism".

== Gallery ==
1890 cover of The Wasp

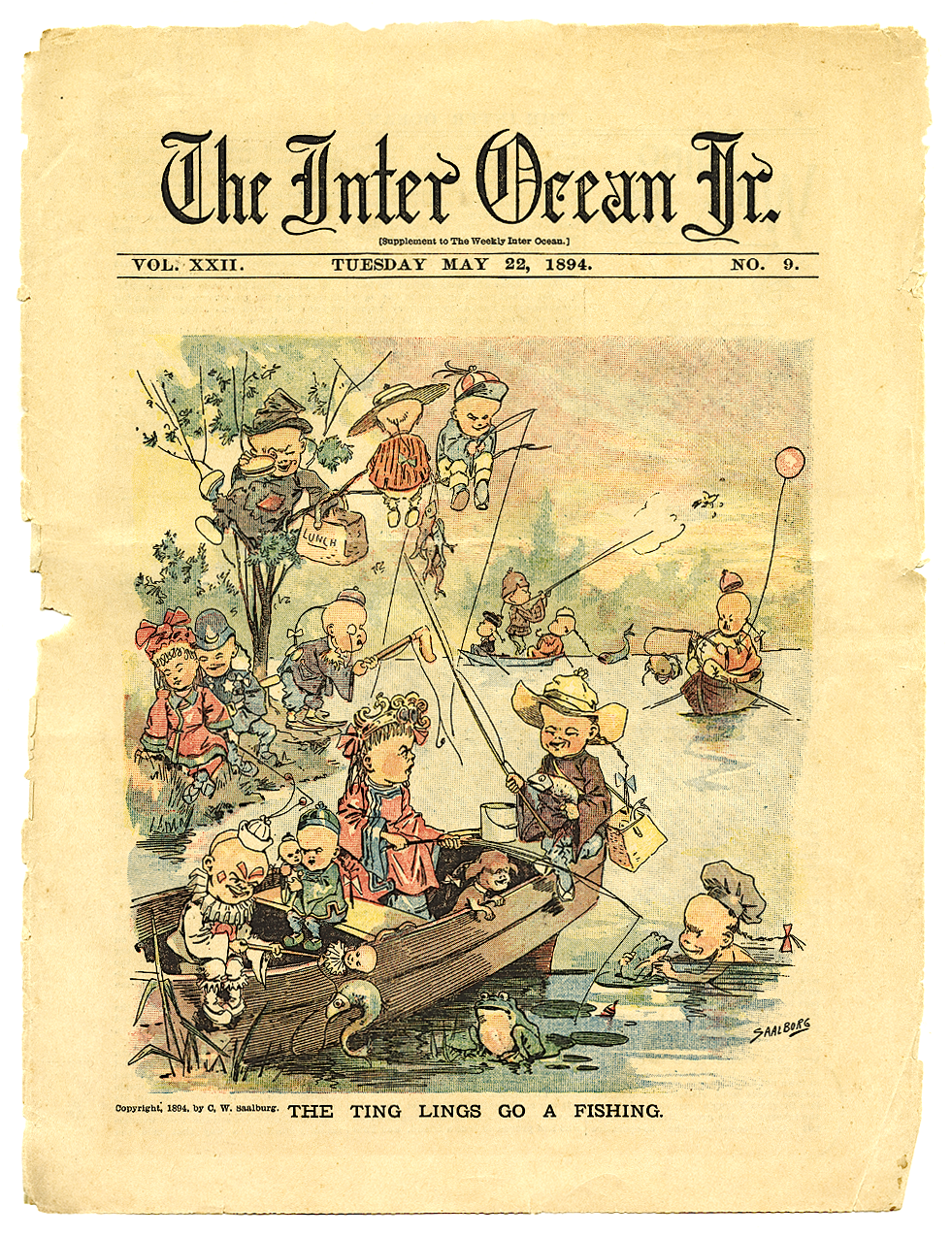
1894 cartoon for the Inter Ocean

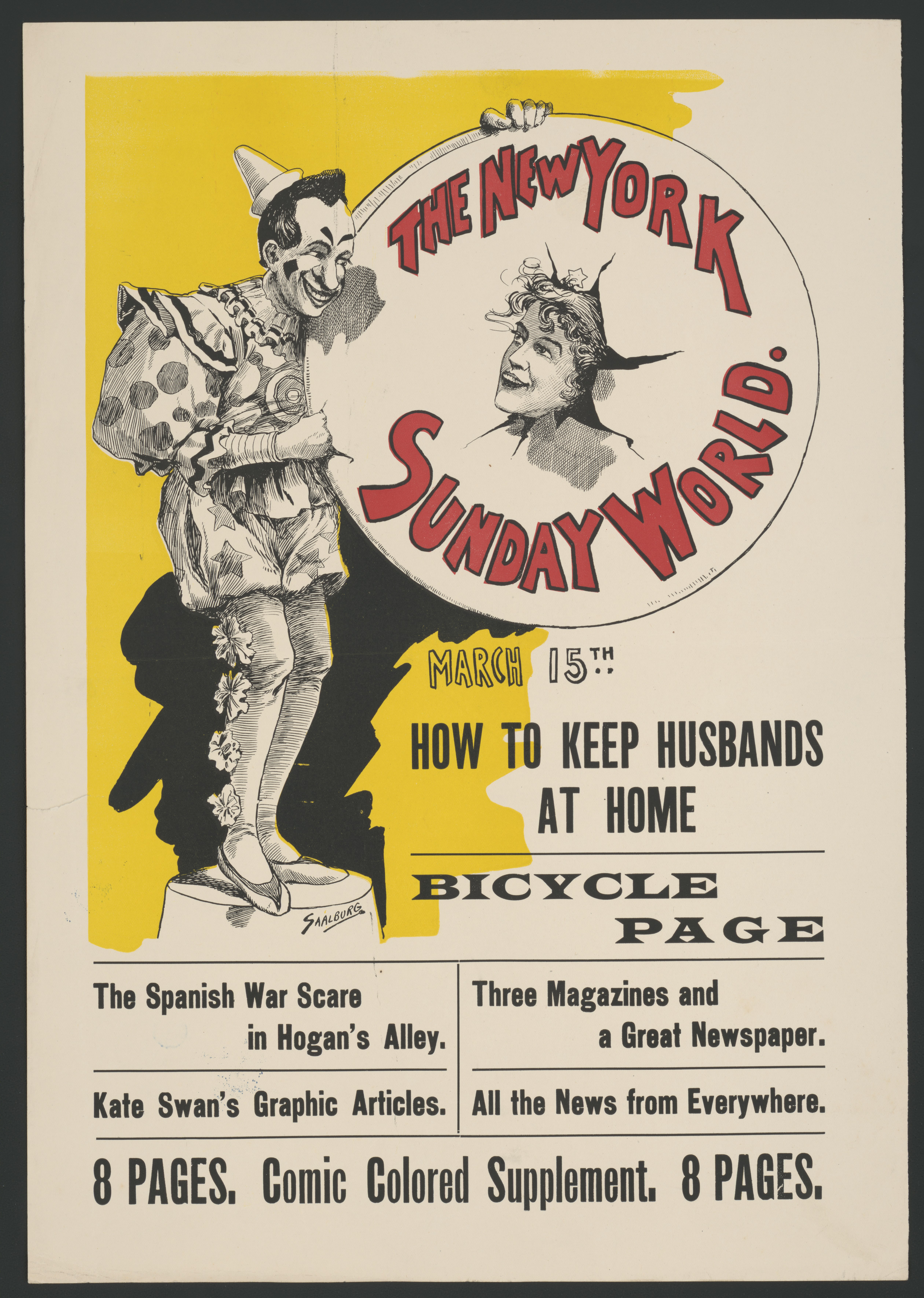
1896 poster for the World
