= List of power stations in California =

Sources of California in-state electricity generation in gigawatt-hours, 2025.
1. Natural gas: 73,326 (35.4%)
2. Solar: 55,574 (26.8%)
3. Hydroelectric: 27,855 (13.4%)
4. Nuclear: 17,558 (8.48%)
5. Wind: 16,257 (7.85%)
6. Geothermal: 10,747 (5.19%)
7. Biomass: 4,438 (2.14%)
8. Other gases: 1,114 (0.54%)
9. Coal: 234 (0.11%)
10. Petroleum: 55 (0.03%)

This is a list of power stations in the U.S. state of California that are used for utility-scale electricity generation. This includes baseload, peaking, and energy storage power stations, but does not include large backup generators. As of 2018, California had 80 GW of installed generation capacity encompassing more than 1,500 power plants; with 41 GW of natural gas, 26.5 GW of renewable (12 GW solar, 6 GW wind), 12 GW large hydroelectric, and 2.4 GW nuclear.

In 2020, California had a total summer capacity of 78,055 MW through all of its power plants, and a net energy generation of 193,075 GWh. Its electricity production was the third largest in the nation behind Texas and Florida. California ranks first in the nation as a producer of solar, geothermal, and biomass resources. Utility-scale solar photovoltaic and thermal sources together generated 17% of electricity in 2021. Small-scale solar including customer-owned PV panels delivered an additional net 19,828 GWh to California's electrical grid, equal to about half the generation by the state's utility-scale facilities.

The Diablo Canyon Power Plant in San Luis Obispo County is the largest power station in California with a nameplate capacity of 2,256 MW and an annual generation of 18,214 GWh in 2018. The largest under construction is the Westlands Solar Park in Kings County, which will generate 2,000 MW when completed in 2025.

The California Independent System Operator (CAISO) oversees the operation of its member utilities.

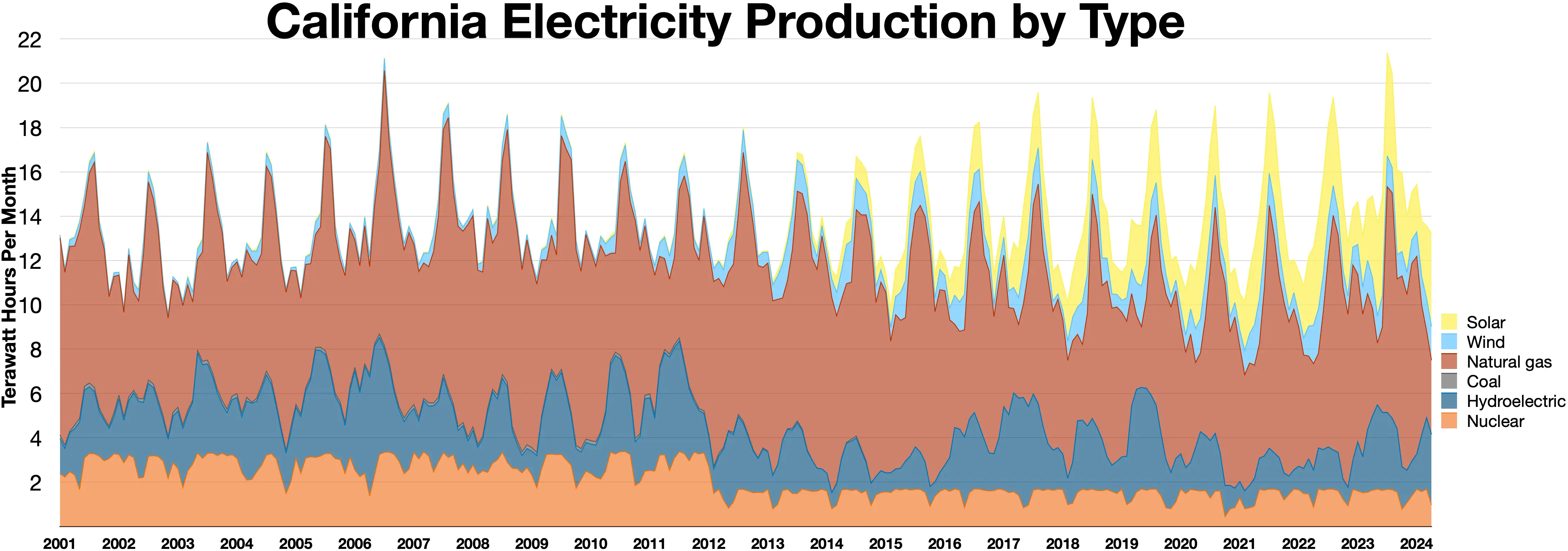
California electricity production by type showing seasonal variation in generation

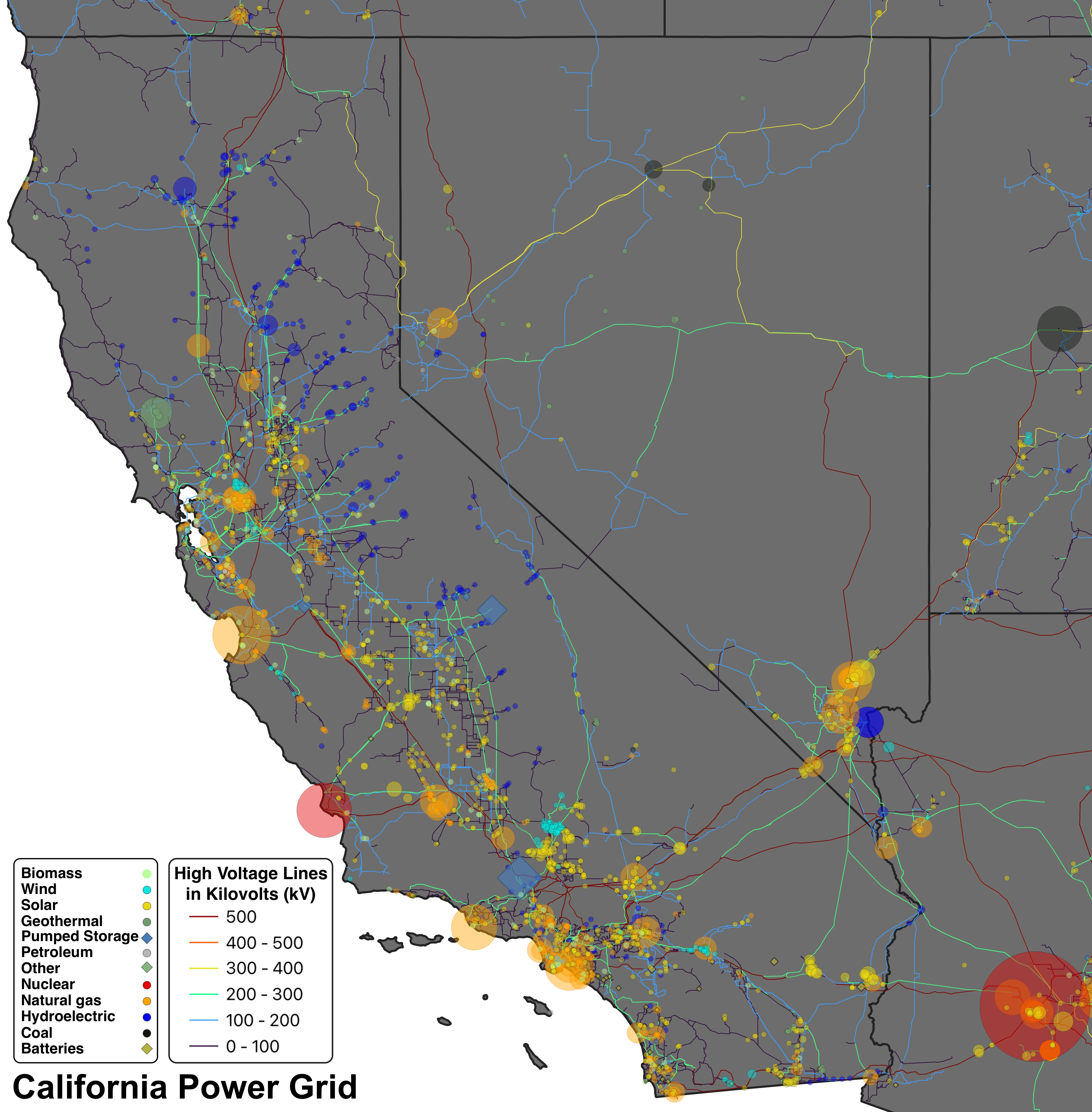
California power grid

Locations of the three largest power stations (per type) in California.
biomass, coal, geothermal, hydro, natural gas,
nuclear, solar, wind
cities

== Battery storage ==
This is a list of operational battery storage power stations in California with a nameplate capacity of at least 10 megawatts.

Name	Location	Coordinates	Power (MW)	Energy storage (MWh)	Owner	Year	Ref
Edwards Sanborn				3287		2022-2024	875 MW(dc) solar
Vistra 500kV	Moss Landing	?	450	1800	Vistra Moss Landing	2020-23	
Crimson Energy Storage	Blythe	33°36′37″N 114°35′47″W	350	1400	Recurrent Energy	October 2022	
Desert Peak Energy Storage I	Palm Springs		325	1300		July 2023	
Eland			300	1200	Arevon	2025	758 MW solar
Condor	San Bernardino		200	800	Arevon	2024	
Peregrine	Barrio Logan		200	800	Arevon	2025	
Moss Landing Elkhorn battery	Moss Landing		182.5	730		2022	
Vikings	Holtville		150	600	Arevon	2025	157 MW solar
Alamitos BESS	Long Beach	?	100	400	Alamitos Energy Center	2021	
Stanton Battery Energy Storage	Stanton	33°48′24.3864″N 117°59′15.4968″W	68.8	275.2	W Power, LLC	2023	
Gateway Energy Storage	Otay Mesa	32°34′11″N 116°54′39″W	250	250	LS Power Group	2020	
Pomona Energy Storage Facility	Pomona	34°03′34″N 117°46′27″W	20	80	AltaGas	2017	
Beacon BESS 1	Kern County	35°15′25″N 118°01′25″W	20	10	LADWP	2018	
El Centro BESS	El Centro	32°48′11″N 115°32′33″W	30	20	IID	2016	
Escondido Energy Storage	Escondido	33°07′29″N 117°06′53″W	30	120	SDG&E, AES	2017	
Mira Loma Energy Storage Facility	Ontario	34°00′24″N 117°33′34″W	20	80	SCE, Tesla Energy	2017	
Vista Energy Storage System	Vista	33°12′15″N 117°15′13″W	40	?	LS Power Group	2018	

== Biomass ==
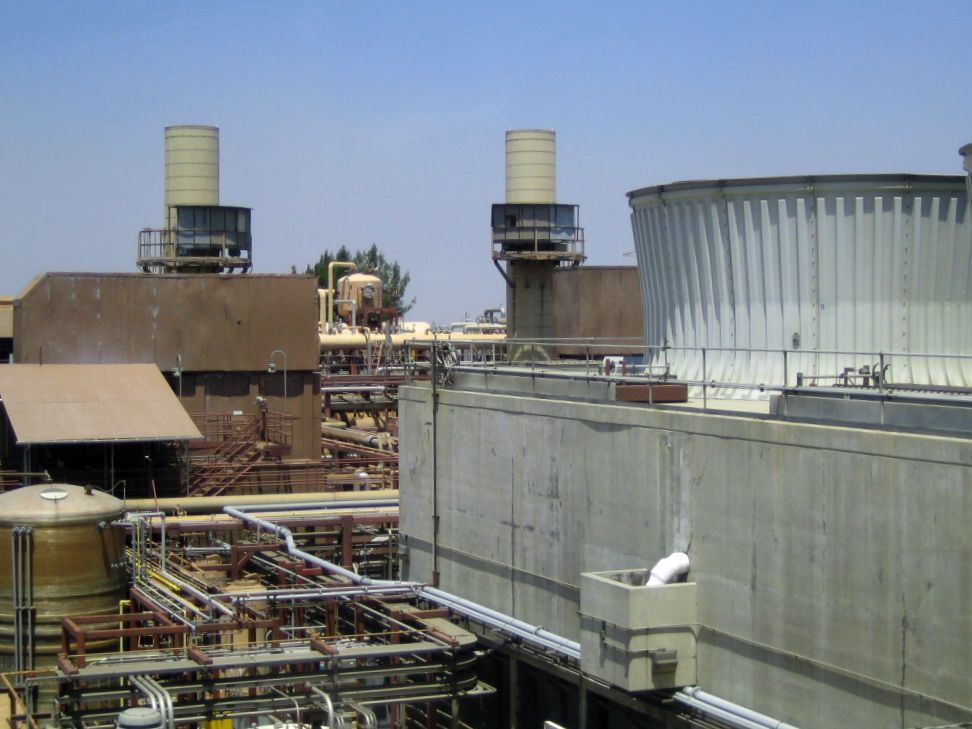
Puente Hills Energy Recovery

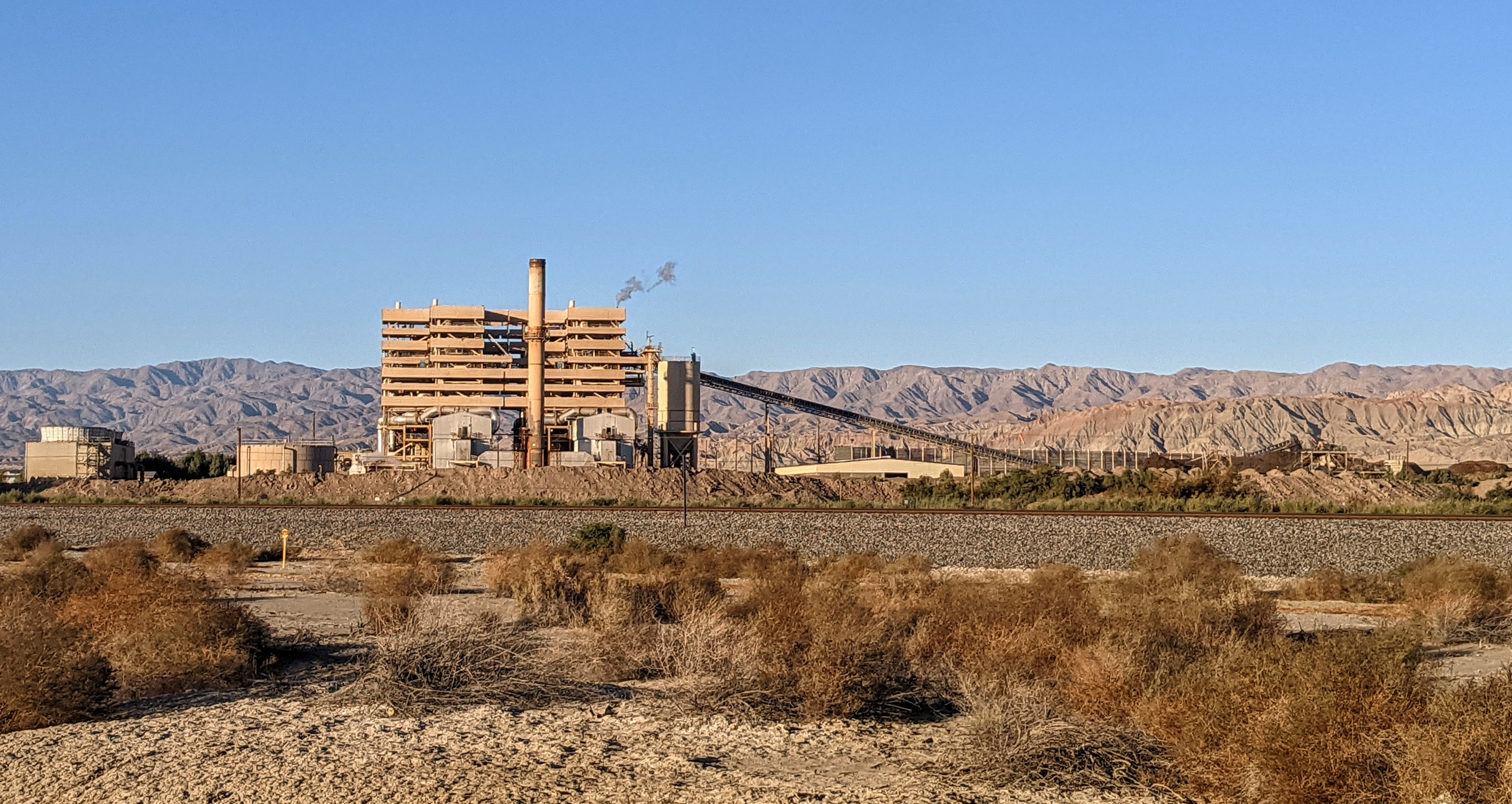
Greenleaf Power's Desert View woody-biomass plant at Mecca, California

This is a list of operational biomass and biogas power stations in California with a nameplate capacity of at least 10 megawatts.

Name	Location	Coordinates	Capacity (MW)	Owner	Type	Year	Ref
Buena Vista Biomass Power	Buena Vista	38°17′N 120°55′W	18.5	Maas Companies	Biomass	1990s	
Burney Forest Power	Johnson Park	40°55′N 121°38′W	11	North American Energy Services	Biomass		
Desert View Power	Mecca	33°35′N 116°05′W	55.5	Greenleaf Power	Biomass	1992	
Dinuba Energy	Reedley	36°34′N 119°25′W	12	Community Renewable Energy Services	Biomass	1985	
Honey Lake	Lassen County	40°22′N 120°16′W	32	Greenleaf Power	Biomass	1989	
Hyperion DGUP	Los Angeles	33°55′35″N 118°25′49″W	33	Los Angeles City Sanitation	Biogas	2016	
Loyalton Biomass Plant	Loyalton	39°40′N 120°14′W	20	American Renewable Power	Biomass	1987	
Mount Poso Cogeneration	Kern County	35°35′N 119°01′W	45	DTE Power	Biomass	1980	
Pacific Ultrapower Chinese Station	Tuolumne County	37°52′N 120°29′W	22	IHI Power Generation Corporation, Jamestown Energy	Biomass	1986	
Port of Stockton District Energy Facility	Stockton	37°56′N 121°20′W	50	DTE Power	Biomass	1988	
Puente Hills Energy Recovery	Los Angeles County	34°01′25″N 118°01′28″W	50	Los Angeles County Sanitation District	Biogas	1980s	
Reworld Stanislaus	Stanislaus County	37°23′07″N 121°08′28″W	22.5	Reworld	Biomass	1989	
Rio Bravo Fresno	Fresno	36°41′N 119°43′W	28.7	IHI Power Generation Corporation	Biomass	1988 (Note: To be decommissioned in 2021.)	
Rio Bravo Rocklin	Whitney	38°50′N 121°19′W	27.3	Constellation Energy, North American Power Group	Biomass	1989	
Scotia Mill	Scotia	40°28′52.5″N 124°06′16.2″W	18	Humboldt Sawmill Company	Biomass	1988	
Southeast Resource Recovery Facility	Long Beach	33°45′33″N 118°14′25″W	35.6	Los Angeles County Sanitation District, Covanta Energy	Incinerator	1988	
Sunshine Gas Producers	Los Angeles County	34°20′08″N 118°31′10″W	23.5	DTE Power	Biogas	2014	
Total Energy Facilities	San Pedro	33°46′24″N 118°17′01″W	38.4	Los Angeles County Sanitation District	Biogas	1980s	
Wheelabrator Shasta	Anderson	40°26′N 122°17′W	55	Wheelabrator Technologies	Biomass	1987	
Woodland	Woodland	38°41′N 121°44′W	25	DTE Power	Biomass		

== Coal ==
The Argus Cogeneration Plant in San Bernardino County is the only coal-fired power station still operating within the state of California. The Intermountain Power Plant (which is 75% owned by LADWP along with five other Los Angeles area cities) in the state of Utah supplied 20% of the electricity consumed by Los Angeles residents in 2017.

Name	Location	Coordinates	Capacity (MW)	Owner	Type	Year	Ref	Notes
Argus Cogeneration Plant	Trona	35°45′54″N 117°22′56″W	63	Searles Valley Minerals	Coal	1978		
Intermountain Power Plant	Delta, Utah	39°30′27″N 112°34′49″W	1,900	LADWP (50%), other Los Angeles area cities (25%)	Coal	1986		Plans exist for replacing this plant with an 840-MW natural gas plant, capable of burning up to 30% hydrogen, by 2025.

== Geothermal ==
This is a list of all operational geothermal power stations in California.

Name	Location	Coordinates	Capacity (MW)	Owner	Type	Year	Ref
Coso	Inyo County	36°01′00″N 117°47′51″W	272.2	Coso Operating Company	Flash steam	1987	
The Geysers	Sonoma, Lake County	38°47′26″N 122°45′21″W	1,590	Calpine, NCPA, SVP, USRG	Dry steam	1960	
Heber	Imperial County	32°42′52″N 115°31′37″W	161.5	Ormat	Binary cycle	1985	
Imperial Valley	Imperial County	33°09′48″N 115°37′00″W	432.3	CalEnergy, EnergySource	Dry steam	1982	
Mammoth	Mono County	37°38′44″N 118°54′42″W	40	Ormat	Binary cycle	1984	
North Brawley	Imperial County	33°00′52″N 115°32′27″W	64	Ormat	Binary cycle	2010	
Ormesa	Imperial County	32°46′59″N 115°15′15″W	101.6	Ormat	Binary cycle	1987	

== Hydroelectric ==
=== Conventional ===
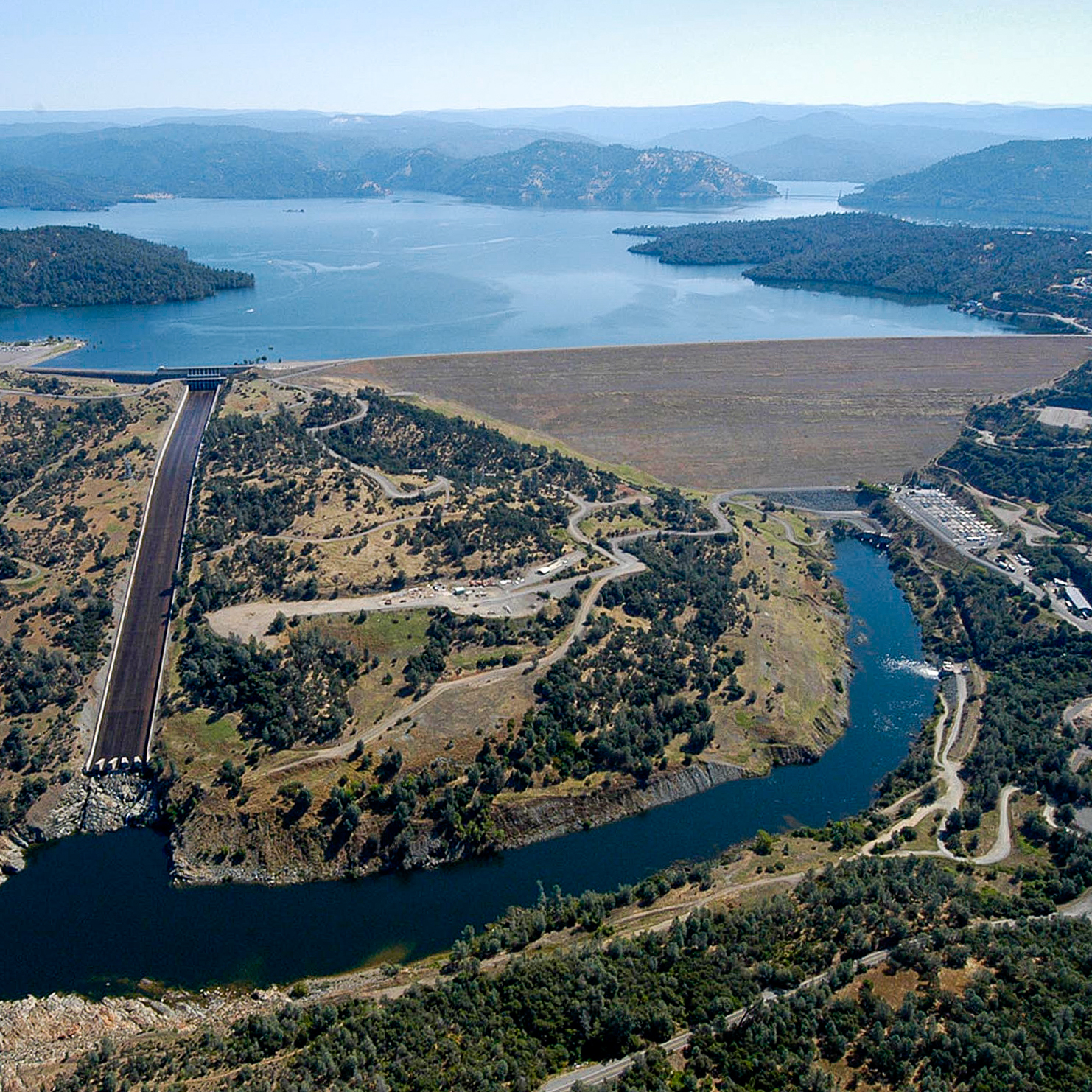
Oroville Dam, the second largest hydroelectric dam in California by nameplate capacity

Conventional hydroelectric power stations include traditional reservoir and run-of-the-river hydroelectric power stations. The list below includes all conventional hydroelectric power station in the state with a nameplate capacity of at least 50 megawatts.

Name	Location	Coordinates	Capacity (MW)	Owner	Year	Ref
Balch Powerhouse	Fresno County	36°54′32″N 119°05′16″W	128.2	PG&E	1927	
Belden Powerhouse	Plumas County	40°00′27″N 121°14′58″W	118	PG&E	1969	
Big Creek No. 1	Fresno County	37°12′15″N 119°14′23″W	88.4	SCE	1913	
Big Creek No. 2	Fresno County	37°11′57″N 119°18′20″W	66.6	SCE	1913	
Big Creek No. 2A	Fresno County	37°11′56″N 119°18′22″W	110	SCE	1928	
Big Creek No. 3	Fresno County	37°08′55″N 119°23′12″W	174.5	SCE	1923	
Big Creek No. 4	Fresno County	37°08′21″N 119°29′23″W	100	SCE	1951	
Big Creek No. 8	Fresno County	37°12′35″N 119°19′44″W	75	SCE	1921	
Bucks Creek Powerhouse	Plumas County	39°54′38″N 121°19′39″W	66	PG&E	1928	
Camino Powerhouse	El Dorado County	38°47′44″N 120°37′19″W	157.8	SMUD		
Caribou No. 1	Plumas County	40°05′08″N 121°08′53″W	73.8	PG&E	1921	
Caribou No. 2	Plumas County	40°05′10″N 121°08′58″W	118	PG&E	1958	
Cresta Powerhouse	Plumas County	39°49′34″N 121°24′34″W	73.8	PG&E		
Devil Canyon	San Bernardino	34°12′20″N 117°20′05″W	276.2	CDWR		
Dion R Holm Powerhouse	Tuolumne County	37°53′48″N 119°58′06″W	156.8			
Donnells Powerhouse	Tuolumne County	38°14′47″N 120°02′02″W	72			
Drum No. 2 Powerhouse	Placer County	39°15′26″N 120°46′01″W	53	PG&E		
Electra Powerhouse	Amador County	38°19′52″N 120°40′12″W	102.5	PG&E	1900	
Folsom Dam	Folsom	38°42′28″N 121°09′23″W	198.6	USBR	1956	
Haas Powerhouse	Fresno County	36°55′39″N 119°01′13″W	135	PG&E		
James B Black Powerhouse	Shasta County	40°59′32″N 121°58′31″W	168.6	PG&E		
Jaybird Powerhouse	El Dorado County	38°50′03″N 120°31′54″W	161.6	SMUD	1961	
Judge Francis Carr Powerhouse	Shasta County	40°38′49″N 122°37′37″W	154.4	USBR	1963	
Kerckhoff Powerhouse No. 2	Fresno County	37°04′17″N 119°33′32″W	139.5	PG&E		
Keswick Dam	Keswick	40°36′43″N 122°26′45″W	117	USBR	1950	
Loon Lake Powerhouse	El Dorado County	38°59′05″N 120°19′40″W	74	SMUD	1971	
Mammoth Pool Powerhouse	Madera County	37°13′13″N 119°20′16″W	190	SCE	1959	
Middle Fork Powerhouse	Placer County	39°01′29″N 120°35′47″W	122.4			
Moccasin Powerhouse	Moccasin	37°48′33″N 120°17′58″W	100	SFPUC	1930	
New Bullards Bar Dam	Yuba County	39°23′36″N 121°08′35″W	315	YCWA	1969	
New Don Pedro Dam	La Grange	37°42′03″N 120°25′15″W	170.8	MID, TID	1971	
New Exchequer Dam	Merced Falls	37°39′32″N 120°15′14″W	94.5	MeID	1967	
New Melones Dam	Calaveras County	37°56′57″N 120°31′27″W	300	USBR	1979	
Oroville Dam	Oroville	39°32′20″N 121°29′08″W	644	CDWR	1968	
Parker Dam	Parker Dam	34°17′47″N 114°08′21″W	120	USBR	1938	
Pine Flat Dam	Piedra	36°49′57″N 119°19′33″W	165	USACE	1954	
Pit No. 1 Powerhouse	Shasta County	40°59′27″N 121°29′53″W	69.2	PG&E		
Pit No. 3 Powerhouse	Shasta County	40°59′51″N 121°44′52″W	80	PG&E		
Pit No. 4 Powerhouse	Shasta County	40°59′11″N 121°50′57″W	103.4	PG&E		
Pit No. 5 Powerhouse	Shasta County	40°59′11″N 121°58′39″W	141.6	PG&E		
Pit No. 6 Powerhouse	Shasta County	40°55′21″N 121°59′34″W	79.2	PG&E		
Pit No. 7 Powerhouse	Shasta County	40°50′51″N 121°59′26″W	109.8	PG&E		
Poe Powerhouse	Plumas County	39°43′22″N 121°28′11″W	142.8	PG&E		
R.C. Kirkwood Powerhouse	Tuolumne County	37°52′39″N 119°57′12″W	155.5			
Ralston Powerhouse	Placer County	39°00′04″N 120°43′30″W	79.2			
Rock Creek Powerhouse	Plumas County	39°54′18″N 121°20′43″W	126	PG&E		
San Francisquito No. 1	Los Angeles County	34°35′24″N 118°27′17″W	65.5	LADWP	1917	
Shasta Dam	Shasta Lake	40°43′07″N 122°25′08″W	714	USBR	1945	
Spring Creek Power Plant	Keswick	40°37′42″N 122°28′04″W	180	USBR	1964	
Tiger Creek Powerhouse	Amador County	38°26′57″N 120°29′34″W	52.2	PG&E	1931	
Trinity Dam	Trinity County	40°47′58″N 122°45′46″W	140	USBR	1962	
White Rock Powerhouse	El Dorado County	38°45′54″N 120°47′14″W	266.5	SMUD		
William E. Warne	Los Angeles County	34°41′06″N 118°47′17″W	74	CDWR		

=== Pumped-storage ===
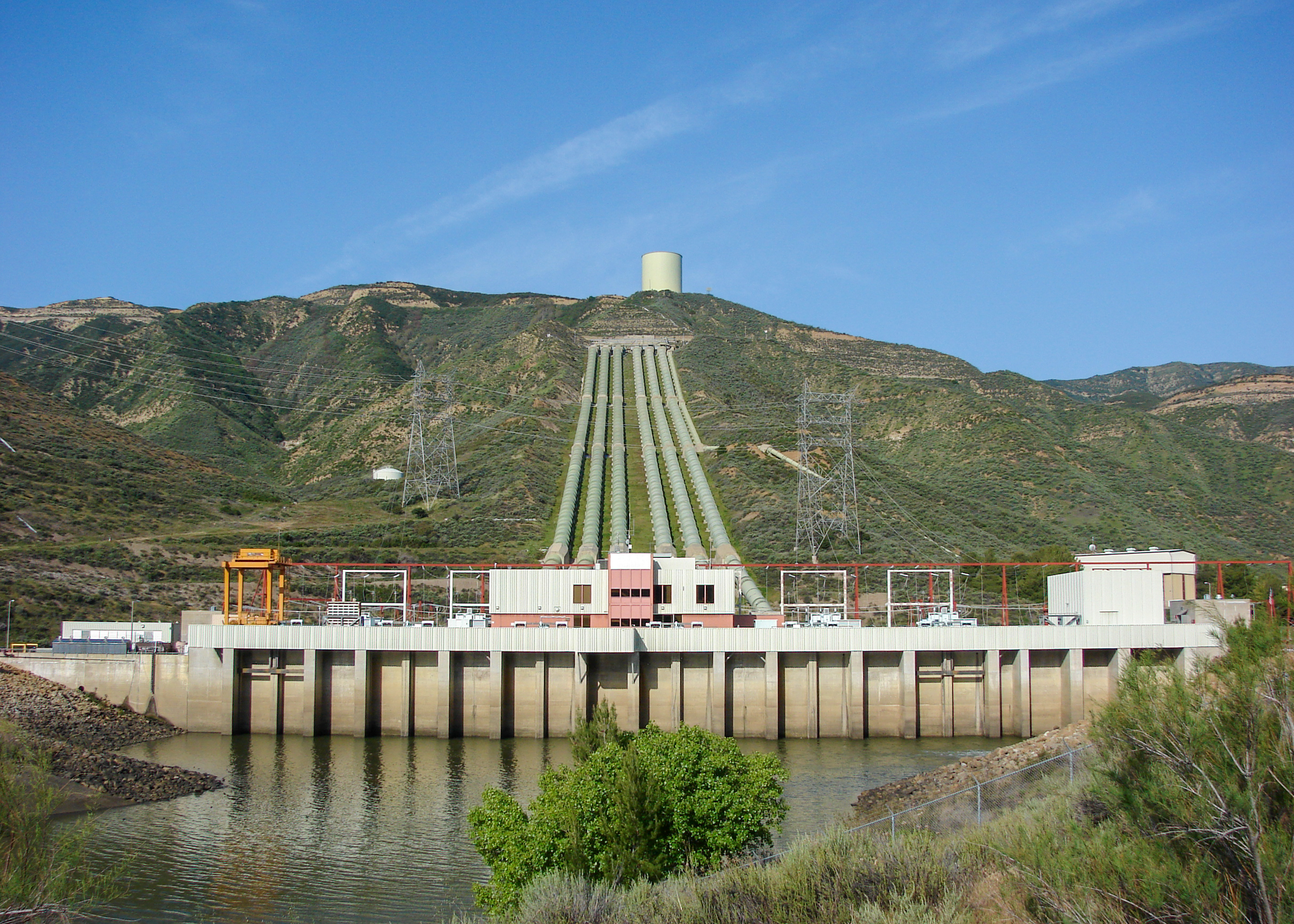
Castaic Power Plant, the largest pumped-storage power station in California

Pumped-storage hydroelectricity is important means of large-scale grid energy storage that helps improve the daily capacity factor of California's electricity generation system. This is a list of all operational pumped-storage power stations in California.

Name	Location	Coordinates	Capacity (MW)	Owner	Year	Ref
Castaic	Los Angeles County	34°35′15″N 118°39′24″W	1,500	CDWR, LADWP	1973	
Helms	Fresno County	37°02′21″N 118°57′49″W	1,212	PG&E	1984	
J.S. Eastwood	Fresno County	37°08′52″N 119°15′24″W	200	SCE	1987	
Lake Hodges	San Diego County	33°03′29″N 117°07′08″W	42	SDCWA	2012	
O'Neill	Merced County	37°05′55″N 121°02′52″W	25	USBR	1967	
Thermalito	Thermalito	39°30′55″N 121°37′45″W	120	CDWR	1968	
William R. Gianelli	Merced County	37°04′07″N 121°04′48″W	424	CDWR, USBR	1968	

== Natural gas ==
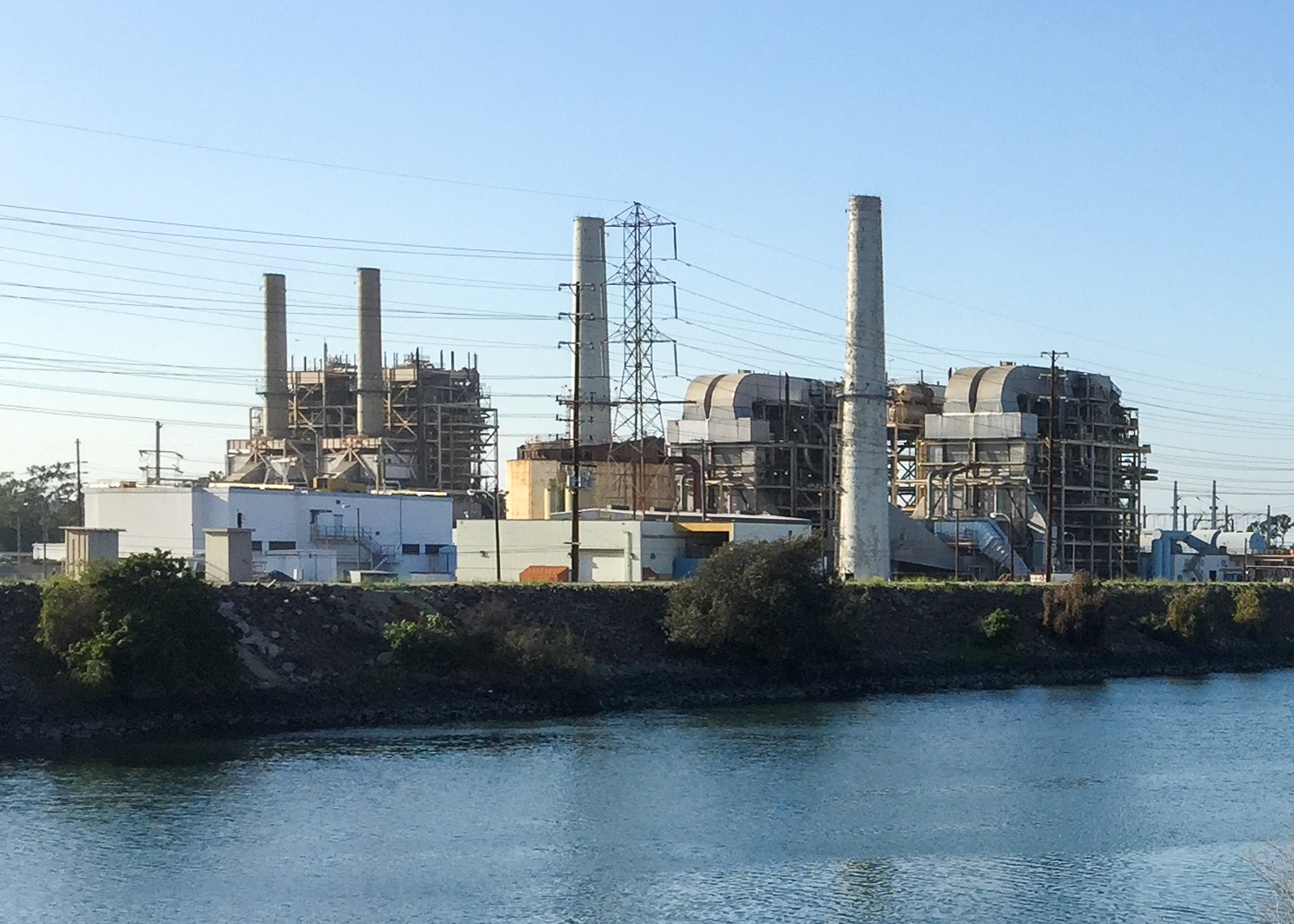
Alamitos Energy Center, the largest natural gas-fired power station in California

This is a list of operational natural gas-fired power stations in California with a nameplate capacity of at least 100 megawatts.

Name	Location	Coords.	Capacity (MW)	Owner	Year	Ref
AES Redondo Beach	Redondo	33°50′59″N 118°23′43″W	1,310	AES Corporation	1954 (Note: To be decommissioned in 2021, 2022, or 2023.)	
Alamitos Energy Center	Long Beach	33°46′09″N 118°06′07″W	1,760	AES Corporation	1950s	
Almond Power Plant	Ceres	37°34′28″N 120°59′07″W	233.5	Turlock Irrigation District	1995	
Blythe Energy Center	Blythe	33°36′44″N 114°40′51″W	507	AltaGas		
Canyon Power Project	Anaheim	33°51′31″N 117°51′43″W	200	SCPPA	2011	
Carlsbad Energy Center	Carlsbad	33°08′24″N 117°20′0″W	530	NRG Energy	2019	
Carson Ice-Gen Project	Sacramento County	38°26′44″N 121°27′45″W	125.5	Carson Energy Group	1995	
Colusa Generating Station	Maxwell	39°21′55″N 122°16′7″W	712.4	PG&E	2010	
Cosumnes Power Plant	Herald	38°20′18″N 121°7′26″W	556	SMUD	2006	
Crockett Cogeneration Project	Crockett	38°03′26″N 122°12′55″W	247.4	C&H Sugar	1996	
Delta Energy Center	Pittsburg	38°1′2″N 121°50′44″W	857	Calpine	2002	
Donald Von Raesfeld Power Plant	Santa Clara	37°22′37″N 121°57′4″W	154	SVP	2005	
El Centro Generating Station	El Centro	32°48′08″N 115°32′23″W	388.3 (Note: Includes 30 MW of battery storage.)	IID	1957	
El Segundo Cogen	El Segundo	33°54′20″N 118°24′13″W	180	Chevron	1987	
El Segundo Energy Center	El Segundo	33°54′36″N 118°25′29″W	537.4	NRG Energy, Clearway Energy	1964	
Elk Hills Power	Kern County	35°16′48″N 119°28′14″W	623	Sempra Energy Resources, Occidental Petroleum	2003	
Foster Wheeler Martinez Power Plant	Martinez	38°01′16″N 122°04′04″W	113.5			
Gateway Generating Station	Antioch	38°1′1″N 121°45′32″W	530	PG&E	2009	
Gilroy Cogeneration Plant	Gilroy	37°00′01″N 121°32′13″W	130	Calpine	1988	
Gilroy Energy Center	Gilroy	36°59′57″N 121°32′11″W	141	Calpine	2002	
Glenarm Power Plant	Pasadena	34°07′35″N 118°08′54″W	265.6	Pasadena Water and Power	1907	
Grayson Power Plant	Glendale	34°09′19″N 118°16′42″W	301	Glendale Water and Power	1941	
Harbor Steam Plant	Wilmington	33°46′10″N 118°15′55″W	548	LADWP	1949 (Note: To be decommissioned by the end of 2029.)	
Haynes Generating Station	Long Beach	33°45′56″N 118°05′44″W	575	LADWP	1957 (Note: To be decommissioned by the end of 2029.)	
High Desert Power Project	Adelanto	34°35′42″N 117°21′52″W	852	NAES	2003	
Humboldt Bay Generating Station	Humboldt Bay	40°44′27″N 124°12′30″W	167	PG&E	2010	
Huntington Beach Energy Project	Huntington Beach	33°38′42″N 117°58′35″W	869	AES Corporation	1958	
Indigo Energy Facility	Desert Hot Springs	33°54′40″N 116°33′11″W	149.7	Wildflower Energy	2001	
Kern River Cogeneration	Bakersfield	35°26′23″N 118°59′22″W	300	Fluor, Texaco	1987	
King City Cogeneration Plant	King City	36°13′30″N 121°07′34″W	120	Calpine	1989	
La Paloma	McKittrick	35°17′47″N 119°35′34″W	1,200	NAES	2003	
Lodi Energy Center	Lodi	38°05′17″N 121°23′14″W	339	NCPA	2012	
Los Esteros Critical Energy Center	San Jose	37°25′30″N 121°55′56″W	306	Calpine	2003	
Los Medanos Energy Center	Pittsburg	38°1′48″N 121°52′23″W	678.3	Calpine	2001	
Magnolia Power Project	Burbank	34°10′40″N 118°18′53″W	448	SCPPA	1941	
Malaga Power Plant	Malaga	36°41′24″N 119°44′26″W	121	KRCD	2005	
Malburg Generating Station	Vernon	33°59′55″N 118°13′16″W	141.8	City of Vernon	2005	
Mariposa Energy Project	Alameda	37°47′21″N 121°36′06″W	199.6	Mariposa Energy	2011	
Marsh Landing	Antioch	38°1′0″N 121°45′54″W	828	NRG Energy	2013	
Martinez Refining Co. Power Plant	Martinez	38°01′01″N 122°06′47″W	100			
McClure Power Plant	Modesto	37°37′45″N 120°55′53″W	142.4			
Metcalf Energy Center	Coyote	37°13′12″N 121°44′41″W	635	Calpine	2005	
Midway Sunset	Kern County	35°13′38″N 119°37′47″W	234	Sunoco LP, SCE	1989	
Miramar Energy Facility	San Diego	32°52′34″N 117°09′56″W	106			
Moss Landing Power Plant	Moss Landing	36°48′18″N 121°46′55″W	1,060	Vistra Energy	1950	
Mountainview Generating Station	Redlands	34°4′51″N 117°14′34″W	1,036	SCE	1956	
Niland Peaker	Niland	33°14′35″N 115°29′58″W	121	IID	2008	
Orange Grove Energy Center	Pala	33°21′33″N 117°06′41″W	118	NAES, J-POWER USA	2010	
Ormond Beach	Oxnard	34°7′45″N 119°10′8″W	1,516	NRG Energy	1971 (Note: To be decommissioned by the end of 2021.)	
Otay Mesa Energy Center	Otay Mesa	32°34′25″N 116°54′48″W	688.5	Calpine	2009	
Palomar Energy Center	Escondido	33°7′10″N 117°7′3″W	559	SDG&E	2006	
Panoche Energy Center	Firebaugh	36°39′09″N 120°34′55″W	682.2	NAES	2009	
Pastoria Energy Facility	Kern County	34°57′22″N 118°50′38″W	779	Calpine	2005	
Pio Pico Energy Center	Otay Mesa	32°34′26″N 116°55′05″W	395.4	NAES, SWG	2016	
Redding Power	Redding	40°30′33″N 122°25′27″W	183	MLP Power	1995	
Richmond Cogen	Richmond	37°56′25″N 122°23′23″W	155.6	Chevron	1992	
Ripon Cogen	Ripon	37°43′53″N 121°06′58″W	170.5	MID	2006	
Riverside Energy Resource Center	Riverside	33°57′48″N 117°27′11″W	196			
Roseville Energy Park	Roseville	38°47′33″N 121°22′56″W	164	Roseville Energy	2007	
Russell City Energy Center	Hayward	37°38′7″N 122°8′4″W	655	Calpine, GE Power	2013	
SCA Cogen 2	Sacramento	38°31′51″N 121°24′01″W	193.4			
SCA Cogen 3	Sacramento	38°30′40″N 121°28′26″W	174			
Scattergood	Playa del Rey	33°55′07″N 118°25′40″W	876	LADWP	1959 (Note: To be decommissioned by the end of 2029.)	
Sentinel Energy Center	Desert Hot Springs	33°56′11″N 116°34′22″W	800	Gemma Power	2013	
Sunrise Power Plant	Fellows	35°12′38″N 119°35′04″W	605.4	Chevron, SCE	2001	
Sutter Energy Center	Sutter County	39°03′10″N 121°41′47″W	636	Calpine	2001	
Sycamore Cogeneration	Bakersfield	35°20′40″N 118°43′44″W	300	Chevron	1987	
Tracy Combined Cycle Power Plant	Tracy	37°42′40″N 121°29′30″W	336	GWF Energy	2012	
Valley	Los Angeles	34°14′39″N 118°23′33″W	690.5	LADWP	1957	
Walnut Energy Center	Turlock	37°29′15″N 120°53′45″W	300.6	TID	1987	
Walnut Creek Energy Park	Industry	34°00′30″N 117°56′41″W	500	EME	2013	
Watson Cogeneration Project	Carson	33°49′00″N 118°14′42″W	405	BP	1988	
Woodland Generation Station	Modesto	37°39′10″N 121°01′13″W	199	MID	2003	

== Nuclear ==
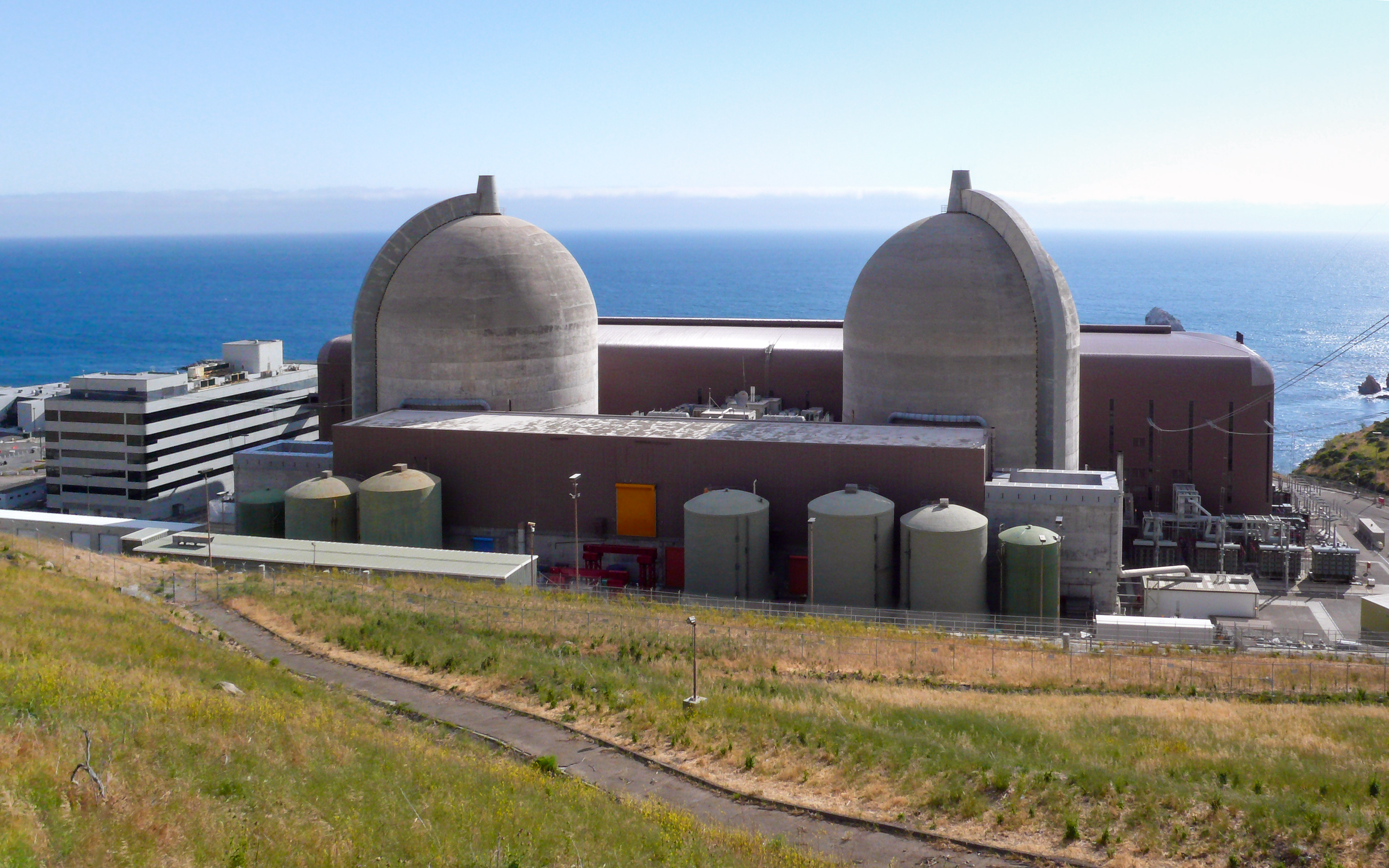
Diablo Canyon Power Plant

The Diablo Canyon Power Plant has been the only nuclear power station in California since the closure of the San Onofre Nuclear Generating Station in 2013. Due to the changing dynamics of electricity generation in California, Diablo Canyon is scheduled to be decommissioned in 2025. The Palo Verde Nuclear Generating Station (the largest power generator in the United States), which is 27% owned by California power agencies, in the neighboring state of Arizona supplies a significant amount of power to southern California.

Name	Location	Coordinates	Capacity (MW)	Owner	Type	Year	Ref
Diablo Canyon	San Luis Obispo County	35°12′39″N 120°51′22″W	2,256	PG&E	PWR	1985	
Palo Verde	Tonopah, Arizona		3,937	Southern California Edison, SCPPA, LADWP, and others	PWR	1986–1988	

== Petroleum ==
This is a list of operational petroleum-fired power stations in California.

Name	Location	Coordinates	Capacity (MW)	Owner	Fuel	Year	Ref
Oakland Power Plant	Oakland	37°47′48″N 122°16′55″W	165	Vistra Energy	Jet fuel	1980s	
Pebbly Beach Generating Station	Avalon	33°19′59″N 118°18′37″W	12.7	SCE	Diesel		

== Solar ==
=== Photovoltaic ===
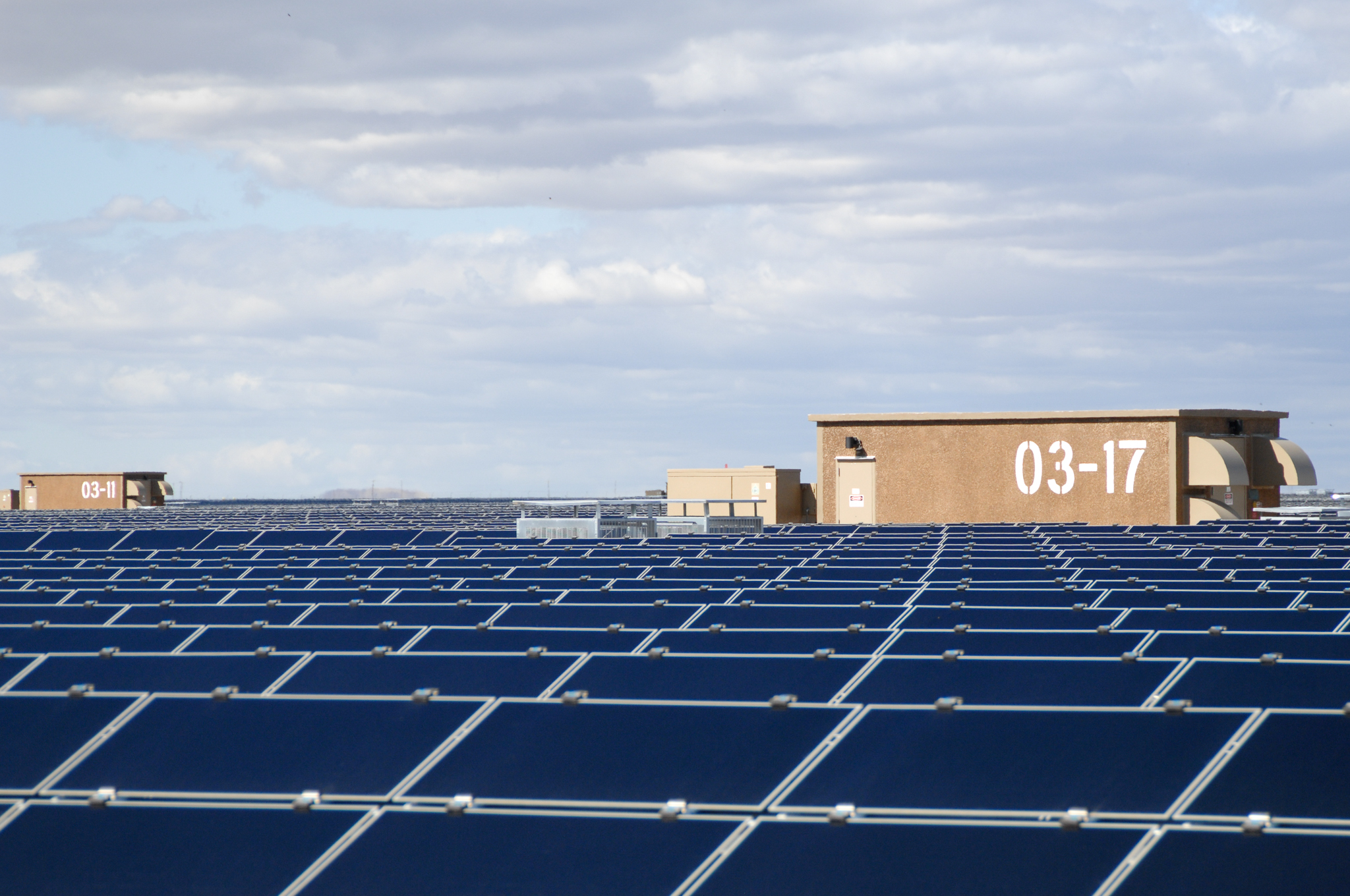
Topaz Solar Farm

This is a list of very large (>100MW) solar photovoltaic power stations in California as of January 1, 2019.

To update and expand this list, search the Energy Information Administration's plant-level data set by visiting the Electricity Data Browser. Alternatively, view the Solar Industry Association's Major Solar Projects List which is less frequently updated.

Name	Location	Coordinates	Capacity (MW_{AC})	Owner	Year	Ref
Antelope Expansion 2	Los Angeles County	34°44′45″N 118°18′35″W	105		2019	
Antelope Valley Solar Ranch	Los Angeles County	34°46′N 118°25′W	230	Exelon	2014	
Astoria Solar Project	Kern County	34°50′39″N 118°27′31″W	175		2016	
Beacon Solar Project	Kern County	35°15′25″N 118°00′47″W	250	LADWP	2017	
Bellefield	Kern County	35.06°N 118.08°W	500	Amazon. 1 GWh battery	2025	
Blythe Solar Power Project	Riverside County	33°39′N 114°43′W	235	NextEra Energy	2016	
California Flats Solar Project	Carrizo Plain	35°53′N 120°24′W	280	Capital Dynamics	2019	
California Valley Solar Ranch	Carrizo Plain	35°20′N 119°55′W	250	NRG Energy	2013	
Campo Verde Solar Project	Imperial County	32°45′N 115°43′W	139	Southern Company, Turner Renewable Energy	2013	
Catalina Solar Project	Kern County	34°55′51″N 118°20′06″W	143.2	enXco	2012	
Centinela Solar Energy Project	Imperial County	32°40′55″N 115°39′38″W	170		2013	
Desert Stateline Solar Facility	San Bernardino County	35°35′08″N 115°26′09″W	250	Southern Company, First Solar	2016	
Desert Sunlight Solar Farm	Sonoran Desert	33°49′33″N 115°24′08″W	550	NextEra Energy, GE Power, Sumitomo Group	2015	
Garland Solar Facility	Kern County	34°49′31″N 118°31′30″W	200		2016	
Great Valley Solar Farm	Fresno County	36°34′52″N 120°22′46″W	200		2018	
Henrietta Solar Project	Kings County	36°13′08″N 119°48′21″W	105		2016	
Imperial Solar Energy Center South	Imperial County	32°39′36″N 115°39′36″W	130	Tenaska	2013	
Imperial Solar Energy Center West	Imperial County	32°46′30″N 115°47′06″W	150	Tenaska	2016	
McCoy Solar Energy Project	Sonoran Desert	33°43′00″N 114°45′00″W	250	NextEra Energy	2016	
Mount Signal Solar	Imperial County	32°40′24″N 115°38′23″W	460	TerraForm Power, Capital Dynamics	2014	
Mustang Solar Project	Kings County	36°13′18″N 119°54′11″W	100		2016	
North Rosamond Solar Project	Los Angeles County	34°51′43″N 118°22′50″W	150		2019	
Panoche Valley Solar Farm	San Benito County	36°37′N 120°52′W	130	Panoche Valley Solar	2018	
Quinto Solar Project	Merced County	37°07′49″N 121°03′08″W	110		2015	
San Pablo Raceway Solar Project	Los Angeles County	34°43′26″N 118°16′47″W	100		2019	
Solar Gen 2 Facility	Imperial County	33°04′48″N 115°28′12″W	150		2014	
Solar Star	Kern County	34°49′50″N 118°23′53″W	579	BHE Renewables	2015	
Springbok Solar Farm	Kern County	35.25°N 117.96°W	260	8minutenergy	2016	
Topaz Solar Farm	Carrizo Plain	35°23′N 120°4′W	550	Berkshire Hathaway Energy	2014	
Tranquility Solar Project	Fresno County	36°37′2″N 120°23′16″W	200		2016	
Valentine Solar Project	Kern County	35°29′30″N 118°51′37″W	111.2		2019	
Willow Springs Solar Project	Los Angeles County	34°49′35″N 118°20′07″W	100		2019	
Wright Solar Project	Merced County	37°00′45″N 120°57′47″W	200		2020	

=== Thermal ===
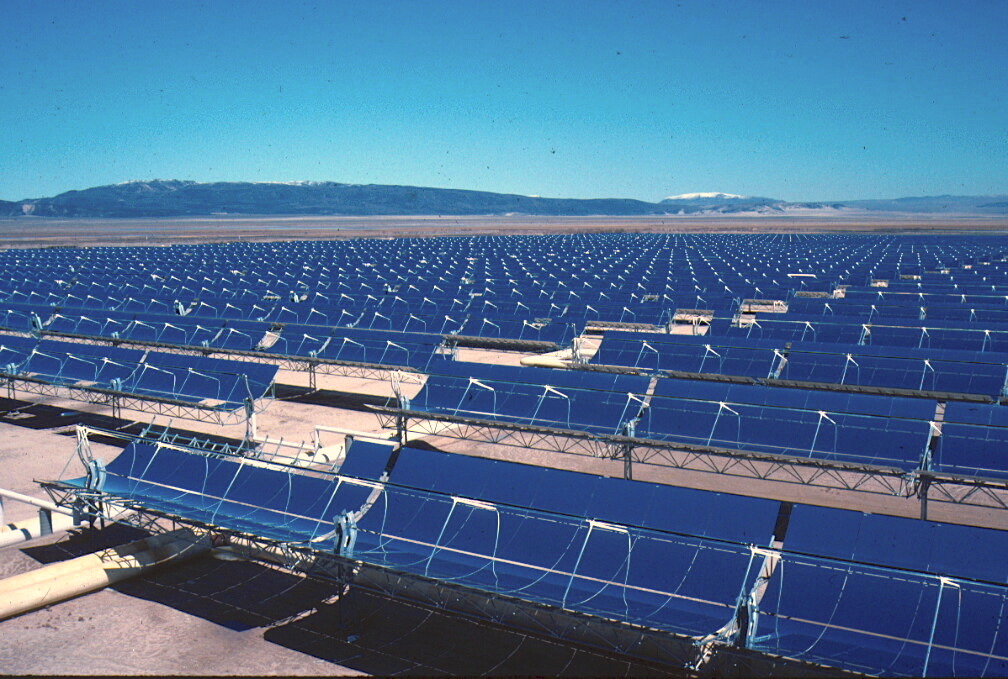
Solar Energy Generating Systems, the first solar thermal power station in California

This is a list of all operational solar thermal power stations in California.

Station	Location	Coordinates	Capacity (MW)	Owner	Type	Year	Ref
Genesis Solar Energy Project	Riverside County	33°39′54″N 114°59′41″W	250	NextEra Energy	Parabolic trough	2014	
Ivanpah Solar Power Facility	San Bernardino County	35.57°N 115.47°W	392	BrightSource Energy, NRG Energy, Google	Solar power tower	2014	
Mojave Solar Project	San Bernardino County	35°00′40″N 117°19′30″W	280	Abengoa Solar	Parabolic trough	2014	
Solar Energy Generating Systems	San Bernardino County	35°01′54″N 117°20′53″W	354 (Note: Includes 44 MW of PV)	NextEra Energy	Parabolic trough	1984	

== Wind ==
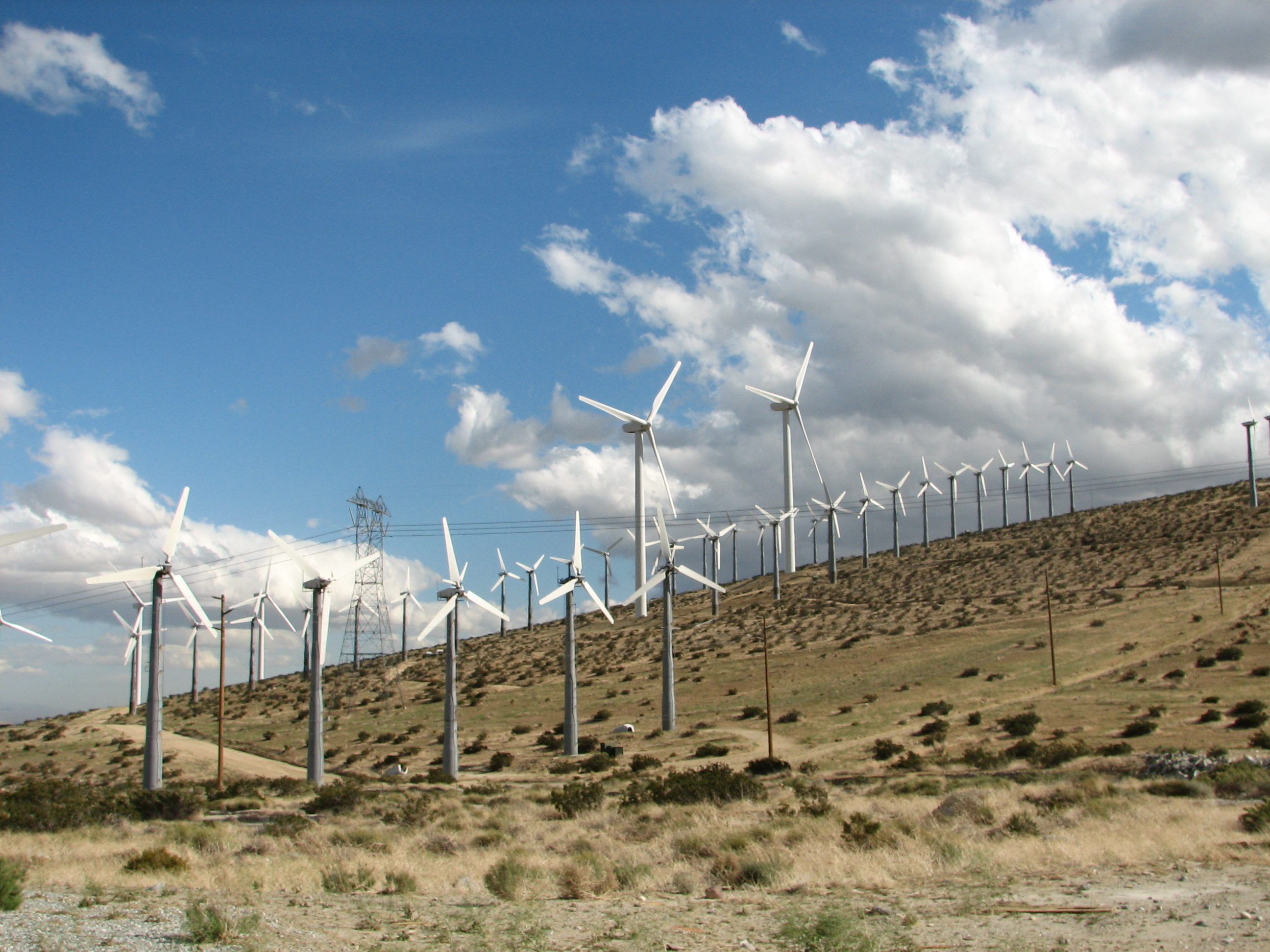
San Gorgonio Pass Wind Farm

This is a list of all operational wind farms in California.

Name	Location	Coordinates	Capacity (MW)	Year	Ref
Alta Wind Energy Center	Kern County	35°1′16″N 118°19′14″W	1,548	2011	
Altamont Pass Wind Farm (Note: Includes 5 individual wind farms as of February 2020.)	Altamont	37°42′45″N 121°33′54″W	266	1981	
Dinosaur Point Wind Farm	Merced County	37°02′50″N 121°11′42″W	17.4	1998	
Hatchet Ridge Wind Project	Shasta County	40°53′25″N 121°47′49″W	101.2	2010	
High Winds Wind Energy Center	Solano County	38°08′25″N 121°48′25″W	162	2003	
Kumeyaay Wind Farm	Campo Kumeyaay Nation	32°42′20″N 116°20′32″W	50	2005	
Manzana Wind Farm	Kern County	34°55′11″N 118°26′55″W	340.7	2013	
Montezuma Wind Energy Center	Solano County	38°09′23″N 121°47′35″W	115	2010	
Ocotillo Wind Energy Facility	Ocotillo	32°44′40″N 116°02′34″W	265.4	2012	
Pine Tree Wind Power Project	Kern County	35°14′49″N 118°10′35″W	135	2009	
San Gorgonio Pass Wind Farm (Note: Includes 29 individual wind farms as of February 2020.)	Whitewater	33°56′05″N 116°34′40″W	675.7	1982	
Shiloh Wind Power Plant	Birds Landing	38°07′33″N 121°50′03″W	520.5	2006	
Sky River Wind Farm	Kern County	35°20′42″N 118°11′09″W	239	1991	
Solano Wind Farm	Solano County	38°06′50″N 121°45′50″W	228.2	1994	
Tehachapi Pass Wind Farm (Note: Includes 37 individual wind farms as of February 2020.)	Kern County	35°04′05″N 118°15′45″W	1,244	1986	
Tule Wind Energy Project	San Diego County	32°43′17″N 116°15′44″W	143	2017	

== Under construction ==
This is a list of power stations under construction in California.

Name	Location	Coordinates	AC Capacity (MW)	Type	Completion	Notes	Ref
Big Beau Solar and Storage Project	Kern County	34°54′24″N 118°21′11″W	128	Solar farm, Battery storage	2021	Includes a 40 MW, 160 MWh of battery storage system.	
Desert Harvest Solar Project	Riverside County	33°44′22″N 115°24′02″W	150	Solar farm	2020		
Westlands Solar Park	Kings County	36°10′N 119°56′W	2,000	Solar farm	2025	Demonstration project completed in June 2016. To be gradually expanded out to 2,000 MW by 2025.	
Edwards Sanborn	Kern County		346	Solar farm, Battery storage	2022	Includes 735 MWh of battery storage system.	

== Former facilities ==
Name	Location	Coordinates	Capacity (MW)	Type	Commissioned	Decommissioned	Ref
Coolwater Generating Station	Daggett	34°51′43″N 116°51′22″W	636	Natural gas	?	January 2015	
Covanta Delano Energy	Delano	35°43′N 119°14′W	58	Biomass	?	December 2015	
Covanta Mendota Energy	Mendota	36°46′N 120°22′W	25	Biomass	?	January 2015	
Covanta Pacific Oroville	Oroville	39°29′N 121°34′W	18	Biomass	?	December 2012	
Encina Power Station	Carlsbad	33°08′11″N 117°20′13″W	965	Natural gas	1954	December 11, 2018	
Humboldt Bay Power Plant - Unit 3	Humboldt Bay	40°44′29″N 124°12′33″W	65	Nuclear (BWR)	1963	1976	
Hunters Point Power Plant	San Francisco	37.7374°N 122.3763°W	450	Natural gas + aeroderivative peaker	December 3, 1929	May 15, 2006	
Imperial Valley Resource Recovery	Imperial County	32°55′N 115°31′W	18	Biomass	January 2009	December 2010	
Inland Empire Energy Center	Sun City	33°44′20″N 117°10′11″W	819	Natural gas	2008	December 2019	
Kimberlina Solar Thermal Energy Plant	Bakersfield	35°34′06″N 119°12′06″W	5	Solar thermal (CLFR)	January 2009	September 2014	
Mandalay Generating Station	Oxnard	34°12′23″N 119°15′2″W	560	Natural gas	?	January 2018	
Morro Bay Power Plant	Morro Bay	35°22′20″N 120°51′25″W	650	Natural gas	1950s	2014	
Pittsburg Generating Station	Pittsburg	38°2′21″N 121°53′40″W	1,370	Natural gas	1954	December 2016	
Potrero Generating Station	San Francisco	37.7566°N 122.3821°W	360	Natural gas + aeroderivative peaker	c.1890	January 1, 2011	
Rancho Seco Nuclear Generating Station	Herald	38°20′43″N 121°07′18″W	917	Nuclear (PWR)	1975	2009	
Rio Bravo Jasmin Power Plant	Bakersfield	35°44′29″N 119°3′6″W	35	Coal, Petcoke	1989	December 2014	
Rio Bravo Poso Power Plant	Bakersfield	35°32′46″N 119°4′39″W	35	Coal, Petcoke	1989	2015	
San Onofre Nuclear Generating Station	San Diego County	33°22′8″N 117°33′18″W	2,254	Nuclear (PWR)	January 1, 1968	June 7, 2013	
Sodium Reactor Experiment	Simi Valley	34°14′7″N 118°42′30″W	6.5	Nuclear	July 12, 1957	February 15, 1964	
Sierra SunTower	Lancaster	34°46′0.0″N 118°8′0.0″W	5	Solar thermal (SPT)	January 2010	December 2014	
The Solar Project	Daggett	34°52′19″N 116°50′03″W	10	Solar thermal (SPT)	1982, 1995	1986, 1999	
South Bay Power Plant	Chula Vista	32°36′50″N 117°05′47″W	700	Natural gas	1960	2010	
Stockton Cogeneration Facility	Stockton	37°54′45″N 121°15′43″W	60	Coal	1988	2012	
Tracy Biomass	Tracy	37°43′N 121°29′W	23	Biomass	1990	2015	
Vernon Light and Power	Vernon		38	Diesel fuel	1933		

== See also ==
- List of dams and reservoirs in California
- List of power stations in the United States
