= Russell City Energy Center =

- Official name: Russell City Energy Center
- Country: United States
- Location: Hayward, Alameda County
- Coordinates: 37.63459°N 122.13368°W
- Status: Operational
- Construction began: September 1, 2010
- Commission date: August 8, 2013
- Owners: Calpine(75%); GE Energy Financial Services(25%)
- Operator: Calpine

Thermal power station
- Primary fuel: Natural gas
- Combined cycle?: Yes

Power generation
- Units operational: 2 × 200 MW; 1 × 235 MW
- Make and model: Siemens Westinghouse 501 FD
- Nameplate capacity: 635 MW
- Annual net output: 787 GW·h (2016)

External links
- Website: www.calpine.com/russell-city-energy-center

The Russell City Energy Center (RCEC) is a 619-megawatt natural gas-fired power station, which began operating in August 2013. It is operated by Calpine, and is located in Hayward, California. It is named for Russell City and is built on that community's former landfill site.

== History ==
In 2001, the Calpine energy corporation developed plans to build a 619 megawatt power plant, the Russell City Energy Center, at the city's former location. The plant broke ground in late 2010. The plant borders the City of Hayward Waste Water Pollution Control Facility and property owned by East Bay Discharge Authority near the Don Edwards San Francisco Bay National Wildlife Refuge and the Hayward Regional Shoreline.

The Russell City Energy Center is the nation’s first power plant to receive a federal air permit that includes a voluntary limit on greenhouse gas emissions.

A Federal Appeals Court, in May 2012, denied an environmental claim by nearby Chabot College.

The plant went online in August 2013, and its full output of electricity is sold to Pacific Gas and Electric Company under a 10-year contract. Calpine Corporation owns 75% of the plant's peak dispatchable capacity, or 464 megawatts, and GE Energy Financial Services owns the balance.

On May 27, 2021, an explosion at the plant shut down energy production.

== Design and specifications ==
The two CTGs output the power at 15 kV, the STG at 18 kV, output which is connected to individual oil-filled generator step-up transformers, increasing voltage to 230 kV. The auxiliary equipment motors are operated at 4,160 volts and the balance power distribution is operated at 480 volts and 277 volts for the lighting loads.

== See also ==
- List of power stations in California
- Los Esteros Critical Energy Facility, operated by Calpine in San Jose
