= Mount Signal Solar =

Photovoltaic power station in Imperial County, California

- Country: United States
- Location: Calexico, Imperial County, California
- Coordinates: 32°40′24″N 115°38′23″W
- Status: Units 1 & 3 operational
- Commission date: May 2014 (MS1); July 2018 (MS3); 2020 (MS2)
- Construction cost: $365 million (Unit 1)
- Operators: TerraForm Power (MS1); Capital Dynamics (MS3)

Solar farm
- Type: Flat-panel PV
- Site area: 1,940 acres (790 ha) (MS1); 2,000 acres (810 ha) (MS3)

Power generation
- Units operational: 3 million FS Series 3 (MS1); 2.8 million FS Series 4 (MS2)
- Nameplate capacity: 794 MW_{p}, 614 MW_{AC}
- Capacity factor: 29.7% (average 2015–2017, MS1)
- Annual net output: 1,200 GW·h

Mount Signal Solar, also known as Imperial Valley Solar Project, is a 794 MW_{p} (614 MW_{AC}) photovoltaic power station west of Calexico, California, United States, in the southern Imperial Valley, near the Mexican border. The facility was developed and constructed by 8minutenergy Renewables in three phases, with two completed as of 2018, and the third in 2020. It is one of the world's largest PV solar farms, with a capacity of about 800 MW_{p} (600 MW_{AC}). The project has been supported by several environmental groups, as the power station was built on low-productivity farmland.

== History ==
Originally the project was called SES Solar Two, was to be of Stirling engine design, and was approved by California Energy Commission on September 29, 2010. AES Solar changed the name to Imperial Valley Solar, but later notified the commission on June 30, 2011 of its intention to no longer pursue the project. AES Solar and 8minuteenergy Renewables subsequently announced on February 17, 2012 their plan to revive the project, changing the technology from solar thermal to photovoltaic, and changing the project name to Mount Signal Solar.

The first phase started construction in 2012 and went online in 2014, providing 266 MW_{p} (206 MW_{AC}) to San Diego Gas & Electric under a 25-year agreement. More than 3 million thin-film CdTe photovoltaic modules from First Solar and 138 skids designed and manufactured by Elettronica Santerno are used. It was the world's largest solar project using single-axis trackers to follow the path of the sun upon completion. The cost of this first unit was $365 million.

Phases two and three consist of 200 MW_{p} and 328 MW_{p} of power, respectively, on 3,200 acres (1,300 ha) contracted to Southern California Edison. Phase 2 was commissioned in January 2020, while Phase 3 went online in July 2018. Phase 3 consists of 2.8 million Series 4 thin film panels from First Solar.

== Project units ==
The Mount Signal Solar Farm consists of three units, or construction phases:

- Mount Signal 1 – a 266 MW_{DC} (206 MW_{AC}) solar power station using photovoltaics. Construction on the 1,940-acre (790 ha) site began in November 2012 and was completed in May 2014.
- Mount Signal 2 – 200 MW_{DC} (154 MW_{AC}) solar power station also using photovoltaics on approximately 1,260 acres (510 ha) which was commissioned in January 2020.
- Mount Signal 3 – a 328 MW_{DC} (254 MW_{AC}) solar power station using photovoltaics on 2,000 acres (810 ha) completed in July 2018. Solar PV manufacturer First Solar provided its Series 4 thin-film solar panels for the project, and Nextpower, then known as Nextracker, supplied its NX Horizon smart solar tracker systems.

== Electricity production ==
Mount Signal 1 nameplate capacities: 260 MW_{dc}, 206 MW_{ac}
Annual net output: 537 GW·h (avg 2015–2017)
Capacity factor: 29.7%

Generation (MW·h) of Mount Signal 1
| Year | Jan | Feb | Mar | Apr | May | Jun | Jul | Aug | Sep | Oct | Nov | Dec | Total |
|---|---|---|---|---|---|---|---|---|---|---|---|---|---|
| 2013 | | | | | | | | | | | 14,324 | 22,836 | 37,160 |
| 2014 | 22,740 | 28,996 | 52,995 | 50,216 | 54,049 | 45,771 | 41,333 | 54,391 | 49,421 | 41,741 | 34,314 | 24,588 | 500,555 |
| 2015 | 26,785 | 36,002 | 48,988 | 54,670 | 57,135 | 57,622 | 58,306 | 56,135 | 41,832 | 40,183 | 32,880 | 28,148 | 538,685 |
| 2016 | 28,732 | 39,221 | 45,763 | 51,495 | 62,321 | 60,274 | 60,762 | 54,169 | 45,606 | 39,605 | 28,038 | 20,539 | 536,525 |
| 2017 | 21,264 | 23,751 | 44,398 | 47,373 | 60,412 | 65,437 | 59,589 | 55,128 | 51,371 | 47,328 | 29,254 | 30,779 | 536,083 |

== See also ==
- Imperial Solar Energy Center West
- Imperial Solar Energy Center South
- Solar power in California
