= California Flats Solar Project =

Photovoltaic power station in California, US

- Country: United States
- Location: Monterey County, California
- Coordinates: 35°53′N 120°24′W
- Status: complete
- Construction began: 2016
- Commission date: April 2019
- Owner: Capital Dynamics

Solar farm
- Type: Flat-panel PV
- Site area: 2,900 acres (1,174 ha)

Power generation
- Nameplate capacity: 280 MW_{AC} (when completed)

The California Flats Solar Project is a 280 megawatt (MW_{AC}) photovoltaic power station on Hearst Communications' Jack Ranch in the Cholame Hills area of southeastern Monterey County, California, near the San Luis Obispo, Kings, and Fresno County borders in Central California.

The project was financed by California Flats Solar LLC, a subsidiary of First Solar, and will use the company's thin-film technology. Construction began in 2016. The project was sold to Swiss asset-management outfit Capital Dynamics in August 2017. The first 130 MW of production went online in November 2017 and the projected was completed in spring 2019.

The plant has two power purchase agreements: Apple Inc. has a 25-year deal for 130 MW to power its California operations, and Pacific Gas and Electric Company is purchasing 150 MW. Apple installs a 60 MW storage facility at the site.

== Electricity production ==
Total Facility Generation (Annual Sum from Both Units Below)
Year	Total Annual MW·h
2017	20,432
2018	361,793
2019	467,106 (ytd)

Generation (MW·h) of CA Flats Solar 130 LLC
Year	Jan	Feb	Mar	Apr	May	Jun	Jul	Aug	Sep	Oct	Nov	Dec	Total
2017											1,547	18,885	20,432
2018	16,764	24,557	25,427	36,031	39,568	43,990	41,733	39,108	33,300	27,071	18,010	16,234	361,793
2019	15,463	17,739	26,084	26,815	33,002	42,126	43,995	40,823					246,047 (ytd)

Generation (MW·h) of CA Flats Solar 150 LLC
Year	Jan	Feb	Mar	Apr	May	Jun	Jul	Aug	Sep	Oct	Nov	Dec	Total
2019		15,563	26,815	26,084	28,349	38,055	41,822	44,371					221,059 (ytd)

== See also ==
- Solar power in California
