= Russell City, California =

- Former settlement
- Location in California
- Coordinates: 37°38′50″N 122°07′30″W
- Country: United States
- State: California
- County: Alameda
- City: Hayward
- Elevation: 16 ft (5 m)

Russell City (also known as Russell) was an unincorporated community in Alameda County, California, United States, approximately 10 miles (16 km) south of Oakland in present-day Hayward. The land is at an elevation of 16 feet (5 m). Russell City existed from 1853 until 1964, when the last of the residents—most of whom were African American and Latino—were forced out to make way for an industrial park, with such parks dominating the area to this day. While the residents fought removal, many of the buildings were destroyed in arson fires.

== History ==
Most sources indicate that Russell City was named in 1853 after Joel Russell, a New England (Maine) teacher who came to California during the Gold Rush. Some sources say the area was named after Frederick James Russell, who laid out the town in 1907. Russell City was an arrival point for immigrants to the San Francisco Bay Area, initially inhabited primarily by Danish immigrants.

Joel Russell's sons inherited the property upon their father's death in 1888, and began promoting the location—now known as "Russell City"—to refugees of the San Francisco earthquake of 1906 promoting it as "The New City on San Francisco Bay." Russell City Road was the primary pathway to and from the town. By 1908, 700 lots had been sold—but only one be a former San Francisco resident.

=== Population boom (1940-1950) ===
By World War II, African Americans and Latinos formed the majority of city residents. In particular, many Latino families were from Mexico and Puerto Rico, along with some braceros and other shipyard workers at Todd Shipyards and Kaiser Shipyards in Richmond. Ernesto Nava, son of the Mexican revolutionary leader Pancho Villa, lived in Russell City and was one of the last residents to leave. On the other hand, significant numbers of African Americans moved there from the South fleeing Jim Crow laws and in search of wartime jobs. This population boom mirrored other parts of the United States at this time and is referred to as the Second Great Migration. It is notable that while surrounding cities like Oakland and Hayward had housing restrictions based on race, Russell City did not.

==== Daily life ====
Although the city was never incorporated and did not have basic utilities (like sanitation plumbing), Russell City was self-governed. There were no elected officials, although Buster Brooks and Chauncey Pryor were considered the unofficial mayor and unofficial vice mayor. Kenneth Garcia was the Russell City representative at the city of Hayward Chamber of Commerce. Brooks, Garcia, and Pryor all worked for the Russell City Fire Department, where Garcia also served as Chief. Residents pitched in to buy the fire truck, and most male residents formed the rest of the department squad.

Russell City was home to seven churches of various dominations, including Apostolic, Baptist, and Catholic. The town also included a convenience store, feed store, hotel, market, and gas station.

Leona "Nona" Alves, a Black woman, owned and operated Ideal Dining Room, a restaurant and dance hall.

==== West Coast blues music ====
Once known as a "blues capital," Russell City had a history of blues music, and this heritage is the basis for the annual Hayward/Russell City Blues Festival. Notable Black artists of the day, including Big Mama Thornton, Jimmy McCracklin, Jimmy Witherspoon, Billy Dunn, among others performed at Ideal Dining Room and The Country Club.

=== The city's decline and demolition (1950s-1960s) ===
To outsiders, Russell City had a reputation for being crime-ridden and impoverished. This perception led surrounding local governments to not create infrastructure for the area, leaving residents to fend for themselves. For instance, Alameda County declined to annex Russell City or to provide sanitation and fire services. There was no town water or sewage system, and not all homes had indoor plumbing. In 1945, Alameda County officials declined a request to fund paved roads and later declined to install a water main.

By the mid-1950s, all Russell City streets were renamed by Alameda County.

In the 1950s, Hayward declared the community blighted at a time when it occupied 12 square blocks and had approximately 1,400 residents. In the early 1960s, the city began purchasing properties and there was a spate of arson fires, including the destruction of the Russell City Hotel in 1966 and the Country Club in 1964. In 1964, the town was annexed by Hayward, the remaining residents evicted under eminent domain, and the land was used for an industrial park, with the last town buildings being cleared in 1966.

A mural at A Street and Maple Court in Hayward and markers near the shoreline commemorate Russell City.

== Russell City Energy Center ==
The Russell City Energy Center, a natural gas fueled power plant, opened in 2013 within the city's former boundaries.

== Fight for reparations ==
The City of Hayward issued a formal apology on November 16, 2021, and launched the Russell City Restorative Justice Project in June 2022.

In August of 2026, the Alameda County Board of Supervisors approved a landmark distribution plan for the Russell City Redress Fund. Alameda County in California and the City of Hayward to allocate approximately $1.3 to $1.4 million.

== See also ==
- African Americans in the East Bay (San Francisco Bay Area)
