= Valley Generating Station =

Natural gas-fired power station in Los Angeles, California

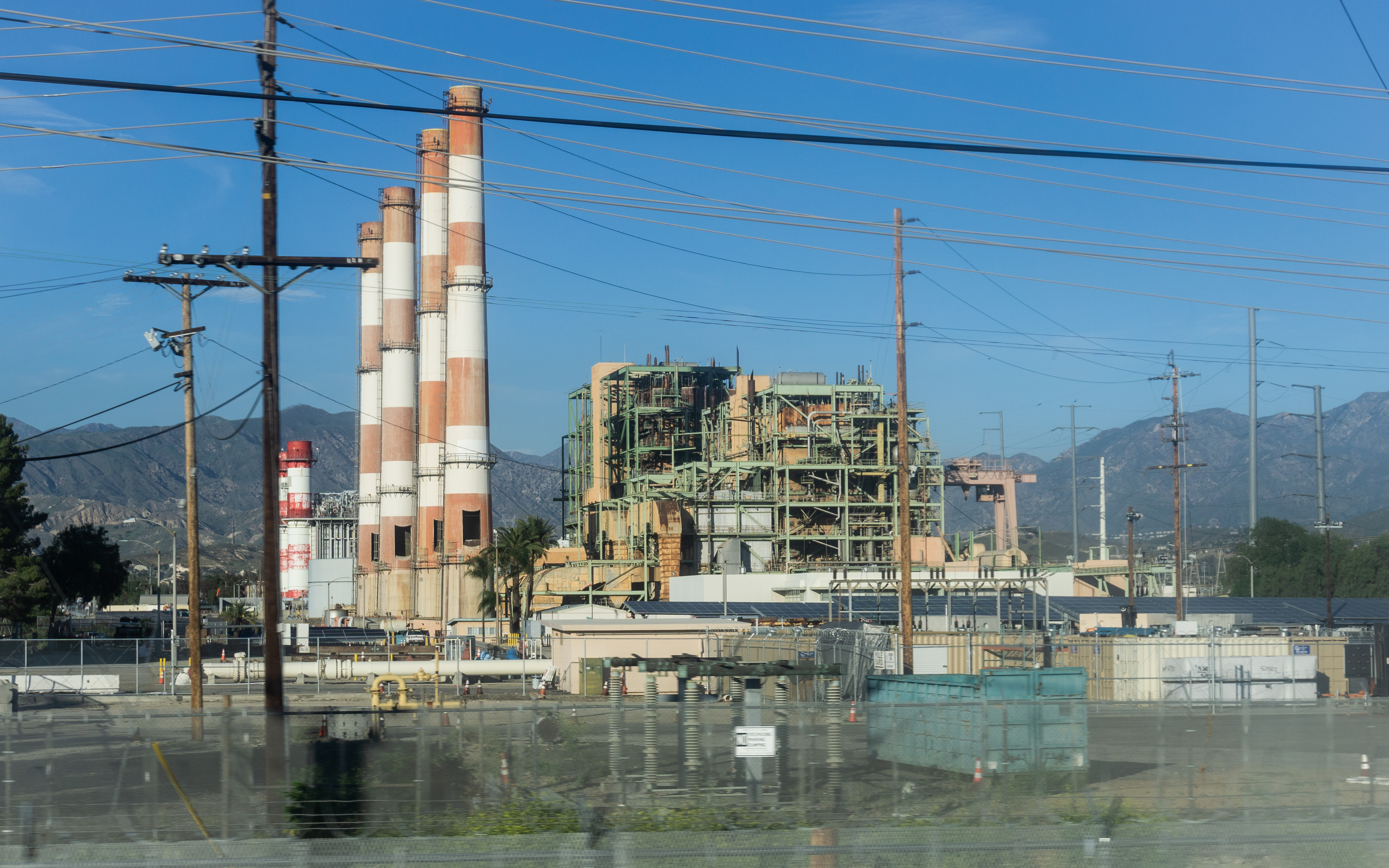
- The Valley Steam Plant as viewed from a passing Metrolink train
- Official name: Valley Steam Plant
- Country: United States
- Location: Sun Valley, Los Angeles, California
- Coordinates: 34°14′39″N 118°23′33″W
- Status: Operational
- Construction began: 1953
- Commission date: 1953
- Owner: LADWP
- Operator: LADWP

Thermal power station
- Primary fuel: Natural gas
- Combined cycle?: Yes

Power generation
- Nameplate capacity: 690.5 MW
- Annual net output: 1,492 GWh (2018)

External links
- Commons: Related media on Commons

The Valley Generating Station is a natural gas-fired power station located in Sun Valley, Los Angeles, California.

== Description ==
The Valley Steam Plant was constructed in 1953 by the Los Angeles Department of Water and Power (LADWP) to provide electricity for Greater Los Angeles. Built on 150 acres (61 ha) in Sun Valley at cost of $80,000,000, it was powered by dual fuel (gas or oil) boilers and had four steam turbines generating a total of 512 MW.

Between 2001 and 2004, the power station was modernized with the construction of two GE Frame 7FA combustion turbines, two Alstom heat recovery steam generators, and a single GE steam turbine. It was renamed the Valley Generating Station. Modernization of the then 50-year old power station was a major component of the LADWP's Integrated Resource Plan, which had been approved by the Los Angeles City Council in 2000. The project was completed on April 30, 2004.

The site still contains the original turbine units with their four tall stacks which are now decommissioned, the newer units (6 and 7) with two smaller stacks are located directly east of the old units (1-4), Demolition of the old units including the large red and white stacks is underway as of July 2024. As of May 18, 2026 only one from the 3 stacks remain as the demolition process continues until November 2026.

== Methane leak ==
On August 26, 2020, the South Coast Air Quality Management District (SCAQMD) learned of an ongoing methane leak at the Valley Generating Station. An inspector was dispatched to the site that evening and again the next day as well as on September 2. Methane emissions were detected coming from the vents of two natural gas compressors.

In response to the leak, on August 27, compressor A, which had been leaking the most, was taken offline entirely after increasing the supply pressure and keeping compressor B on standby, reducing the methane leak by 60% as of August 28. Compressor A was disassembled and its packing seals were replaced; after repairs were completed on August 31, the rate of leakage from compressor A was significantly reduced from about 90 kg/hour to 3 to 6 kg/hour; the leak was reduced by 95% as of Tuesday September 1. Repairs to compressor B were completed on September 5 with a reduction from 60 kg/hour to 12 kg/hour. Inspectors returned to the facility on a weekly basis and verified that the LADWP had repaired the leaking equipment.

On January 7, 2021, the SCAQMD issued a Notice of Violation of Rule 3002 Section E to the LADWP for failure to maintain compressors for natural gas fueled turbines. The LADWP currently has an emissions monitoring system at the facility and the SCAQMD is working with the LADWP to provide technical support on an additional air monitoring system to detect methane.

It would later be revealed that the facility had been leaking methane gas for at least two years. City council president Nury Martinez who represents the district where the surrounding community lies said she was "furious" at the news of the leak and in November, 2020, the Los Angeles City Council voted unanimously to create a timeline to shut down the plant. In December, the Parris Law Firm, which was behind a suit related to the 2015 Aliso Canyon gas leak, filed a class-action lawsuit on behalf of local residents against the LADWP seeking financial damages and remedies.

== See also ==
- List of power stations in California
- California Air Resources Board
