= Palo Verde Nuclear Generating Station =

Nuclear power plant located near Tonopah, Arizona

Palo Verde Generating Station
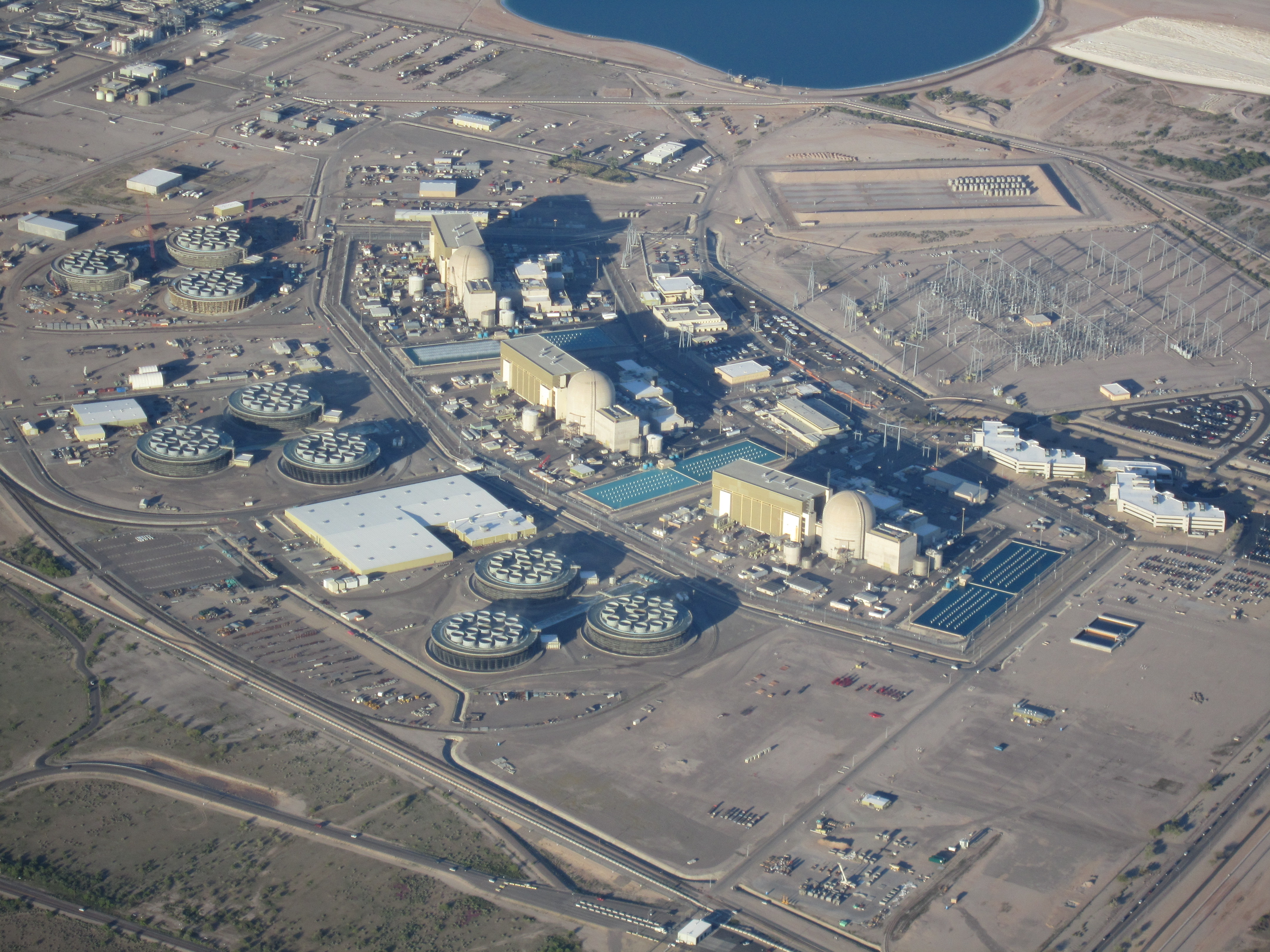
- The Palo Verde Generating Station, aerial view.
- Official name: Palo Verde Generating Station
- Country: United States
- Location: Tonopah, Arizona
- Coordinates: 33°23′21″N 112°51′54″W
- Status: Operational
- Construction began: Unit 1: 25 May 1976; Unit 2: 1 June 1976; Unit 3: 1 June 1976
- Commission date: Unit 1: 28 January 1986 (40 years ago); Unit 2: 19 September 1986 (40 years ago); Unit 3: 8 January 1988 (38 years ago)
- Construction cost: $5.9 billion (1986 USD) ($14.3 billion in 2024 dollars)
- Owners: Arizona Public Service (29.1%); Salt River Project (20.2%); El Paso Electric (15.8%); So. California Edison (15.8%); PNM Resources (7.5%); SCPPA (5.9%); LADWP (5.7%)
- Operator: Arizona Public Service

Nuclear power station
- Reactor type: PWR
- Reactor supplier: Combustion Engineering
- Cooling towers: 9 × Mechanical Draft (Note: 9 × concentric low-profile precast concrete cooling towers (3 towers per unit), each with 16 × individual induced-draft cooling cells, for a total of 144 induced-draft cooling cells. Cooling towers are Marley Class 700 cross-flow induced-draft models, with Bechtel-constructed foundations and basins. Dimensions are 303 feet (92 m) diameter × 46 feet (14 m) height.)
- Cooling source: Treated sewage
- Thermal capacity: 3 × 3990 MW_{th}

Power generation
- Units operational: 3 × 1400 MWe
- Make and model: CE80 2-loop (DRYAMB)
- Units cancelled: 2 × 1270 MWe
- Nameplate capacity: 3937 MW
- Capacity factor: 92.55% (2017); 82.80% (lifetime)
- Annual net output: 31,920 GWh (2019)

External links
- Website: Palo Verde Generating Station
- Commons: Related media on Commons

The Palo Verde Generating Station is a nuclear power plant located near Tonopah, Arizona about 45 miles (72 km) west of downtown Phoenix. Palo Verde generates the second most electricity of any power plant in the United States per year, and is the second largest power plant by net generation as of 2021. Palo Verde has the third-highest rated capacity of any US power plant. It is a critical asset to the Southwest, generating approximately 32 million megawatt-hours annually.

Its average electric power production is about 3.3 gigawatts (GW), serving about four million people. Arizona Public Service (APS) owns 29.1% of, and operates the plant. Its other owners are the Salt River Project (20.2%), the El Paso Electric Company (15.8%), Southern California Edison (15.8%), PNM Resources (7.5%), the Southern California Public Power Authority (5.9%), and the Los Angeles Department of Water and Power (5.7%). APS was granted a 20-year license extension to operate through 2045 for Unit 1, 2046 for Unit 2, and 2047 for Unit 3, with the option to submit a subsequent license renewal application for extended operation.

The Palo Verde Generating Station, lying in the Northeastern Sonoran Desert, is the only large nuclear power plant in the world that is not near a large body of water. The power plant cools and condenses the steam that it produces by using treated sewage water from several nearby cities and towns.

== Description ==
The Palo Verde Generating Station is located on 4,000 acres (1,600 ha) of land, and it consists of three pressurized water reactors, each with an original capacity to produce 1.27 GW of electric power. After a power up-rate, each reactor is able to produce 1.4 GW of electric power. The usual power production capacity is about 70 to 95 percent of this. This nuclear power plant is a major source of electric power for the densely populated parts of Southern Arizona, Southern California, and Central New Mexico e.g. the Phoenix, and Tucson, Arizona; Albuquerque, New Mexico; Las Vegas, Nevada; Los Angeles, and San Diego, California metropolitan areas.

The Palo Verde Generating Station produces about 35 percent of the electric power that is generated in Arizona. It became fully operational by 1988, took twelve years to build and cost about $5.9 billion. The power plant employs about 2,055 full-time employees.

The Palo Verde Generating Station supplied electricity at an operating cost (including fuel and maintenance) of 4.3 cents per kilowatt-hour in 2015. In 2002, Palo Verde supplied electricity at 1.33 cents per kilowatt-hour; that price was cheaper than the cost of coal (2.26 cents per kW·h) or natural gas (4.54 cents per kW·h) in the region, but more expensive than hydroelectric power (0.63 cents per kW·h). Also in 2002, the wholesale value of the electricity produced was 2.5 cents per kW·h. By 2007, the wholesale value of electricity at the Palo Verde Generating Station was 6.33 cents per kW·h.

At the time of its 2011 license renewal, the Arizona Public Service Company reported that since its commissioning, Palo Verde's electricity production had offset the emission of almost 484 million metric tons of carbon dioxide (the equivalent of taking up to 84 million cars off the road for one year); more than 253,000 metric tons of sulfur dioxide; and 618,000 metric tons of nitrogen oxide. The company noted, "If Palo Verde were to cease operation at the end of the original license, replacement cost of natural gas generation—the least expensive alternative—would total $36 billion over the 20-year license renewal period."

Bechtel Power Corporation was the Architect/Engineer/Constructor for the facility initially under the direction of the Arizona Nuclear Power Project (a joint APS/SRP endeavor), later managed exclusively by Arizona Public Service. Edwin E. Van Brunt was the key APS executive in charge of engineering, construction, and early operations of the plant. William G. Bingham was the Bechtel Chief Engineer for the project. Arthur von Boennighausen was one of the Owner's Representatives for Arizona Public Service.

At its location in the Arizona desert, Palo Verde is the only nuclear generating facility in the world that is not located adjacent to a large body of above-ground water. The facility evaporates water from the treated sewage of several nearby municipalities to meet its cooling needs. Up to 26×10^{9} US gallons (9.8×10^{7} m^{3}) of treated water are evaporated each year. This water represents about 25% of the annual overdraft of the Arizona Department of Water Resources Phoenix Active Management Area. At the nuclear plant site, the wastewater is further treated and stored in an 85-acre (34 ha) reservoir and a 45-acre (18 ha) reservoir for use in the plant's wet cooling towers.

The nuclear power heated steam system for each unit was designed and supplied by Combustion Engineering, designated the System 80 standard design–a predecessor of the newer standard System 80+ design. Each primary system originally supplied 3.817 GW of thermal power to the secondary (steam) side of each plant. The design is a so-called 2 × 4, with each of four main reactor coolant pumps circulating more than 60,000 gallons per minute of primary-side water through 2 large steam generators.

The main turbine generators were supplied by General Electric. When installed, they were the largest in the world, capable of generating 1.447 GW of electricity each. They remain the largest 60 Hz turbine generators. Unlike most multi-unit nuclear power plants, each unit at Palo Verde is an independent power plant, sharing only a few minor systems. The reactor containment buildings are some of the largest in the world at about 2.6 million cubic feet (74,000 m^{3}) enclosed. The three containment domes over the reactors are made of 4-foot (1.2 m) thick concrete.

The facility's design incorporates features to enhance safety by addressing issues identified earlier in the operation of commercial nuclear reactors. The design is also one of the most spacious internally, providing exceptional room for the conduct of operations and maintenance by the operating staff.

The Palo Verde 500 kV switchyard is a key point in the western states' power grid and is used as a reference point in the pricing of electricity across the southwest United States. Many 500 kV power lines from companies like Southern California Edison and San Diego Gas & Electric send power generated at the plant to Los Angeles and San Diego via Path 46, respectively. In addition, due to both the strategic interconnections of the substation and the large size of the generating station, the Western Electricity Coordinating Council considers a simultaneous loss of 2 of the 3 units the worst-case contingency for system stability.

The owners applied for a construction permit for two additional units in the late 1970s. These units were cancelled for economic-risk reasons before the permits were issued. Those two additional units would not have been on the same geometric arc as the three existing units; instead, they would have been arranged south of Unit 3 on a north–south axis.

The existing units are the only commercial reactors in use in the United States that were engineered to operate on 100% MOX fuel cores. Because nuclear fuel is not reprocessed in the United States, the reactors have always operated on fresh UOX fuel.

== Electricity production ==
Generation (MWh) of Palo Verde Nuclear Generating Station
Year	Jan	Feb	Mar	Apr	May	Jun	Jul	Aug	Sep	Oct	Nov	Dec	Annual (Total)
2001	2,733,255	2,186,021	2,753,990	1,837,828	2,266,571	2,723,830	2,700,619	2,656,410	2,616,290	1,200,058	2,262,870	2,786,334	28,724,076
2002	2,844,319	2,566,694	2,343,806	2,169,710	2,819,293	2,717,774	2,792,098	2,793,709	2,615,410	1,879,761	2,506,794	2,812,543	30,861,911
2003	2,819,428	2,545,411	2,560,167	1,801,122	2,742,138	2,499,445	2,603,529	2,485,784	2,574,447	1,849,173	1,808,579	2,291,830	28,581,053
2004	2,887,529	2,155,261	2,338,518	1,945,079	2,470,274	1,975,115	2,654,962	2,777,407	2,691,530	1,892,961	1,804,086	2,519,887	28,112,609
2005	2,818,173	2,193,542	2,709,934	1,788,261	1,790,087	1,985,957	2,549,613	2,114,828	2,712,381	1,317,335	1,860,601	1,966,734	25,807,446
2006	2,102,482	1,891,323	1,917,006	779,151	1,498,282	1,837,766	2,357,606	2,848,844	2,361,135	1,209,288	2,299,443	2,909,905	24,012,231
2007	2,750,069	2,266,482	2,884,634	2,224,318	2,333,073	1,785,424	2,115,062	2,842,093	2,665,811	1,390,707	1,566,483	1,958,235	26,782,391
2008	2,300,564	2,782,885	2,871,543	1,904,539	1,954,901	2,518,897	2,927,288	2,930,748	2,576,681	2,047,219	1,945,240	2,489,991	29,250,496
2009	2,981,356	2,694,725	2,889,458	2,015,965	2,037,065	2,867,482	2,938,675	2,946,906	2,855,935	2,035,531	1,908,624	2,490,129	30,661,851
2010	2,934,812	2,688,283	2,503,706	1,972,518	2,155,910	2,782,251	2,931,945	2,924,979	2,850,591	1,994,112	2,483,005	2,977,823	31,199,935
2011	2,846,407	2,688,308	2,879,107	1,929,763	2,696,520	2,857,179	2,934,406	2,625,511	2,807,736	2,123,695	1,927,608	2,961,623	31,277,863
2012	2,958,862	2,697,058	2,453,084	2,240,082	2,952,974	2,834,687	2,830,932	2,898,669	2,799,232	1,860,622	2,437,417	2,970,297	31,933,916
2013	2,859,327	2,684,221	2,897,191	1,924,725	2,945,412	2,846,469	2,892,416	2,930,489	2,842,526	2,094,710	1,976,796	2,536,798	31,431,080
2014	2,976,752	2,685,783	2,967,442	2,027,646	2,675,472	2,847,603	2,926,652	2,910,288	2,831,567	2,280,182	2,218,273	2,973,257	32,320,917
2015	2,973,590	2,682,794	2,967,724	2,006,657	2,764,144	2,849,011	2,944,546	2,928,742	2,840,235	2,244,863	2,337,318	2,985,971	32,525,595
2016	3,002,325	2,793,423	3,007,729	2,159,340	2,393,507	2,839,398	2,896,109	2,938,674	2,507,329	2,196,021	2,660,578	2,983,044	32,377,477
2017	2,980,017	2,683,743	2,969,041	2,122,133	2,350,826	2,813,333	2,853,442	2,934,537	2,852,833	2,162,542	2,633,429	2,984,262	32,340,138
2018	2,984,031	2,556,051	2,977,426	1,962,606	2,630,253	2,750,299	2,730,309	2,923,384	2,807,555	2,101,637	1,904,189	2,769,519	31,097,259
2019	2,978,263	2,686,344	2,966,738	2,063,363	2,643,579	2,853,989	2,936,057	2,781,532	2,838,796	2,027,695	2,173,732	2,970,280	31,920,368
2020	2,975,994	2,491,613	2,796,184	1,999,298	2,769,259	2,851,559	2,929,069	2,921,071	2,846,308	2,243,169	1,915,601	2,813,308	31,552,433
2021	2,976,208	2,537,131	2,938,412	2,203,284	2,086,474	2,853,333	2,799,348	2,932,501	2,818,767	2,186,775	2,474,139	2,823,490	31,629,862
2022	2,738,935	2,459,415	2,972,667	2,145,546	2,472,513	2,856,978	2,933,199	2,930,036	2,841,357	2,185,283	2,419,165	2,987,699	31,942,793
2023	2,985,901	2,683,497	2,916,012	1,835,076	2,201,347	2,735,889	2,875,640	2,857,201	2,847,983	2,150,049	2,447,830	2,986,165	31,522,590
2024	2,987,772	2,735,638	2,972,156	2,056,877	2,541,098	2,850,484	2,922,919	2,929,713	2,855,785	2,092,398	2,461,180	2,982,098	32,388,118
2025	2,984,519	2,689,518	2,874,833	1,849,084	2,580,287	2,848,268	2,932,359	2,924,301	2,825,498	2,069,491	1,921,307	2,822,343	31,321,808
2026	3,080,610	2,658,576	2,545,389	1,898,335	2,679,367	2,829,484	2,911,760	2,905,813					--

== Security ==
Palo Verde was of such strategic importance that it and Phoenix were purported to be target locations in war plans of the Soviet Union during the Cold War. In March 2003, National Guard troops were dispatched to protect the site during the launch of the Iraq War amidst fears of a terrorist attack.

The site and the nearby town of Tonopah remain a focus of homeland security, ranking in importance with Arizona's major cities, military bases, ports of entry, and tourist sites.

As in all nuclear power plants in the United States, security guards working there are armed with rifles. They check identification and search vehicles entering the plant. Other security measures protect the reactors, including X-ray machines, explosive "sniffers", and heavy guarded turnstiles that require special identification to open.

On 2 November 2007, a pipe with gunpowder residue was found in the bed of a contract worker's pickup truck during normal screening of vehicles. It was confirmed by the local police to contain explosives. Arizona Public Service then initiated a seven-hour security lockdown of the plant, allowing no one to enter or exit the plant. The site declared a Notification of Unusual Event, which is the lowest of four Emergency Plan event classifications.

On the nights of September 29 and September 30, 2019, the airspace over the facility was violated by aerial drones. On the first night, five or six drones were reported to be flying around Unit 3, which houses one of the site's reactors. At least four were reported during the second incursion on September 30. Subsequent investigations involved the Nuclear Regulatory Commission, the FBI, the Department of Homeland Security, the Federal Aviation Administration and local law enforcement. However the identity of the operator or operators, and the purpose of the incursions remains unknown.

== Safety concerns ==
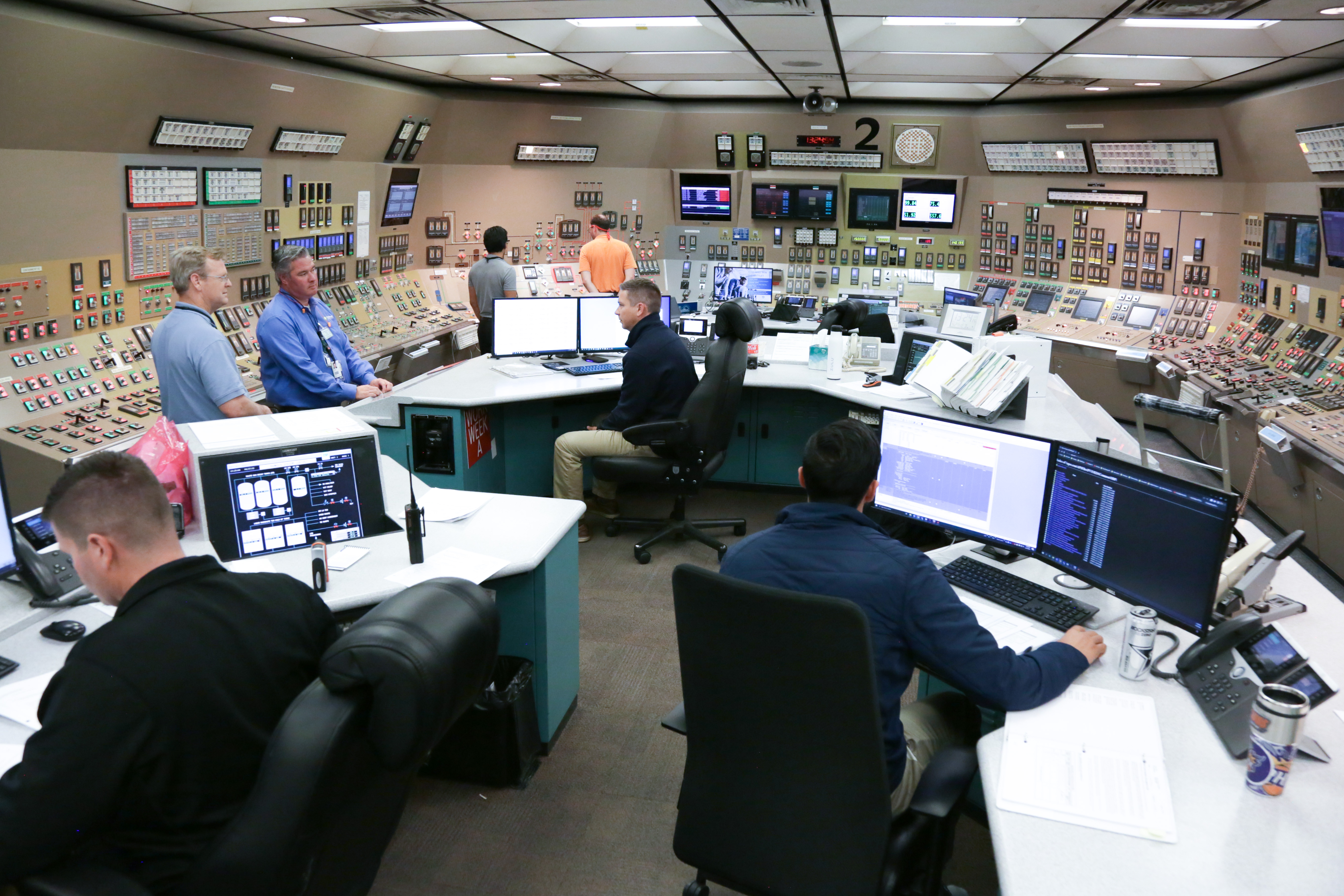
Control room at the station

In an Arizona Republic article dated February 22, 2007, it was announced that the Institute of Nuclear Power Operations (INPO) had decided to place Palo Verde into Category 4, making it one of the most closely monitored nuclear power plants in the United States. The decision was made after the INPO discovered that electrical relays in a diesel generator did not function during tests in July and September 2006.

The finding came as the "final straw" for INPO, after Palo Verde had several citations over safety concerns and violations over the preceding years, starting with the finding of a 'dry pipe' in the plant's emergency core-cooling system in 2004.

During a March 24, 2009, public meeting, the NRC announced that it cleared the Confirmatory Action Letter (CAL), and has returned Palo Verde to Column 1 on the NRC Action Matrix. The commission's letter stated that "The U.S. Nuclear Regulatory Commission has determined that the Palo Verde Nuclear Generating Station has made sufficient performance improvement that it can reduce its level of inspection oversight." "Performance at Palo Verde has improved substantially and we are adjusting our oversight accordingly," said Elmo E. Collins, NRC's Region IV Administrator. "But we will closely monitor the plant. We are reducing our oversight, but not our vigilance."

To address safety concerns, 58 nuclear sirens were installed within a 10-mile radius of the plant. This area is designated as the EPZ (Emergency Planning Zone). The sirens will wail periodically in the event of any nuclear emergency.

== History ==
The selection of the site for Palo Verde was controversial. Critics claim that the site was not the first choice because it was in the middle of the desert, it had little or no water supply, and it had prevailing westerly winds. These would have put the Phoenix-Mesa metropolitan area into jeopardy in the event of a major accident. Critics claimed that the site was selected over alternatives because it was owned by a relative of Keith Turley, a person who received almost two million dollars for the land. Keith Turley was the president of APS, and also a member of the "Phoenix 40".

Units 1 and 2 went into commercial operation in 1986 and Unit 3 in 1988.

On November 18, 2005, the U.S. Nuclear Regulatory Commission announced approval of power up-rates at two of Palo Verde's reactors. According to the NRC press release, "The power up-rates at each unit, located near Phoenix, Arizona, increases the net generating capacity of the reactors from 1,270 to 1,313, and 1,317 megawatts of electric power respectively, for Units 1 and 3.

On April 21, 2011, the NRC renewed the operating licenses for Palo Verde's three reactors, extending their service lives from forty to sixty years.

== Seismic risk ==
The Nuclear Regulatory Commission's estimate of the risk each year of an earthquake intense enough to cause core damage to the reactor at Palo Verde was 1 in 26,316, ranking it #18 in the nation according to an NRC study published in August 2010.

== Surrounding population ==
The Nuclear Regulatory Commission defines two emergency planning zones around nuclear power plants: a plume exposure pathway zone with a radius of 10 miles (16 km), concerned primarily with exposure to, and inhalation of, airborne radioactive contamination, and an ingestion pathway zone of about 50 miles (80 km), concerned primarily with ingestion of food and liquid contaminated by radioactivity.

The 2010 U.S. population within 10 miles (16 km) of Palo Verde was 4,255, an increase of 132.9 percent in a decade, according to an analysis of U.S. Census data for msnbc.com. The 2010 U.S. population within 50 miles (80 km) was 1,999,858, an increase of 28.6 percent since 2000. Cities within 50 miles include Phoenix (47 miles (76 km) to city center).

== See also ==
- List of largest power stations in the United States
- Largest nuclear power plants in the United States
