= Huntington Beach Energy Project =

Natural gas-fired power station in California, US

- Official name: Huntington Beach Energy Project
- Country: United States
- Location: Huntington Beach, California
- Coordinates: 33°38′42″N 117°58′35″W
- Status: Operational
- Construction began: Units 1-4: 1958; Unit 5: June 2017
- Commission date: Units 1-4: 1967; Unit 5: February 4, 2020
- Decommission date: Units 1: December 31, 2019; Unit 2: December 31, 2020 (expected); Unit 3: ? Unit 4: ?
- Owner: AES Corporation
- Operator: AES Corporation

Thermal power station
- Primary fuel: Natural gas
- Cooling source: Unit 2: Pacific Ocean; Unit 5: Atmosphere
- Combined cycle?: Yes

Power generation
- Units operational: 1 x 225 MW CCGT; 1 x 644 MW CCGT
- Units planned: 1 x 200 MW SCGT
- Units decommissioned: 1 x 225 MW CCGT; 2 x ? MW
- Nameplate capacity: 869 MW

The Huntington Beach Energy Project (HBEP), formerly AES Huntington Beach, is a natural gas-fired power station located in Huntington Beach, California.

== History ==
The facility was constructed between 1958 and 1969 on a 53-acre site (21 ha). Total station capacity was 1,000,000 kilowatts. It originally consisted of two 215 MW General Electric cross compound 3600/1800 RPM steam turbines (HP/LP turbines). Main steam pressure was 2400 PSI, main steam temperature was 1050 DEG F and reheat temperature was 1000 °F. The generators were hydrogen cooled, rated at 128,000 KVA. The boilers were Babcock and Wilcox natural circulation (drum boilers), rated at 1,560,000 lb/hr. The boilers could be fired with natural gas or fuel oil. Units 1 and 2 were completed in 1958. Unit 3 was a General Electric cross compound 3600/1800 RPM at 1050/1000 °F, with a 215 MW steam turbine. Unit 4 was a Westinghouse, cross compound 3600/1800 rpm, 1050/1000 °F 225 MW. The boilers were Babcox and Wilcox Universal Pressure Boilers (called once thru) rated at 1,638,000 lb/hr. All four units were cooled using water sourced from the Pacific Ocean. Unit 5 was completed in 1969 and was a gas peaking unit, rated at 121 MW at 90 °F. It consisted of 8 Pratt & Whitney GG4a-2 gas turbines exhausting into 4 Worthington expanders 2 stage turbines and 1 Westinghouse generator, 3 phase hydrogen cooled rated at 162,500 KVA, 16,000 volts 3600 rpm. Unit 1 was decommissioned on December 31, 2019, while Units 3 and 4 were decommissioned at an unknown date. Unit 2 is the only original unit still in operation.

In June 2017, AES began construction of a 644 MW combined cycle gas turbine (Unit 5) that is visually smaller and is air-cooled. Unit 5 was commissioned on February 4, 2020. An additional 200 MW simple cycle gas turbine is proposed for the site should additional capacity be necessary.

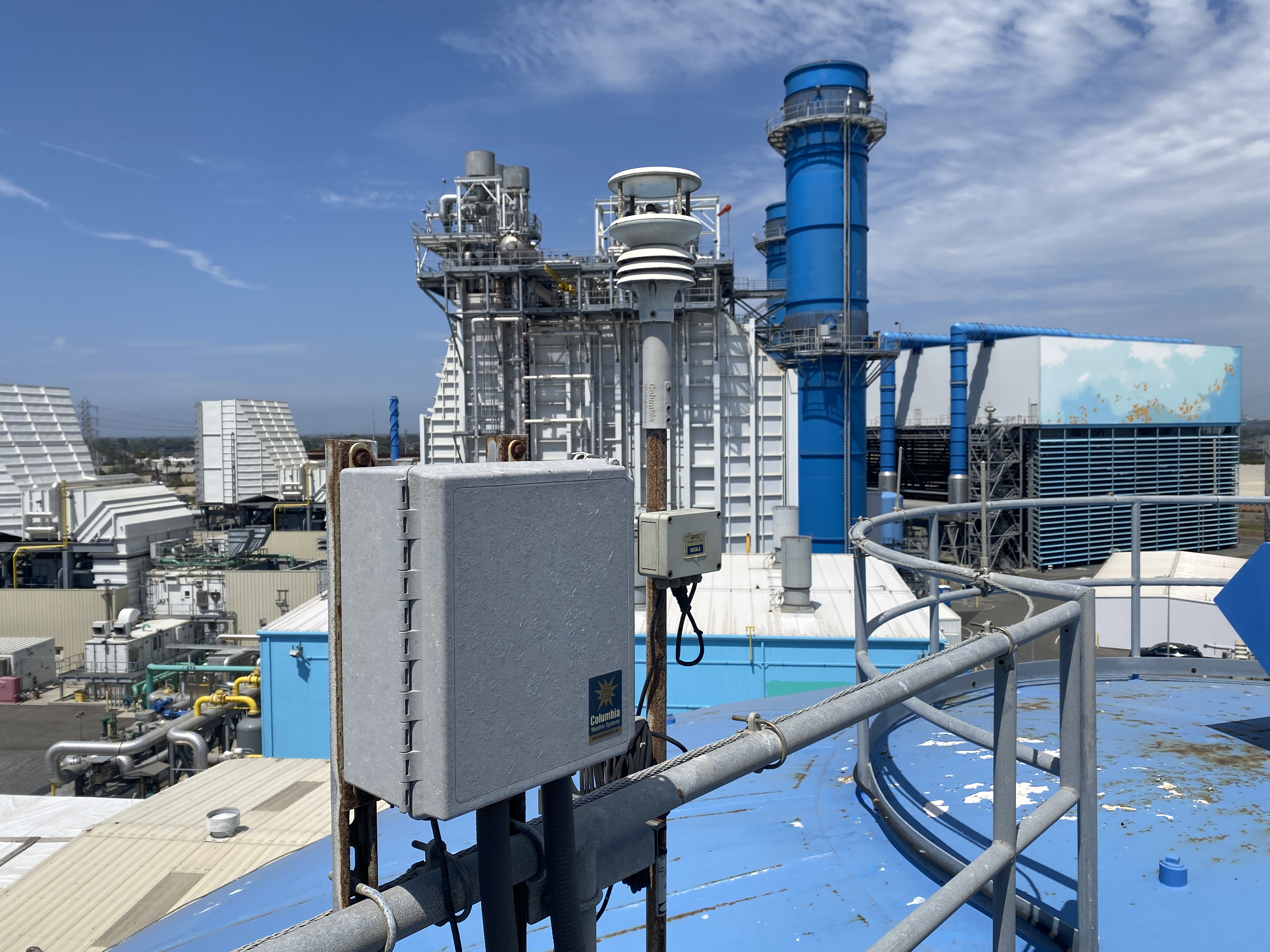
The HBEP is one of the cleanest power generation plants in California.

== See also ==
- List of power stations in California
