= Sunshine Canyon Landfill =

Landfill in Los Angeles County, California

Coordinates: 34.3281°N 118.5153°W

The Sunshine Canyon Landfill is situated on a 1,036-acre site (419 ha) in the Los Angeles neighborhood of Granada Hills, just south of Newhall Pass. The landfill was commissioned in 1958 and serves Los Angeles County.

== Description ==
Sunshine Canyon receives one-third of the daily waste, approximately 8,300 tons (7,530 metric tonnes), produced by of Los Angeles and the surrounding cities. The landfill is also home to a 23.5 MW biogas power station that was commissioned in 2013. The landfill has been the subject of complaints over the years concerning noxious odors, diesel truck traffic and dust. The site applied for an emergency waiver that would allow receiving debris from the January 2025 Southern California wildfires after state environmental regulators temporarily suspended certain rules under the disaster proclamation that was issued.

== See also ==
- Scholl Canyon Landfill
- List of power stations in California
