= Alamitos Energy Center =

Natural gas-fired power station in Long Beach, California

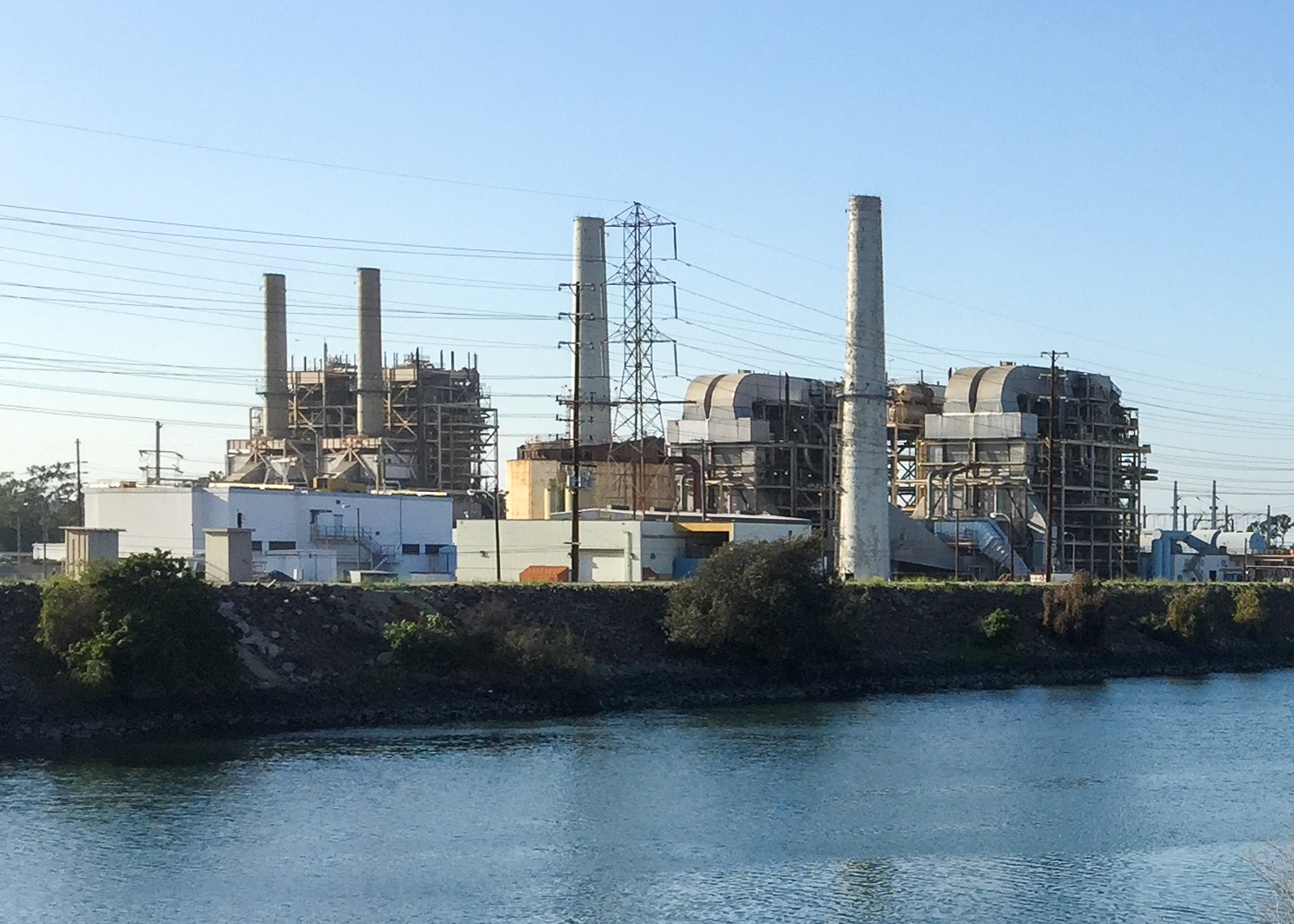
- Units 1-4 as seen from San Gabriel River Bike Trail in March 2017.
- Official name: Alamitos Energy Center
- Country: United States
- Location: Long Beach, California
- Coordinates: 33°46′09″N 118°06′07″W
- Status: Operational
- Construction began: Units 1-6: Late 1950s Block 1: July 2017; Block 2: Late 2020 (planned); BESS: June 2019
- Commission date: Units 1-6: Late 1950s Block 1: February 7, 2020
- Decommission date: Units 1, 2, 6: December 31, 2019; Units 3-5: December 31, 2026 (planned)
- Construction cost: $ 400 Million (Modernization)
- Owner: AES Corporation
- Operator: AES Corporation

Thermal power station
- Primary fuel: Natural gas
- Cooling source: Units 3-5: Seawater; Block 1: Atmosphere
- Combined cycle?: Units 3-5: No; Block 1: Yes; Block 2: No

Power generation
- Units operational: 2 x 320 MW; 1 x 480 MW; 1 x 640 MW
- Units planned: 1 x 400 MW
- Units decommissioned: 2 x 175 MW; 1 x 480; 1 x ? MW
- Nameplate capacity: 1,760 MW
- Annual net output: 958 GWh (2018)
- Storage capacity: 400 MWh (Early 2021)

The Alamitos Energy Center (AEC), formerly AES Alamitos, is a natural gas-fired power station located in Long Beach, California. It is built on the site of the Alamitos Generating Station (AGS), which is undergoing decommissioning.

== Description ==
Alamitos Generating Station was originally built in the 1950s by Southern California Edison and consisted of seven natural gas-fired generating units that were cooled using a seawater once-through cooling system. Units 1 and 2 generated 175 MW each, units 3 and 4 generated 320 MW each, and units 5 and 6 generate 480 MW each. Unit 7 generated an unknown amount of electricity and was decommissioned at an unknown date. The AES Corporation purchased the power station from Southern California Edison in 1998.

=== Modernization ===
Partially to comply with California's Once-Through Cooling Policy passed in 2010, AES submitted an application on December 27, 2013 to the California Energy Commission to modernize the existing power station with a new 1,936 MW facility on the site. On October 26, 2015, the project was revised down to 1,040 MW consisting of Block 1, a two turbine 640 MW combined cycle gas generator and Block 2, four simple cycle gas turbines totaling 400 MW, both of which use air-cooled condensers for cooling.

Block 1 was constructed between July 2019 and January 2020, and was commissioned on February 7, 2020. Block 2 was planned to be constructed between late 2020 and mid 2022, but is on indefinite hold. As part of the modernization project, all six operating units and the retired Unit 7 of the AGS were planned to be demolished.

==== Battery Storage Project ====
Alamitos Battery Energy Storage System (BESS) was proposed in 2012 under Southern California Edison's call for peaking capacity. The 100 MW system with a capacity of 400 megawatt-hours was notable as the first battery system that competed with gas-fired peaker plants. Construction of the battery energy storage system (BESS) began in June 2019, and was complete in early 2021.

==== Decommissioning Units 1-6 ====
Units 1, 2, and 6 were decommissioned on December 31, 2019. Units 3-5 have a retirement date of December 31, 2020. However, in late 2019, AES submitted an application to the California Energy Commission to continue to operate units 3-5 for an additional 1 to 3 years. This was approved through 2023, and then extended until December 2026.

The water quality in the Alamitos Bay could be degraded by the decommissioning of the AGS pumps and switches to air-cooled generators. The City of Long Beach is assessing a replacement for these pumps to maintain the bay's water circulation.

== See also ==
- List of power stations in California
