= Stateline Solar =

Photovoltaic power station in California, United States

- Country: United States
- Location: San Bernardino County
- Coordinates: 35°35′08″N 115°26′09″W
- Status: Operational
- Commission date: September 2016
- Owners: Southern Company and First Solar
- Operator: First Solar

Solar farm
- Type: Flat-panel PV fixed tilt
- Site area: 1,685 acres (682 ha)

Power generation
- Nameplate capacity: 300 MW_{p}, ~250 MW_{AC}
- Capacity factor: 30.0% (average 2017-2019)
- Annual net output: 656 GW·h, 390 MW·h/acre

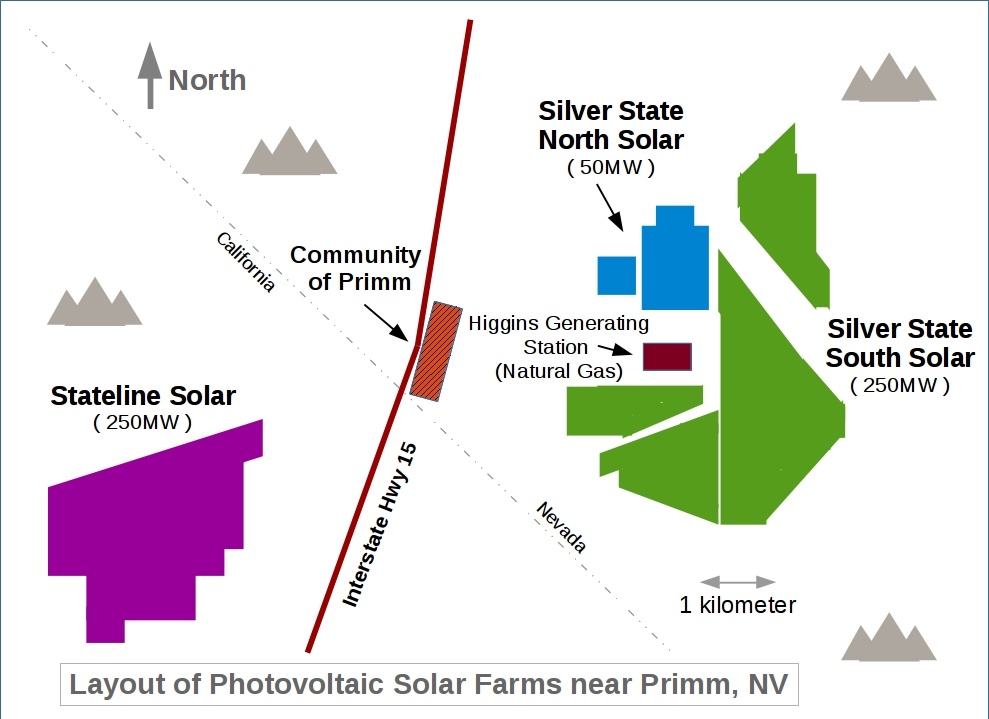
Layout of the project near Primm, NV

Desert Stateline Solar Facility is a 300 MW_{p} (about 250 MW_{AC}) utility-scale solar photovoltaic power station constructed by First Solar in San Bernardino County in California, USA. It is located at the base of Clark Mountain in California, across the state line from Primm, Nevada, and adjacent to the Ivanpah Solar Power Facility.

The project uses approximately 3.2 million panels from First Solar, an amount similar to the 250 MW_{AC} Moapa Southern Paiute Solar Project.

The plant's first 150 megawatts (MW) came online in late 2015, and it entered full commercial operation in the third quarter of 2016. In September 2015, it was announced that Southern Company had purchased a controlling interest in the project. First Solar continues to operate the facility. Power is sold to Southern California Edison under a 20-year power purchase agreement.

== Electricity production ==
Generation (MW·h) of Stateline Solar
Year	Jan	Feb	Mar	Apr	May	Jun	Jul	Aug	Sep	Oct	Nov	Dec	Total
2015												10,000	10,000
2016	17,099	27,608	39,592	43,113	51,623	53,072	60,006	60,235	59,467	54,253	47,456	34,280	547,804
2017	26,089	29,141	54,474	58,124	74,122	80,287	73,112	67,639	63,029	58,068	35,893	37,764	657,742
2018	30,981	43,611	49,866	62,339	75,142	80,961	69,980	70,467	66,707	52,557	36,151	28,760	667,522
2019	29,646	34,592	52,546	61,114	63,630	76,924	75,915	74,349	60,802	55,867	35,729	23,029	644,143
Average Annual Production (years 2017–2019) --->													656,469

== See also ==
- Silver State South Solar Project
- List of photovoltaic power stations
