= Los Esteros Critical Energy Facility =

Powerplant in San Jose, California

The Los Esteros Critical Energy Facility is a power plant in San Jose, California, operated by Calpine. Located near the San Jose-Milpitas border, it began operations in 2003 with an initial capacity of 188 megawatts. In 2013 it was upgraded to 309 megawatts. The facility uses four natural gas turbines run as a combined-cycle facility where the exhaust from the gas turbine is used to create steam that drives a steam generator.

== See also ==
- List of power stations in California
