= Scattergood Generating Station =

Power station in Los Angeles

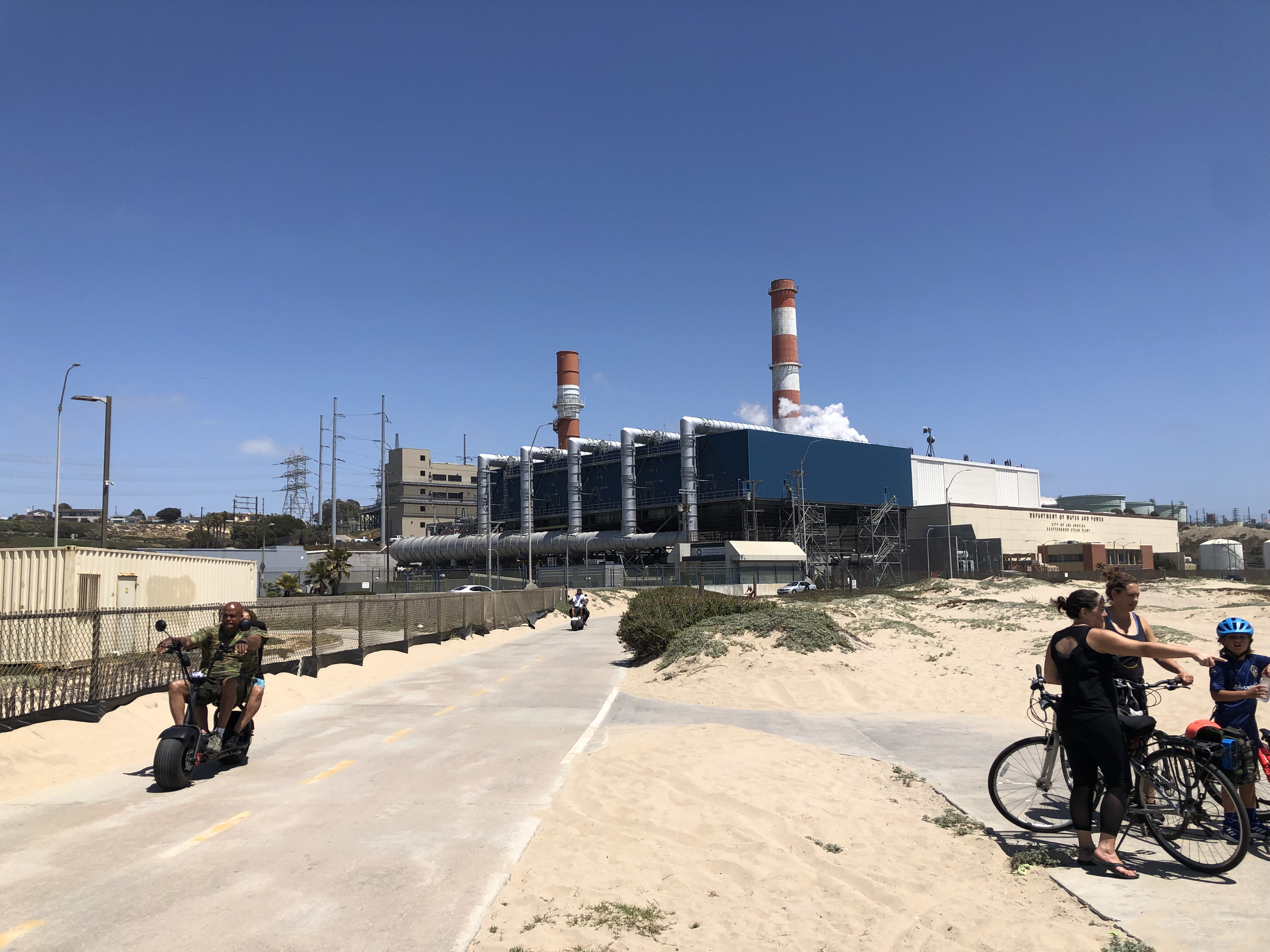
- View of Scattergood steam plant from Marvin Braude Bike Path
- Country: Los Angeles
- Location: Los Angeles, California
- Coordinates: 33°55′07″N 118°25′40″W
- Status: Active, refit planned
- Construction began: 1957
- Commission date: 7 December 1958
- Owner: Los Angeles Department of Water and Power
- Operator: Los Angeles Department of Water and Power

Power generation
- Units operational: 2 x 197 MW, 1 x 445 MW
- Nameplate capacity: 830 MW
- Capacity factor: 23.9% (2005)
- Annual net output: 118,402 MWh

Scattergood Generating Station is an electricity-generating facility in the Playa Del Rey area of Los Angeles, California, in proximity to El Segundo and LAX. Scattergood has an 830 MW capacity spread across three steam turbine units. Owned and operated by the Los Angeles Department of Water and Power (LADWP), the station is a coastal landmark of the Santa Monica Bay in southern California. Plans are in place to convert the station to hydrogen power.

== History ==
Construction on the 56-acre (230,000 m^{2}) site began in the late 1950s. The power plant, which cost $65 million, was named for Ezra F. Scattergood, first chief electric engineer of the Los Angeles municipal power system. Units 1 and 2 were brought online in 1958 and 1959, respectively; Unit 3 came online in 1974 with a potential 460 MW output.

In February 2023, the LA city council unanimously approved an $800 million plan to convert the plant from natural gas to hydrogen. The refitted plant will provide base load during periods of high demand or emergencies as part of city plans to run on 100% renewable energy by 2035.

== Description ==
Circa 1964, the entire plant could be operated with as few as six staffers. As of 1971, Unit 3 was projected to cost an additional $68 million but provide power for 10 percent of the city. Between 2013 and 2015, the Department of Water and Power replaced the original Unit 3 “with a highly efficient combined cycle (natural gas and steam) turbine and two simple-cycle turbines.”

The plant is currently powered by gas supplied by Southern California Gas. Waste gas from the neighboring Hyperion sewage treatment plant was used during the 1960s. The plant cycles through 500,000,000 U.S. gal (1.9×10^{9} L) of seawater daily as coolant. The seawater cools the freshwater that is turned to steam and back again; the steam turns the turbines that generate the electricity. The seawater is released back into the ocean 20 °F (11 °C) warmer than when it was removed.

The plant’s electricity production was considered “extremely stable” circa 1977. Output is transmitted through an intertie line.

One writer described Scattergood and similar plants as “steel T. Rexes” hovering over southern California’s “finest beaches.” Another local journalist wrote that the presence of the “large, noisy” generating station discouraged tourism at adjacent beaches.

== The facility in media ==
In 1990, the facility served as a filming location for heavy metal band Judas Priest's "Painkiller" music video and was directed by Wayne Isham.
