= Imperial Solar Energy Center West =

Photovoltaic power plant built in Imperial County,

Tenaska Imperial Solar Energy Center West
- Country: United States
- Location: California
- Coordinates: 32.775°N 115.785°W
- Status: Operational
- Construction began: 2014
- Commission date: September 2016
- Owner: Tenaska

Solar farm
- Type: Flat-panel PV
- Site area: 1,100 acres (4.5 km^{2})

Power generation
- Nameplate capacity: 150 MW

The Tenaska Imperial Solar Energy Center West is a 150 megawatt (MW) photovoltaic power plant built in Imperial County, California. Construction began in 2014 and full commercial operation was achieved in September 2016. Power is sold to San Diego Gas & Electric on a 25-year agreement.

The project utilizes 1.8 million thin-film photovoltaic modules made of CdTe, designed and manufactured by First Solar and covers an area of 1,100 acres (450 ha). The plant is owned by CSOLAR IV South, LLC, an affiliate of Tenaska.

== Electricity production ==
Generation (MW·h) of Imperial Solar Energy Center West
Year	Jan	Feb	Mar	Apr	May	Jun	Jul	Aug	Sep	Oct	Nov	Dec	Total
2016				34,467	46,219	43,630	46,414	41,717	34,884	29,146	21,477	17,301	315,255
2017													
Total													315,255

== See also ==
- Solar power in California
- List of photovoltaic power stations
