= Imperial Solar Energy Center South =

Photovoltaic power station in Imperial County, California

Tenaska Imperial Solar Energy Center South
- Country: United States
- Location: California
- Coordinates: 32.66°N 115.66°W
- Status: Operational
- Construction began: 2011
- Commission date: November 2013
- Owner: Tenaska

Solar farm
- Type: Flat-panel PV
- Site area: 946 acres (3.8 km^{2})

Power generation
- Nameplate capacity: 130 MW
- Annual net output: 323 GW·h

External links
- Website: www.tenaskaimperialsolar.com

The Tenaska Imperial Solar Energy Center South is a 130 megawatt (MW) photovoltaic power plant built in Imperial County, California. Construction began in December 2011 and full commercial operation was achieved in November 2013. Power is sold to San Diego Gas & Electric on a 25-year agreement.

The project utilizes nearly 2 million thin-film photovoltaic modules made of CdTe, designed and manufactured by First Solar and covers an area of 946 acres (383 ha). The plant is owned by CSOLAR IV South, LLC, an affiliate of Tenaska.

== Electricity production ==
Generation (MW·h) of Imperial Solar Energy Center South
Year	Jan	Feb	Mar	Apr	May	Jun	Jul	Aug	Sep	Oct	Nov	Dec	Total
2013				1,420	6,546	11,488	12,660	24,038	29,134	24,615	23,055	22,735	155,691
2014	22,912	20,866	29,855	30,342	31,882	30,832	29,193	29,335	28,673	26,971	24,893	18,034	323,788
2015	20,833	24,470	29,355	30,363	31,038	27,761	29,194	29,685	25,274	26,044	24,561	21,163	319,741
2016	20,671	24,014	25,343	27,175	30,357	27,626	28,812	28,913	26,483	21,722	18,008	14,732	293,856
Total													1,093,076

== See also ==
- Solar power in California
- List of photovoltaic power stations
