= Southern California Public Power Authority =

Joint powers authority in California, US

The Southern California Public Power Authority (SCPPA) is a joint powers authority, or a collective of 10 municipal utilities and one irrigation district in Southern California, United States.

== Description ==
SCPPA was created in 1980 to help finance the acquisition of generation and transmission resources for its members. The SCPPA is composed of the municipal utilities of the cities of Anaheim, Azusa, Banning, Burbank, Cerritos, Colton, Glendale, Los Angeles, Pasadena, Riverside and Vernon, and the Imperial Irrigation District (Member Agencies). In 2016, SCPPA was the 14th largest public power system in the United States by net generation.

== See also ==
- List of United States electric companies
