= Capital Dynamics (global asset manager) =

- Type: Private
- Industry: Private equity
- Founded: 1988
- Founder: Thomas Kubr
- Headquarters: Zug, Switzerland
- Key people: Martin Hahn (CEO); Hina Ahmad (COO)
- Products: Direct investments
- AUM: US$13 billion
- Number of employees: approximately 160 globally

Capital Dynamics is a global asset management firm focusing on private assets. The firm was created in 1988. As of Q4 2021, Capital Dynamics oversees more than US$13 billion in assets under management and advisement and employs approximately 160 workers globally across 14 offices.

As of September 30, 2021, assets under management are calculated based on the total commitments as of the final closing date for all funds currently managed by Capital Dynamics, including amounts that have been distributed.

Capital Dynamics had invested more than US$280 million in 40 solar PV projects in the United States.
