= Tenaska =

Energy company based in the United States

- Type: Employee Owned
- Industry: Energy
- Founded: April 1, 1987
- Founders: Howard Hawks; Tom Hendricks
- Headquarters: Omaha, Nebraska
- Area served: North America
- Key people: Chris Leitner, president and CEO; Drew Fossum, Senior VP; Greg Van Dyke, CFO
- Services: Energy development, power generation, natural gas marketing, power marketing, energy management services
- Revenue: $10.2 billion (2024)
- Number of employees: 842 (2025)
- Website: tenaska.com

Tenaska is a private, independent energy company based in the United States. The employee-owned company was founded in 1987 and is headquartered in Omaha, Nebraska, with regional offices in Dallas, Denver, Philadelphia, Boston, Houston, and Calgary and Vancouver in Canada. The company employs over 800 people.

Tenaska is a leading energy company with business operations that span the energy value chain. Tenaska Marketing Ventures (TMV) and Tenaska Power Services Co. (TPS) are among the largest natural gas and electric power marketing companies in North America. The company has an operating fleet of 6,622 megawatts (MW) of natural gas and renewable generating facilities and has developed, managed and/or operated more than 23,000 MW of natural gas-fueled and renewable generation. Tenaska is advancing more than 33,000 MW of energy projects, encompassing natural gas, natural gas with carbon capture and renewables.

Forbes magazine consistently ranks Tenaska among the largest private U.S. companies.

== History ==
In 1987, energy executives Howard Hawks, Tom Hendricks, Max Williams, and Gary Hoover launched Tenaska as a private company in the evolving energy industry. Their goal was to build one or two power plants; the company has now built a total of 17.

The company later established affiliates to focus on multiple aspects of the energy industry. Tenaska Marketing Ventures (TMV) manages, trades or sells approximately 10 percent of the total natural gas consumption of the United States and Canada. Similarly, Tenaska Power Services Co. (TPS), an affiliate to market power and provide ancillary services, is the leading provider of energy management services to generation and demand-side customers in the U.S. In 2023, Kraken Technologies signed a deal with TPS to manage customer battery sites in Texas.

== Scope of Business ==
Natural gas marketing: Tenaska Marketing Ventures provides services that include fuel supply, market and logistical services, asset management and financial and physical hedging services.

Power marketing: Tenaska Power Services Co. provides energy management services to generation and demand-side customers in the U.S. TPS offers optimization, risk management, power trading and settlement services.

Development: The Tenaska Development portfolio currently includes carbon capture and sequestration, natural gas-fired generation, renewable fuel peakers, wind, solar, energy storage and green hydrogen projects.

Generation: Encompassing natural gas, wind and solar, the Tenaska Generation fleet consists of 6,622 megawatts of generation combined.
