= List of geothermal power stations =

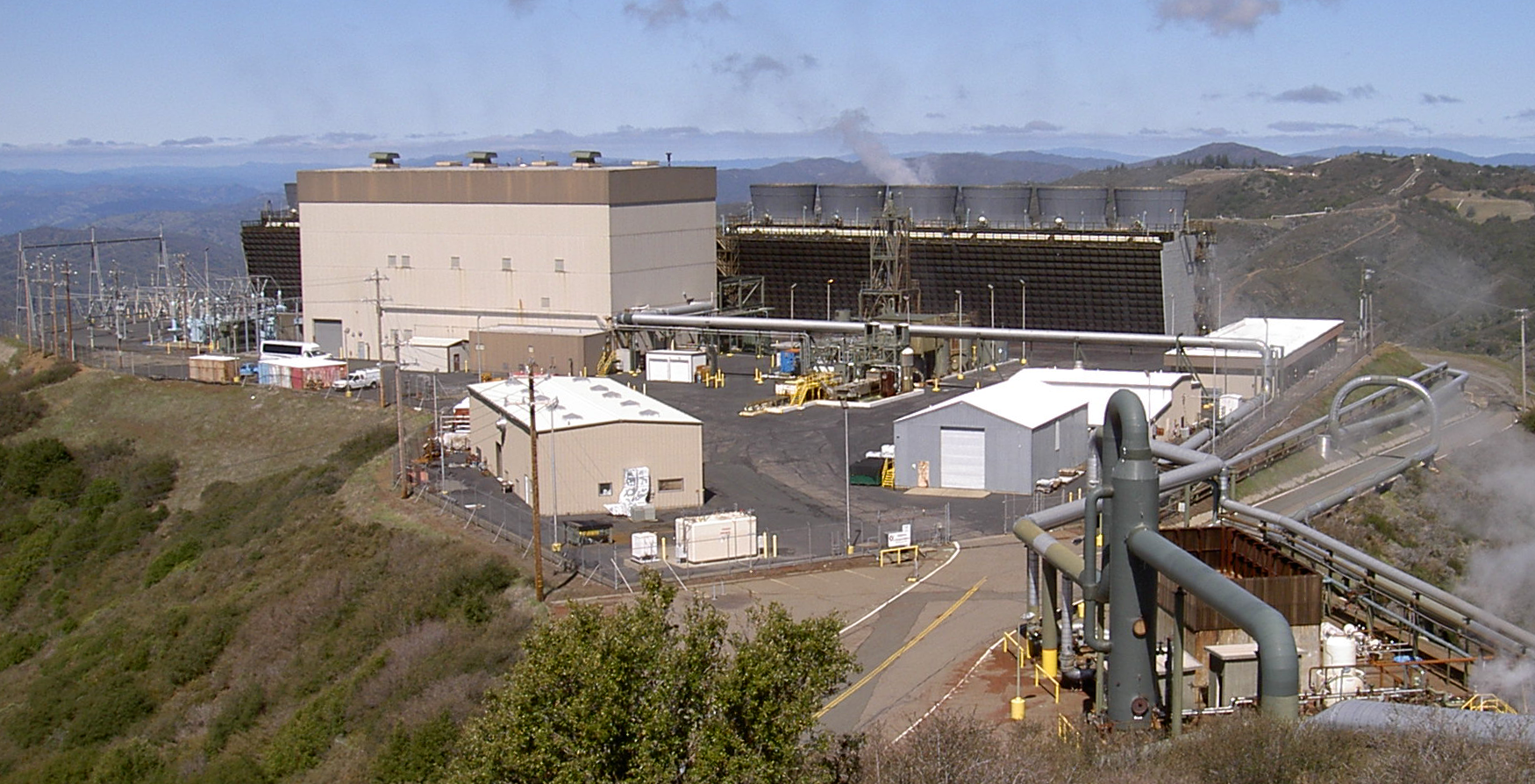
The Sonoma Calpine 3 power plant is one of 22 power plants at The Geysers in the United States.

This is a list of operational geothermal power stations with a current installed capacity of at least 10 MW.

The Geysers in California, United States is the largest geothermal power station in the world, with a nameplate capacity of 1,590 MW and an annual generation of 6,516 GWh in 2018.

== Geothermal power stations ==
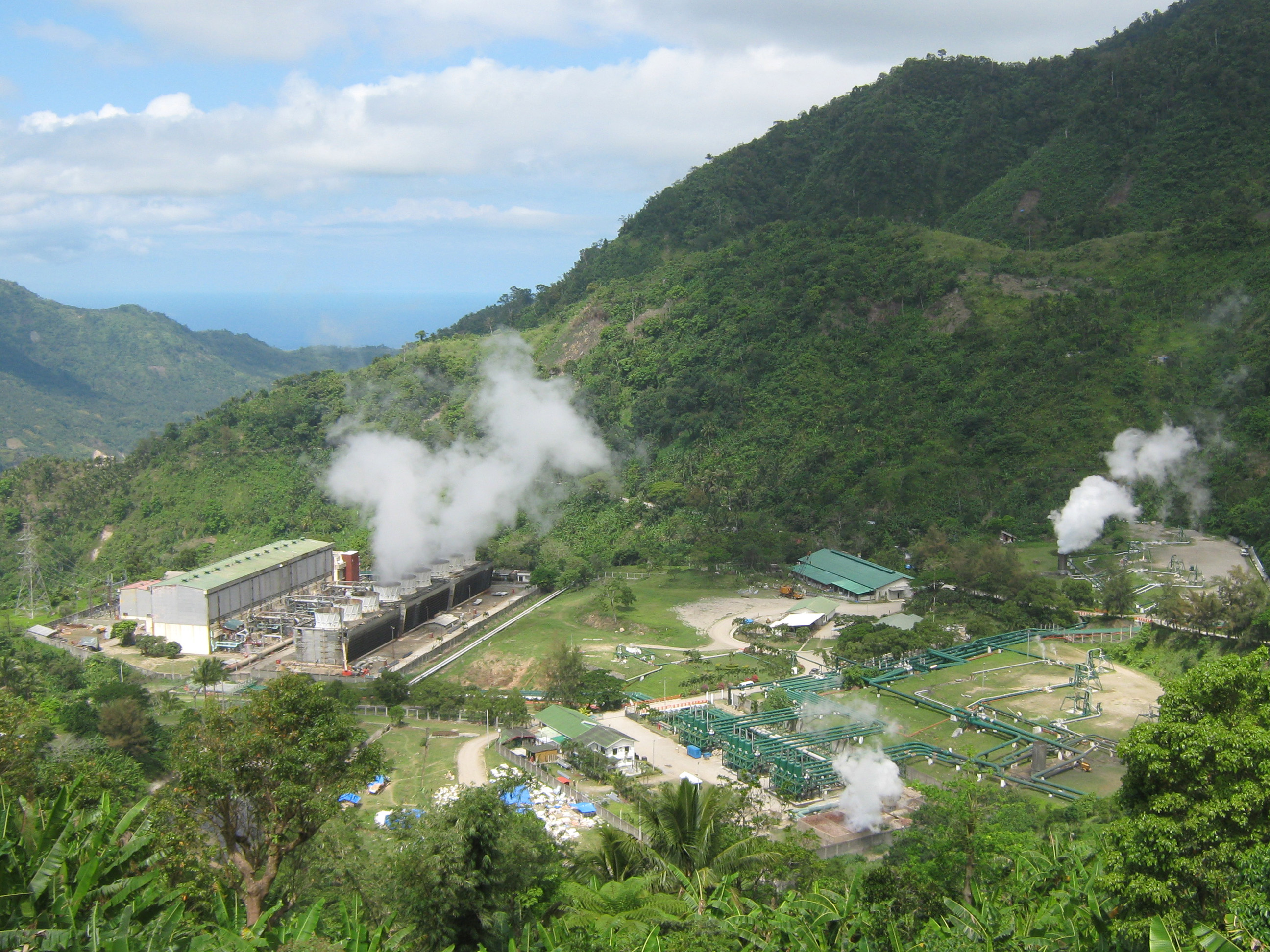
Palinpinon Geothermal Power Plant in Negros Oriental, Philippines

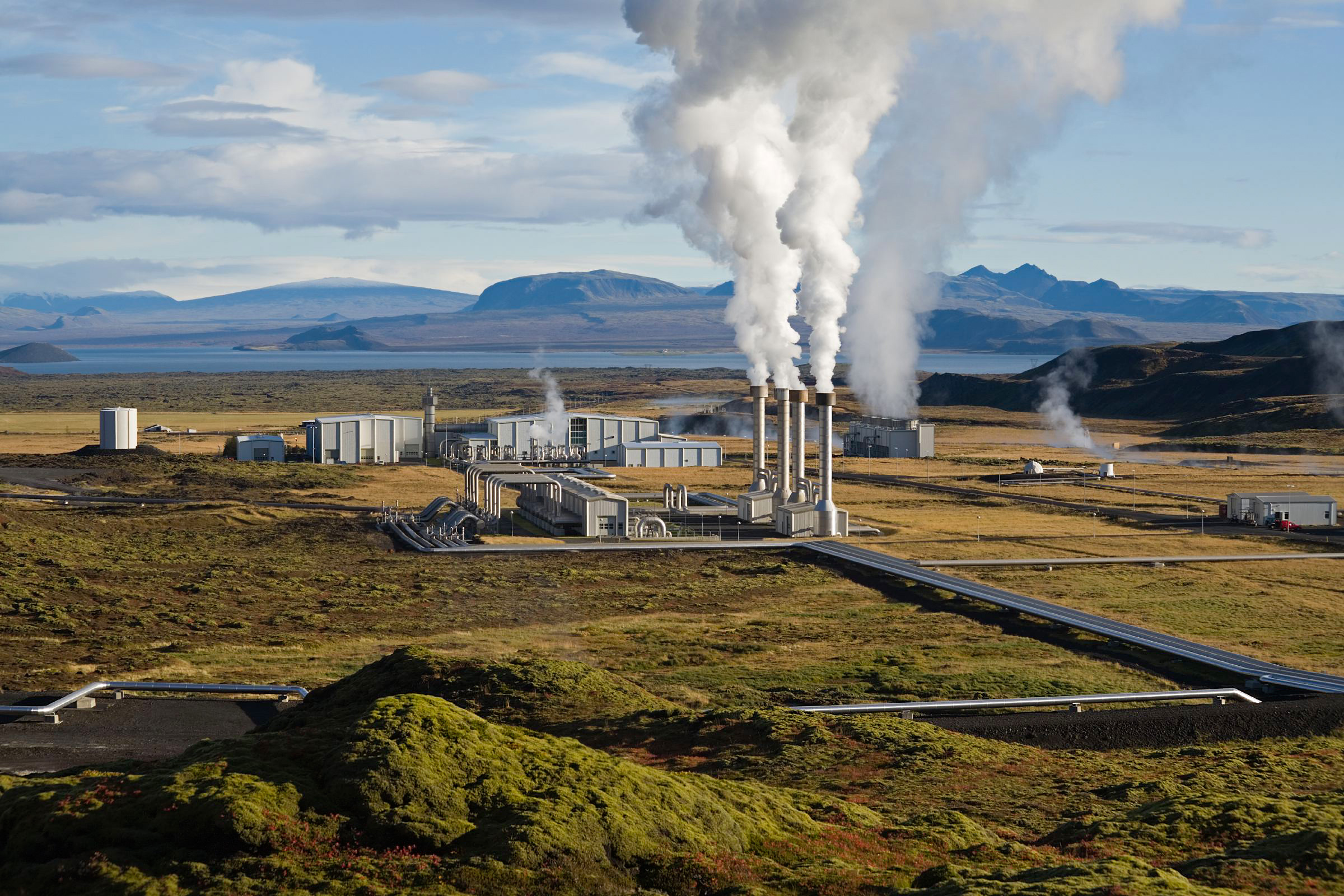
Nesjavellir Power Station in Iceland

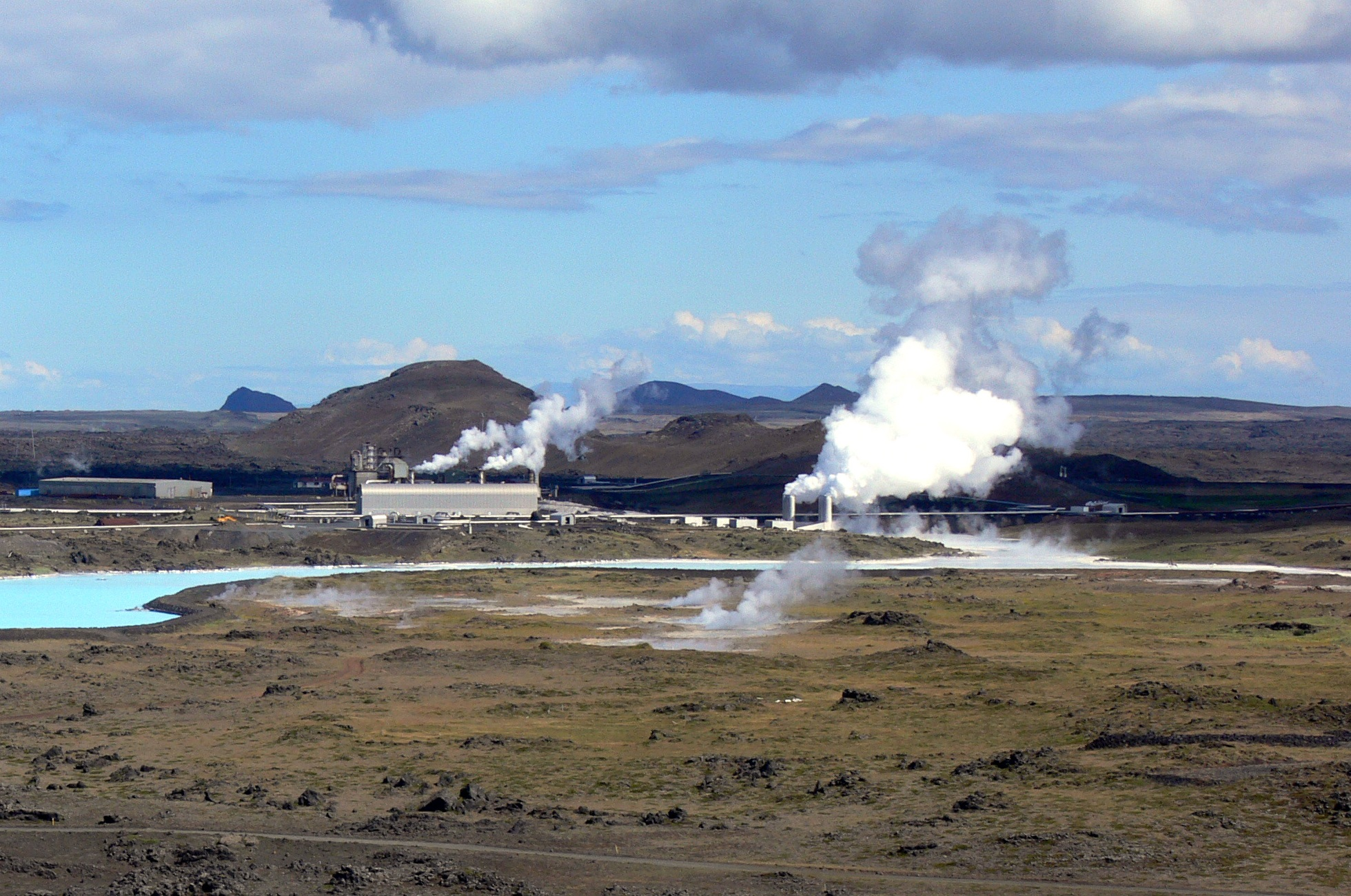
Reykjanes Power Station in Iceland

Name	Country	Location	Capacity (MW_{el})	Stations	Type	Ref
Ahuachapán	El Salvador	13°55′13″N 89°49′03″W	95	1		
Bacman	Philippines	13°03′36″N 123°55′45″E	209.8	3		
Beowawe	United States	40°33′17″N 116°37′03″W	19.2		Flash steam (87%); Binary cycle (13%)	
Berlín	El Salvador	13°31′29″N 88°30′31″W	115.4	1		
Blue Mountain	United States	40°59′42″N 118°08′35″W	50	1	Binary cycle	
Blundell	United States	38°29′21″N 112°51′11″W	36	2	Flash steam (70%); Binary cycle (30%)	
Brady	United States	39°47′46″N 119°00′36″W	26			
Cerro Prieto	Mexico	32°24′43″N 115°14′41″W	570	9	Dry steam	
Coso	United States	36°01′00″N 117°47′51″W	270	4	Flash steam	
Cove Fort	United States	38°33′42″N 112°34′48″W	27			
Darajat	Indonesia	07°13′3″S 107°44′22″E	270	3	Dry steam	
Desert Peak	United States	39°45′14″N 118°57′13″W	92	2	Flash steam (71.7%); Binary cycle (28.3%)	
Dixie Valley	United States	39°57′59″N 117°51′21″W	61	2	Flash steam (99%); Binary cycle (1%)	
Don A. Campbell	United States	38°50′10″N 118°19′27″W	39			
Efeler	Turkey	37°51′35″N 27°36′56″E	162.3 (Note: ~~Currently~~ As of "August 16, 2019, undergoing expansion to 259.9 MW by 2022.)			
The Geysers	United States	38°47′26″N 122°45′21″W	1,590	22	Dry steam	
Hatchōbaru	Japan	33°06′23″N 131°11′16″E	112	1	Flash steam (98.2%); Binary cycle (1.8%)	
Heber	United States	32°42′52″N 115°31′37″W	81	2	Binary cycle	
Hellisheiði	Iceland	64°02′14″N 21°24′03″W	303	1	Flash steam	
Imperial Valley	United States	33°09′48″N 115°37′00″W	403.4	11	Dry steam	
Jersey Valley	United States	40°10′52″N 117°28′33″W	10			
Kamojang I, II, III, IV, V	Indonesia	7°07′30″S 107°48′00″E	235	5	Flash steam Dry steam	
Karaha	Indonesia		30	1		
Kawerau	New Zealand	38°03′47″S 176°43′38″E	100	1	Flash steam	
Kızıldere	Turkey	37°57′00″N 28°50′35″E	80	1		
Krafla	Iceland	65°42′14″N 16°46′23″W	60	1	Flash steam	
Larderello	Italy	43°13′56″N 10°53′07″E	769	34		
Lihir	Papua New Guinea	3°07′28″S 152°38′47″E	55			
Los humeros	Mexico		25			
Mak–Ban	Philippines	14°5′28″N 121°13′7″E	458			
Mahanagdong	Philippines	11°06′55″N 124°40′22″E	180			
Malitbog	Philippines	11°09′07″N 124°38′58″E	233	1		
Mammoth	United States	37°38′44″N 118°54′42″W	60	4	Binary cycle	
McGinness Hills	United States	39°35′21″N 116°54′42″W	138	3	Binary cycle	
Mindanao	Philippines	7°00′47″N 125°13′12″E	106	2		
Miravalles	Costa Rica	10°42′02″N 85°11′40″W	100			
Mokai	New Zealand	38°31′49″S 175°55′35″E	132	2		
Muara Laboh	Indonesia	1°14′S 101°25′E	85	1	Flash steam	
Gunung Salak	Indonesia	6°43′S 106°44′E	377	6	Flash steam	
Mutnovskaya	Russia	52°32′19″N 158°12′06″E	50	1	Flash steam	
Neal Hot Springs	United States	44°01′23″N 117°28′04″W	22			
Nesjavellir	Iceland	64°06′29″N 21°15′23″W	120	1		
Nga Awa Purua	New Zealand	38°36′43″S 176°11′35″E	132	1	Flash steam	
Ngatamariki	New Zealand	38°32′50″S 176°11′45″E	82	1	Binary cycle	
North Brawley	United States	33°00′52″N 115°32′27″W	13	1	Binary cycle	
North Valley	United States		25	1	Binary cycle	
Olkaria I, II, III, IV, V	Kenya	0°53′14″S 36°18′25″E	727	5		
Ohaaki	New Zealand	38°31′37″S 176°17′31″E	104	1		
Ormesa	United States	32°46′59″N 115°15′15″W	73.2		Binary cycle	
Palinpinon	Philippines	9°17′41″N 123°10′21″E	192.5	2		
Pamukören	Turkey	37°55′00″N 28°31′49″E	68			
Patua (Note: Patua consists of one 60 MW geothermal power plant and one 10 MW solar farm.)	United States	39°34′58″N 119°04′29″W	70	2	Binary cycle (85.7%); Solar PV (14.3%)	
Pauzhetskaya	Russia	51°27′55″N 156°48′42″E	14.5	1	Flash steam	
Poihipi	New Zealand	38°37′49″S 176°02′30″E	55	1		
Puna (Note: The Puna Complex is currently being expanded from 38 MW to 46 MW and is expected by the end of 2027.)	United States	19°28′43″N 154°53′20″W	38	2	Binary cycle	
Raft River	United States	42°05′58″N 113°22′57″W	11		Binary cycle	
Reykjanes	Iceland	63°49′35″N 22°40′55″W	130	1	Flash steam	
Salt Wells	United States	39°17′40″N 118°34′21″W	13.4		Binary cycle	
San Emidio	United States	40°22′50″N 119°23′59″W	11			
San Jacinto Tizate	Nicaragua	12°23′38″N 86°32′30″W	74			
Sarulla	Indonesia	1°53′14″N 99°01′24″E	330	3	Flash steam	
Serrazzano	Italy	43°12′15″N 10°48′01″E	60			
Soda Lake	United States	39°33′22″N 118°50′53″W	37	1		
Star Peak	United States		22	1		
Steamboat	United States	39°23′40″N 119°44′51″W	73 (Note: Currently being expanded from 73 MW to 93 MW. Expansion is expected to be complete by the end of 2020.)	7	Binary cycle (80.3%); Flash steam (19.7%)	
Stillwater	United States	39°32′45″N 118°33′22″W	75	2 (Note: Stillwater consists of one 49 MW geothermal power plant and one 26 MW solar farm.)	Binary cycle (65.3%); Solar PV (34.7%)	
Svartsengi	Iceland	63°52′44″N 22°25′58″W	77	1	Flash steam Binary cycle	
Te Huka	New Zealand	38°40′1″S 176°7′5″E	23	1	Binary cycle	
Te Mihi	New Zealand	38°37′09″S 176°02′52″E	166	1		
Thermo 1	United States	38°09′39″N 113°11′42″W	13			
Tiwi	Philippines	13°27′57″N 123°38′58″E	234		Flash steam	
Tongonan 1	Philippines	11°09′41″N 124°38′14″E	113			
Tungsten Mountain	United States	39°40′04″N 117°41′35″W	27			
Tuscarora	United States	41°28′02″N 116°09′02″W	18			
Ulubelu	Indonesia	5°18′20.88″S 104°34′36.84″E	220	4	Flash steam	
Upper Mahiao	Philippines	11°10′23″N 124°37′47″E	125			
Valle Secolo	Italy	43°14′11″N 10°52′02″E	120			
Wairakei	New Zealand	38°37′37″S 176°06′19″E	352	4	Flash steam (99.92%); Binary cycle (0.08%)	
Wayang Windu	Indonesia	07°12′00″S 107°37′30″E	227	1	Flash steam	
Velika Ciglena	Croatia	45°51'31.8"N 16°57'38.1"E	17	1	Binary cycle	
Þeistareykir	Iceland	65°53′26″N 16°57′47″W	90	1	Flash steam	

== See also ==
- Geothermal power
- List of largest geothermal power stations in the world
