= List of geothermal power stations in the United States =

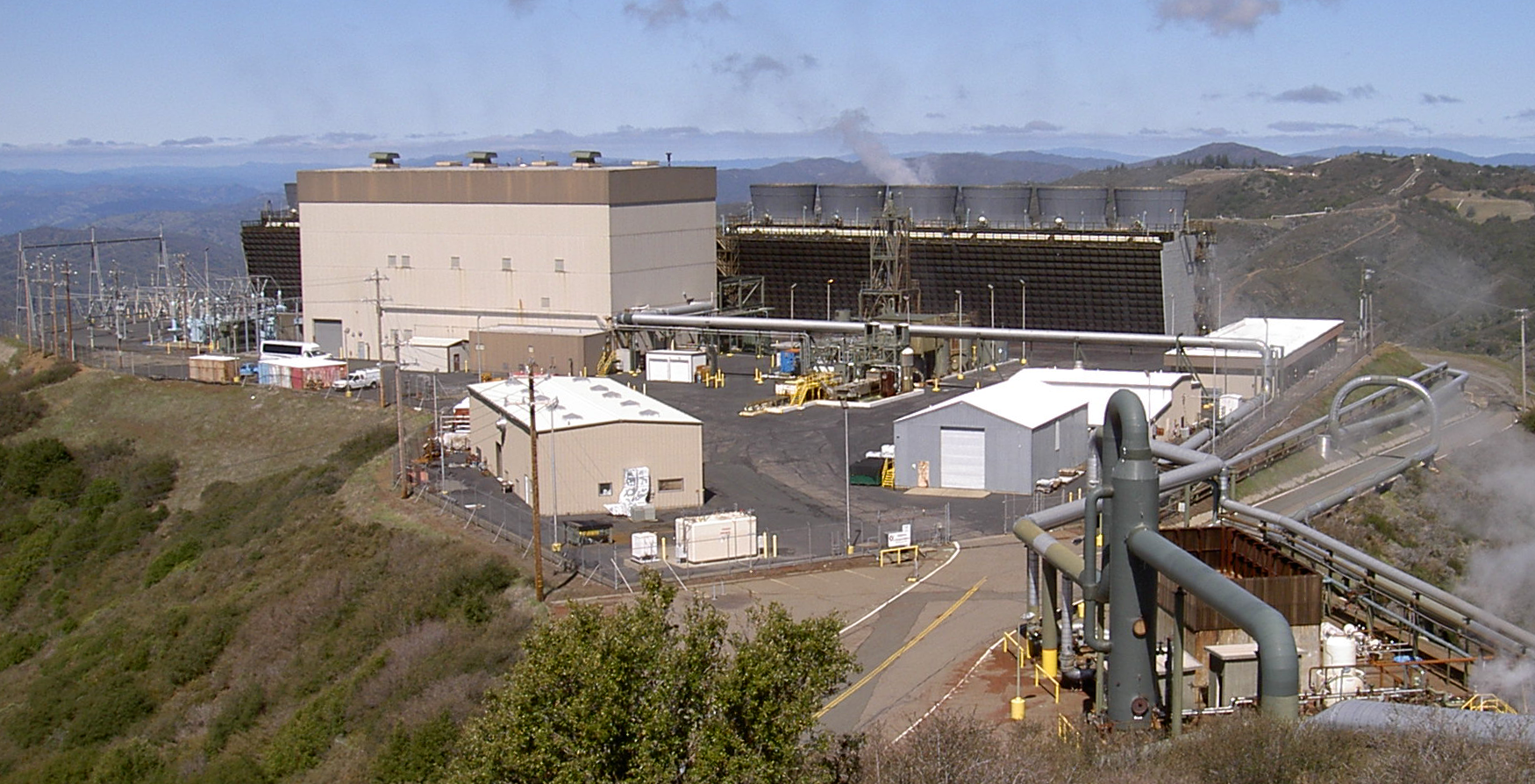
The Sonoma Calpine 3 geothermal power station of The Geysers in California

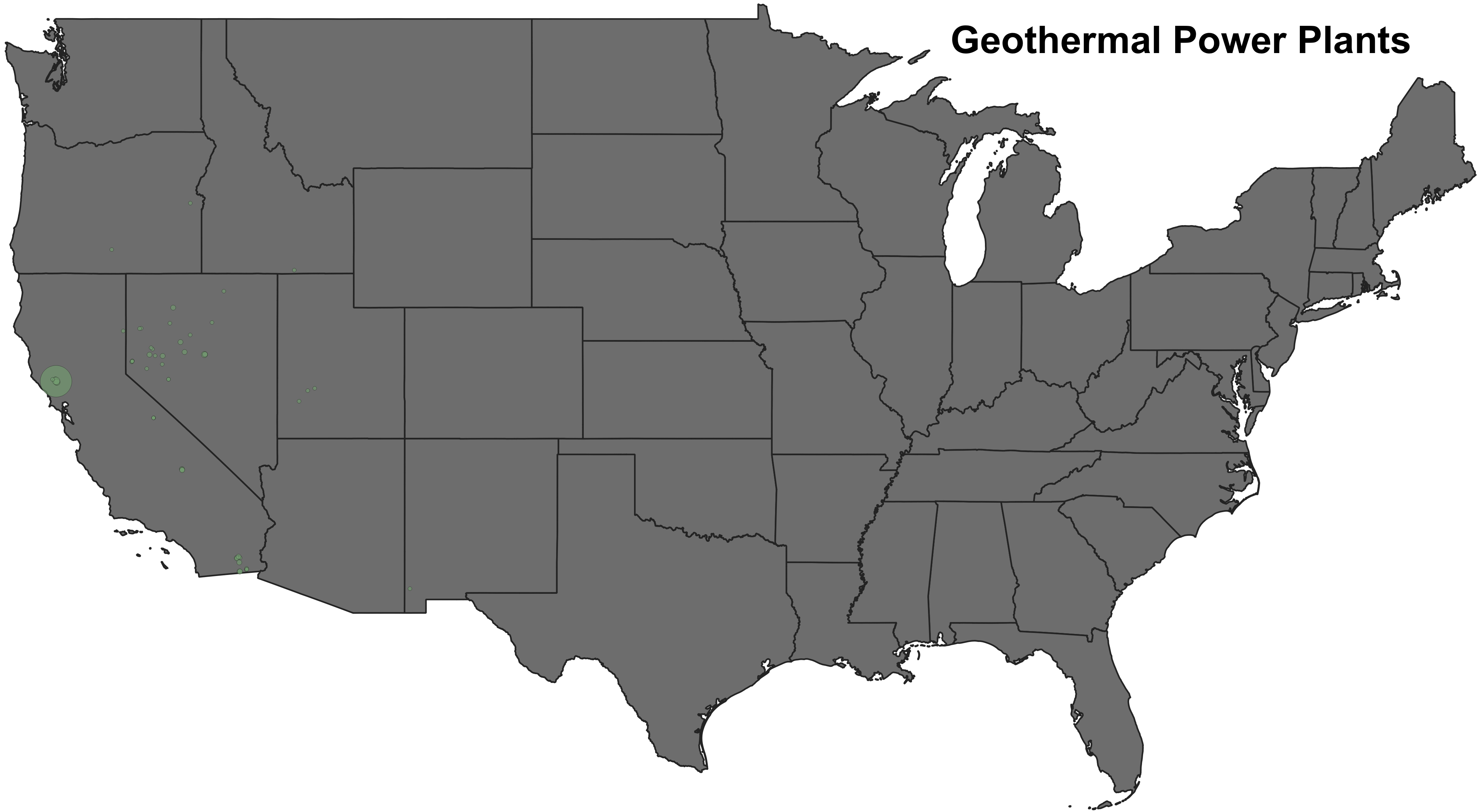
Geothermal power stations in the United States

Geothermal power stations in the United States are located exclusively within the Western United States where geothermal energy potential is highest. The highest concentrations are located in the Mayacamas Mountains and Imperial Valley of California, as well as in Western Nevada.

The first geothermal area to be exploited for commercial electricity generation was The Geysers, a complex of 22 geothermal power stations located in Sonoma and Lake counties of California, which was commissioned in September 1960. The complex was then developed into the largest geothermal field in the world, with a nameplate capacity of 1,517 MW and an annual generation of 6,516 GWh in 2018.

== Geothermal power plants/complexes ==
This is a list of all geothermal power plants/complexes currently in operation in the United States.

Name	State	Location	Capacity (MW)	Annual generation (GWh)	Owner	Type	Year	Ref
Beowawe	Nevada	40°33′17″N 116°37′03″W	19.2	99 (2018)	Terra-Gen Power	Flash steam (87%), binary cycle (13%)	1985	
Blue Mountain	Nevada	40°59′42″N 118°08′35″W	50	229 (2018)	Cyrq Energy	Binary cycle	2009	
Blundell	Utah	38°29′21″N 112°51′11″W	11	223 (2018)	PacifiCorp		2007	
Brady	Nevada	39°47′46″N 119°00′36″W	21.5	77 (2018)	Ormat		1992	
Casa Diablo IV	California	37°39′4″N 118°54′57″W	30		Ormat	Binary cycle	2022	
Coso	California	36°01′00″N 117°47′51″W	272.3	1,176 (2018)	Coso Operating Company	Flash steam	1987	
Cove Fort	Utah	38°33′42″N 112°34′48″W	27	158 (2018)	Enel Green Power		2014	
Desert Peak	Nevada	39°45′14″N 118°57′13″W	92	91 (2018)	Ormat	Flash steam (71.7%), binary cycle (28.3%)	1985	
Dixie Valley	Nevada	39°57′59″N 117°51′21″W	61	496 (2018)	Terra Gen Power	Flash steam (99%), binary cycle (1%)	1988	
Don A. Campbell	Nevada	38°50′10″N 118°19′27″W	39	327 (2018)	Ormat		2013	
The Geysers	California	38°47′26″N 122°45′21″W	1,590	6,516 (2018)	Calpine, NCPA, SVP, USRG	Dry steam	1960	
Heber	California	32°42′52″N 115°31′37″W	161.5	539 (2018)	Ormat	Binary cycle	1985	
Imperial Valley	California	33°09′48″N 115°37′00″W	432.3	1,741 (2018)	CalEnergy, EnergySource	Dry steam	1982	
Jersey Valley	Nevada	40°10′52″N 117°28′33″W	10	72 (2018)	Ormat		2011	
Lightning Dock	New Mexico	32°08′41″N 108°50′19″W	4	13 (2018)	Zanskar Geothermal & Minerals	Binary cycle	2014	
Mammoth	California	37°38′44″N 118°54′42″W	40	215 (2018)	Ormat	Binary cycle	1984	
McGinness Hills	Nevada	39°35′21″N 116°54′42″W	138	771 (2018)	Ormat	Binary cycle	2012	
Neal Hot Springs	Oregon	44°01′23″N 117°28′04″W	22	176 (2018)	Ormat		2012	
North Brawley	California	33°00′52″N 115°32′27″W	64	56 (2018)	Ormat	Binary cycle	2010	
Ormesa	California	32°46′59″N 115°15′15″W	101.6	268 (2018)	Ormat	Binary cycle	1987	
Patua	Nevada	39°34′58″N 119°04′29″W	70	138 (2018)	Cyrq Energy	Binary cycle (85.7%), solar PV (14.3%)	2017	
Puna (Note: Offline due to the 2018 lower Puna eruption. The Puna Complex was expanded from 38 MW to 46 MW, and was expected to resume operations by the end of 2020.)	Hawaii	19°28′43″N 154°53′20″W	38	323 (2017)	Ormat	Binary cycle	1992	
Raft River	Idaho	42°05′58″N 113°22′57″W	11	83 (2018)	Ormat	Binary cycle	2008	
Salt Wells	Nevada	39°17′40″N 118°34′21″W	13.4	98 (2018)	Enel Green Power	Binary cycle	2012	
San Emidio	Nevada	40°22′50″N 119°23′59″W	11	64 (2018)	Ormat		2012	
Soda Lake	Nevada	39°33′22″N 118°50′53″W	37	61 (2018)	Cyrq Energy		1987	
Steamboat	Nevada	39°23′40″N 119°44′51″W	73 (Note: Was being expanded from 73 MW to 93 MW. Expansion was expected to be complete by the end of 2020.)	507 (2018)	Ormat	Binary cycle (80.3%), flash steam (19.7%)	1988	
Stillwater	Nevada	39°32′45″N 118°33′22″W	75	159 (2018)	Enel Green Power	Binary cycle (65.3%), solar PV (34.7%)	2009	
Thermo 1	Utah	38°09′39″N 113°11′42″W	13	65 (2018)	Cyrq Energy		2013	
Tungsten Mountain	Nevada	39°40′04″N 117°41′35″W	27	213 (2018)	Ormat		2017	
Tuscarora	Nevada	41°28′02″N 116°09′02″W	18	125 (2018)	Ormat		2012	
Wabuska	Nevada	39°09′48″N 119°10′50″W	4 (Note: Was being expanded from 4 MW to 24 MW. Expansion was expected to be complete by the end of 2020.)	9 (2017)	Open Mountain Energy	Binary cycle	1984	

== Proposed ==
Name	State	Location	Capacity (MW)	Owner	Type	Year	Ref
Hell's Kitchen	California	33°11′55″N 115°36′41″W	140	Controlled Thermal Resources		2025	
Fervo Cape	Utah		2000	Fervo Energy		2026	

== See also ==
- List of geothermal power stations
- List of power stations in the United States by type
- Natural hydrogen
- Plasma deep drilling technology
