= Casa Diablo Hot Springs =

Hot spring in California, United States

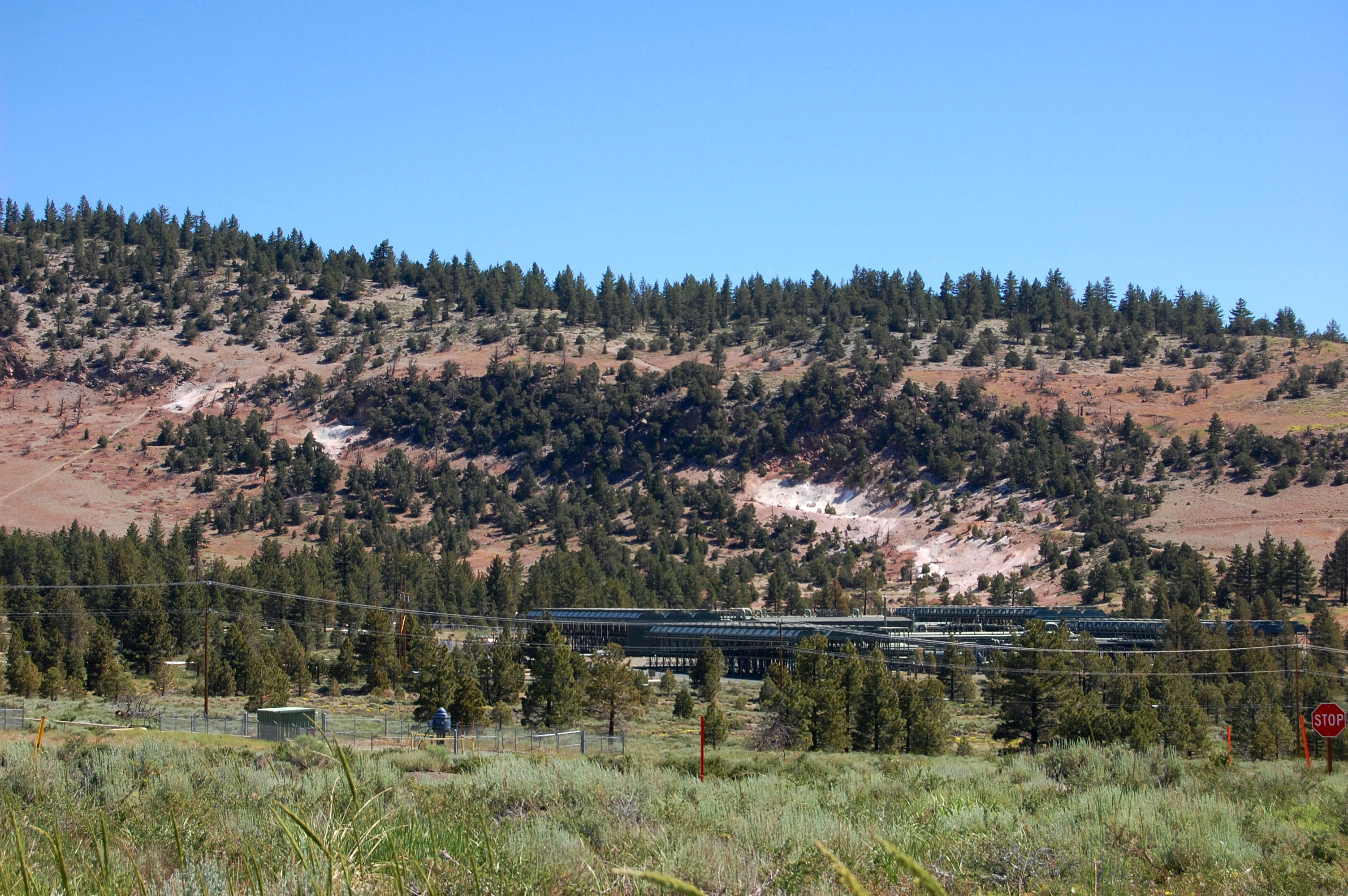
- The power plant (bottom) with the formerly active geothermal areas on the slope above (white areas)
- Interactive map of Casa Diablo Hot Springs
- Location: Mono County, California
- Coordinates: 37°38′47″N 118°54′57″W
- Elevation: 7,319 feet (2,231 m)

Casa Diablo Hot Springs is a hot springs and active geothermal location, near Mammoth Lakes and the Eastern Sierra Nevada, in Mono County, eastern California.

== Geography ==
It is within the northern part of the Long Valley Caldera volcanic feature and zone, and beside U.S. Highway 395. California State Route 203 branches off to the west from the Highway 395 interchange at Casa Diablo Hot Springs, leading to the Mammoth Lakes and ski resort area, and Devils Postpile National Monument.

== History ==
Casa Diablo Hot Springs was once the site of a regularly erupting geyser. It is noted as a Native American mining and manufacturing site specializing in obsidian materials. Use of materials from this site is noted at least as early as the Millingstone Horizon. Peoples as distant as the coastal Chumash people traded for material from this obsidian source.

Casa Diablo became a stage stop along the Bishop Creek to Bodie stagecoach route in 1878 (148 years ago). It was a relay station for the route to the mining camps of Mammoth City, Mill City, Mineral Peak and Pine City. In 1881, Casa Diablo stage station ceased operating and was later used for other business as a trading post, a seasonal resort, a tavern, a gas station, a grocery store, a hardware store and a lumber yard.

== Geothermal power ==
The Mammoth Geothermal Complex is located here, owned by Ormat and operated by Mammoth Pacific, LP. The geothermal plant opened in 1983.

== See also ==
- Long Valley Observatory
- Hot Creek (Mono County, California)
- Mono Basin National Scenic Area
- Mono tribe
- Obsidian hydration
- Projectile point
