= McGinness Hills Geothermal Complex =

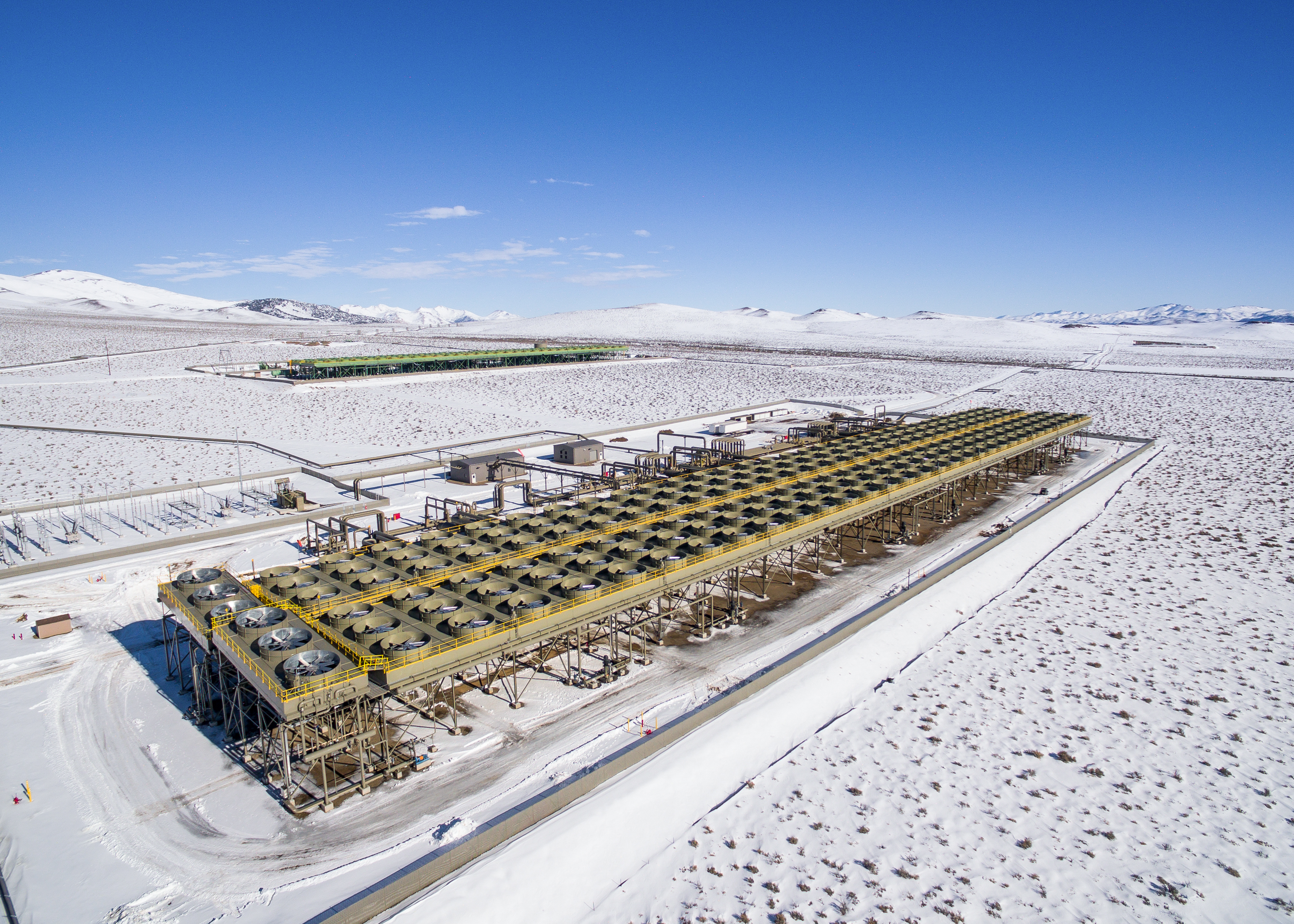
- Official name: McGinness Hills Geothermal Complex
- Country: United States
- Location: Lander County, Nevada
- Coordinates: 39°35′21″N 116°54′42″W
- Status: Operational
- Commission date: Unit 1: July 2012; Unit 2: July 2012; Unit 3: 20 December 2018
- Owner: Ormat
- Operator: Ormat

Geothermal power station
- Type: Binary cycle

Power generation
- Units operational: 2 x 45 MW; 1 x 48 MW
- Nameplate capacity: 138 MW
- Annual net output: 771 GWh (2018)

External links
- Commons: Related media on Commons

The McGinness Hills Geothermal Complex is a complex of 3 geothermal power stations located in a valley between the Toiyabe Range and Simpson Park Range in Lander County, Nevada. It is the largest geothermal complex in Nevada and the fourth largest in the United States.

The complex consists of two 45 MW geothermal power stations that were commissioned in July 2012, as well as a third 48 MW geothermal power station that was commissioned on 20 December 2018. The entire complex is owned by Ormat.

== See also ==
- List of geothermal power stations in the United States
