= San Jacinto Tizate Geothermal Power Plant =

Geothermal power station in Nicaragua

Planta Geotérmica San Jacinto Tizate or San Jacinto Tizate Geothermal Power Plant is a geothermal power plant in Nicaragua.

It has a nameplate capacity of 72 Megawatts electric power. The plant was upgraded from 10 Megawatts of capacity by Polaris Energy Nicaragua S.A. who continue to run the plant as of 2020. As of 2020 it is one of two geothermal power plants in the country, the other being a 78 Megawatt station near Momotombo. Sitting on the Pacific Ring of Fire and nicknaming itself "país de lagos y volcanes", Nicaragua has a large geothermal energy potential but in 2020 only 153.24 MW of the nominal installed capacity of 1619.73 MW were geothermal (a bit under 9.5%) in terms of net capacity, the figure is 93.21 MW out of 1,329.42 MW or just over 7%.

However, due to the high capacity factor and the ability to provide baseload power, geothermal power provided 17.13% of net electricity generation in 2019. In absolute figures, geothermal power provided 703.10 Gigawatt-hours in 2019 compared to an overall electricity production of 4105.48 Gigawatt-hours.

== Expansion ==
In 2021 the CEO of Polaris Infrastructure, the owners of the plant, announced a further expansion of the plant by an additional binary cycle plant with an electric capacity of 7-10 Megawatts electrical power.

== Criticism ==
The opposition aligned newspaper La Prensa has criticized the Daniel Ortega government's decision to invest in geothermal energy on cost grounds.

== See also ==
- geothermal energy in Nicaragua
- List of geothermal power plants
- Electricity sector in Nicaragua
