= Malitbog =

Malitbog is the name of several places in the Philippines:

- Malitbog, Bukidnon, a 2nd class municipality in the province of Bukidnon, Philippines
- Malitbog, Southern Leyte, a 4th class municipality in the province of Southern Leyte, Philippines

== See also ==
- Malitbog Geothermal Power Station
