= Mill City =

Mill City may refer to:

- Mill City, Mono County, California
- Mill City, Oregon
- Mill City, Nevada
- nickname for Lowell, Massachusetts
- nickname for Minneapolis, Minnesota
