= Puna Geothermal Venture =

Geothermal power plant in Hawaii

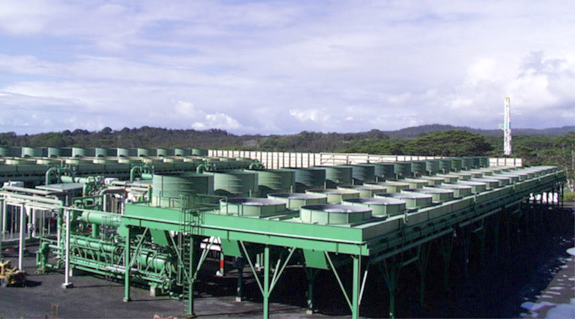
- Country: United States
- Location: Puna, Hawaii
- Coordinates: 19.4785°N 154.8888°W
- Status: Operational
- Construction began: 1989
- Commission date: 1993
- Owner: Ormat Technologies

Geothermal power station
- Type: Binary cycle
- Wells: 11
- Max. well depth: 8,297 feet (2,529 m)
- Combined cycle?: Yes

Power generation
- Nameplate capacity: 38 MW

External links
- Website: hawaiianelectric.com/clean-energy-hawaii/clean-energy-facts/renewable-energy-sources/geothermal/puna-geothermal-venture-(pgv)
- Commons: Related media on Commons

The Puna Geothermal Venture (PGV) is a geothermal energy power plant on the island of Hawaii, the largest island in the state of Hawaii. PGV is the first and only commercial geothermal power plant in Hawaii. Constructed on a site adjacent to failed experimental wells drilled and operated by the Hawaii Geothermal Project in the 1970s and 80s, construction on the generating facility began in 1989 and was completed in 1993.

The plant was shut down shortly after the start of the May 2018 lower Puna eruption, and resumed power generation in November 2020.

The plant had a generating capacity of 25 MW when it opened in 1993, increasing to 38 MW by 2012, from six production wells and five injection wells along Kīlauea’s East rift zone. Its output is sold to Hawaiian Electric Industries (also known as HELCO). The plant generated up to 25% of the island’s electrical energy in 2016. A project is underway to increase the generating capacity to a maximum of 46 MW.

== History ==
=== Early exploration and development ===
The first exploratory geothermal wells in Kapoho were drilled in 1961–62. The effort was spearheaded by local landowner Richard Lyman following a trip to Japan, where he learned of a project to lay underwater power cables between the country's islands. Upon returning to Hawaii, Lyman promoted geothermal power generation in Puna, distributed to Oahu and other population centers by underwater cables, as a way of developing the economy. He found business partners to establish Hawaii Magma Power in 1961. Exploratory wells were drilled before the company validated their insufficient potential, although Lyman claimed to the Honolulu Advertiser that the company "had mechanical difficulties and gave up."

=== Hawaii Geothermal Project ===
In the 1970s, the Hawaii Geothermal Project was formed to conduct federal and state-funded research. After studies of the geology and geothermal potential of the area were completed, a site for the first well was chosen in 1975. Drilling began without environmental impact studies or a period for public input. At the time, the area around the drill site was rural and undisturbed, but subdivisions were planned nearby. The well was occasionally allowed to discharge gas and fluid from the borehole, which created a loud noise and release pollutants into the air. By 1976, three subdivisions nearby had been established and were beginning to house residents, including twelve families who lived within one mile of the well. The continued noise pollution and toxic gas discharges began to cause concern and opposition from the residents. Funds were secured from the federal and state governments to turn the well's geothermal energy into electricity. Although HELCO was among the project stakeholders, they assured stockholders that they would not invest the company's capital in the project due to the volcanic and seismic risk at the site.

An experimental 3 MW generator was completed in 1981 and remained operational throughout the 1980s. However, families continued to build and move into the nearby subdivisions, resulting in several attempts and a failed lawsuit to stop the noise and pollution. Since the site was within a lava hazard zone, the generator was built on skids and housed in a building which included a crane so that the generator could be removed if lava flows threatened the facility. Additionally, the wellhead was housed in a concrete bunker that could be sealed to prevent lava from damaging the wellhead. Despite the opposition and the operating losses incurred by operating and maintaining the generator, there was enough support to keep the generator operating. In April 1989, county officials raised concerns about the condition of the facility following a minor blowout and considered reviewing and possibly revoking the operating permit for the site. After several additional incidents at the site in 1989, the facility was ordered to shut, which occurred on December 11. During its life, the HGP generator produced between 15 and 19 million kilowatt hours of electricity annually.

=== Puna Geothermal Venture ===
In 1980, HELCO requested a proposal for 25 MW of geothermal electricity generation. A joint venture was formed that year between two of Lyman's companies and two other companies to produce geothermal energy on a 500-acre (200 ha) parcel leased from the Lyman family. The joint venture was renamed Puna Geothermal Venture in 1981. Over the following years, PGV drilled three wells, but all suffered from well casing mechanical failures and were unusable.

In 1986, PGV secured a contract with HELCO to supply 25 MW of electricity by 1993. PGV promised that they would adopt technology that would result in zero emissions and operate at a drastically lower noise level. In 1989, when the HGP facility was facing growing problems, the PGV proposed facility managed to overcome enough local opposition to be granted a permit from the local planning commission.

The plant raised local concerns as a result of occasional toxic emissions. In 1991, well KS-8 suffered a blowout, causing the state to suspend the permits for the plant. In 2016 the plant's owners were found to be in violation of U.S. Environmental Protection Agency standards regarding hydrogen sulfide releases and was fined $76,500 for two incidents in 2013. Additional concerns and opposition to the plant were raised by Native Hawaiians, who viewed all forms of volcanic activity as demigod Pele manifestations. They declared geothermal wells and energy production to be a desecration.

In 2005 during the drilling of the KS-13 well, magma was encountered at a depth of 8,163 ft (2,488 m). The borehole had to be redrilled several times as the magma flowed up the borehole, cooling into clear, colorless glass. The magma, at a temperature of approximately 1,922 °F (1,050 °C), was dacitic—similar to the granitic rock that forms continents—consisting of approximately two-thirds silica, which contrasts with the dark, iron-rich basaltic rock that forms most of the Hawaiian Islands. It was encountered after drilling through a 240 ft (73 m) layer of diorite igneous rock, which suggested to researchers that the magma had chemically separated as it dwelled for a long period. As quoted in Nature, the team said it was possibly the first time that "the actual process of differentiation of continental-type rock from primitive ocean basalt has been observed in situ". Magma specialist Bruce Marsh of Johns Hopkins University described the uniqueness of the encounter: "Before, all we had to deal with were lava flows; but they are the end of a magma's life. They're lying there on the surface, they've de-gassed. It's not the natural habitat. It's the difference between looking at dinosaur bones in a museum and seeing a real, living dinosaur roaming out in the field."

PGV had a generating capacity of 25 MW when it opened in 1993, growing to 30 MW in 1995 and 38 MW in 2012. In 2015, HELCO announced that Ormat was the winner of a bid to add 25 MW of geothermal generating capacity in the Puna district. In March 2018, Ormat announced their plan to increase production at the plant by 8 MW—from 38 MW to 46 MW—by 2020.

=== Lava damage and closure in 2018 ===
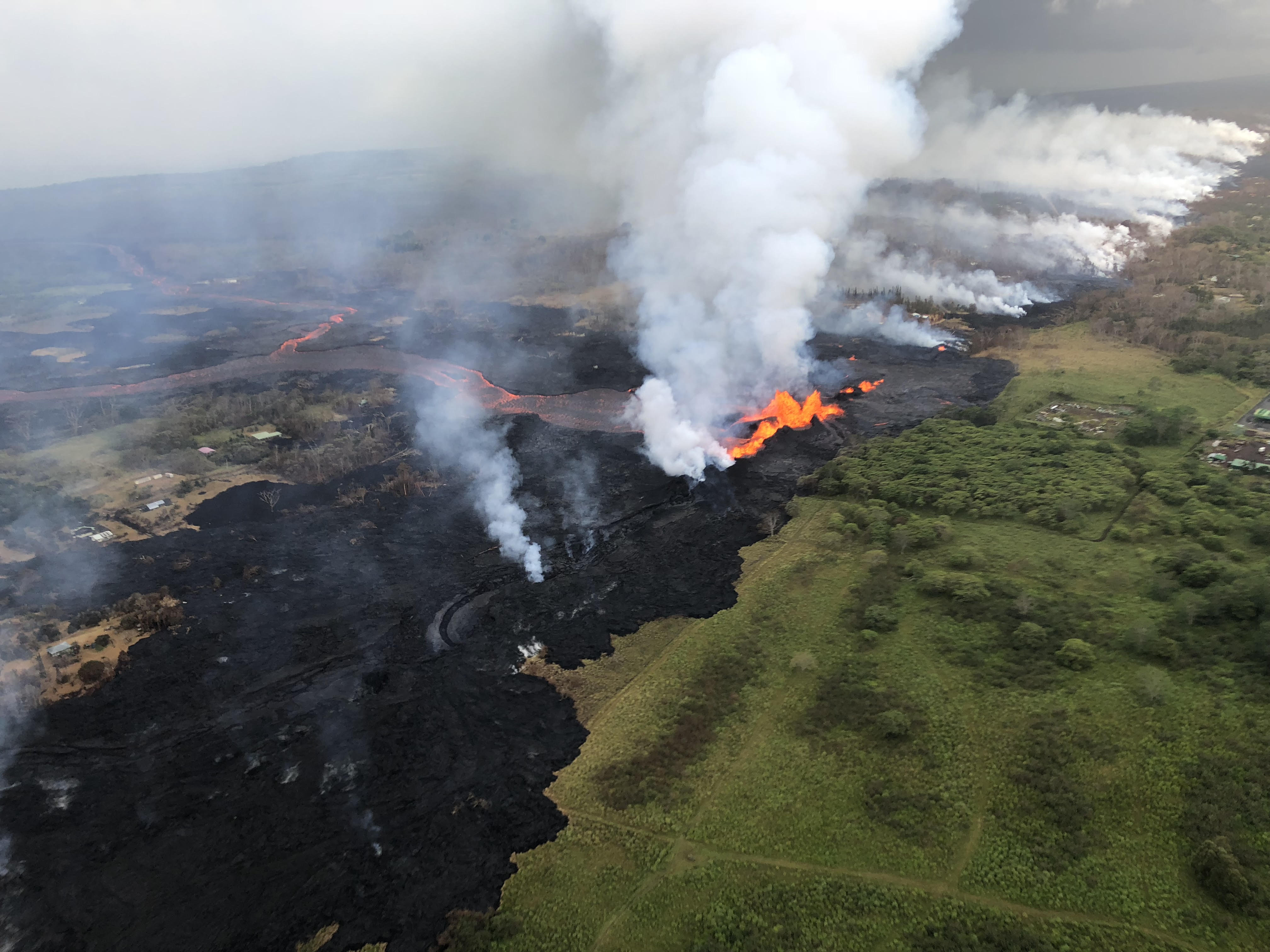

Southern part of the Puna Geothermal Venture (red circle) is seen nearby the lava fountains of Kīlauea volcano

On May 3, 2018, earth fissures opened inside and around the Leilani Estates subdivision near the PGV plant, following hundreds of earthquakes over the first two days of May. Concerns of possible toxic hydrogen sulfide gas releases and explosions at the geothermal power facility led to preemptive equipment shutdowns and inventorying its stockpile of highly-flammable pentane. Earthquake frequency began increasing and the first cracks appeared in Leilani Estates on May 1–2; the plant was taken off-line approximately three hours after it received the first report that lava had begun to flow on May 3. All pentane stored at PGV, approximately 60,000 US gallons (230,000 L; 50,000 imp gal), was removed by the morning of May 10.

Over the following weeks, the wells were stabilized with cold water—the weight of the water was sufficient to prevent steam from rising—and allow them to be plugged. One well, KS-14, possibly super-heated from close proximity to magma, could not be quenched and was filled with drilling mud in an attempt to stabilize it. The wells were then sealed with metallic plugs, which arrived at the site on May 22, that PGV officials claimed could withstand 2,000 °F (1,090 °C) lava. Tom Travis of the Hawaii Emergency Management Agency, claimed that he researched and was unable to find any precedent for lava overrunning a geothermal well that had been shut down like the wells at PGV. The PGV team had spoken with scientists in Iceland who have operated wells within lava fields and provided insights into how lava might affect the wellhead.

Lava approached several of the capped wells on May 27. Capped KS-5 and KS-6 wells were inundated by the lava from fissures 7 and 21 on May 27 and 28. The event was the first time lava had covered a geothermal well. On May 30 a substation and a warehouse containing a drilling rig were overrun and destroyed by molten rock, cutting the main access road to the facility. A third well was inundated thereafter.

Despite the shutdown, Hawaii Electric Light did not expect blackouts on the Big Island to be caused by insufficient power generation as older, diesel-fueled generators were brought on-line.

=== 2020 restart and 2022 proposed expansion ===
Work began on drilling in late 2019. The plant resumed reduced operations in November 2020.

As of early 2022, the Puna Geothermal Venture power plant was reported to be producing approximately 25.7 MW of electric power for the Big Island.

In July 2022 it was announced that an expansion of PGV's power output was proposed. The plan, called the Repower Project, has a goal of 46 MW in Phase 1 and then to 60 MW in Phase 2, and would implement the increase in power generation by replacing 12 operating power-generating units with as many as four upgraded power-generating units, operating on the existing grounds of the current facility.

PGV published an Environmental Impact Statement Preparation Notice on the July 23, 2022 edition of “The Environmental Notice”. In February 2024, it was announced that a new power purchase agreement was obtained, allowing a maximum of 46 MW and a minimum of 30 MW. This would be achieved by replacing old units with three new units within three years.

== Kapoho Geothermal Reservoir ==
PGV is located in the East Rift Zone of the Kīlauea volcano, which forms part of Hawaii Island. The geothermal energy reservoir there is known as the Kapoho Geothermal Reservoir. The geothermal energy potential of the East Rift Zone is estimated to exceed 200 MW. The geothermal reservoir is contained within basaltic rock and relies on the permeability of two major fracture systems. Both fracture systems have large openings, recorded by the drop of 8.5 in (220 mm) drillbits for up to 30 ft (9.1 m).

== Facilities ==
Location of plants and well pads

The plant is owned by Ormat Technologies which purchased it in 2004.

=== Power plants ===
Two power plants operate in the Puna Complex. The first plant consists of ten Combined cycle Ormat Energy Converters (OEC) made up of ten steam turbines and ten binary turbines and opened in 1993. The second plant consists of two Binary cycle OECs that entered service in 2011 and commenced commercial operation in 2012.

=== Wells ===
As of December 2017, six production wells and five injection wells made up the Puna Complex.

List of wells as of September 2014
Well	Wellfield	Type	Depth	Status after 2018 eruption
Kapoho State 1A (KS-1A)	Pad A	Injection		
Kapoho State 3 (KS-3)	Pad E	Injection		
Kapoho State 5 (KS-5)	Pad E	Production		Covered by lava
Kapoho State 6 (KS-6)	Pad E	Production	6,532 feet (1,991 m)	Covered by lava
Kapoho State 9 (KS-9)	Pad A	Production		
Kapoho State 10 (KS-10)	Pad A	Production	5,210 feet (1,590 m)	
Kapoho State 11 (KS-11)	Pad A	Injection	6,500 feet (2,000 m)	
Kapoho State 13 (KS-13)	Pad A	Injection	8,297 feet (2,529 m)	
Kapoho State 14 (KS-14)	Pad E	Production		In proximity to magma
Kapoho State 15 (KS-15)	Pad B	Injection		
Kapoho State 16 (KS-16)	Pad A	Production		
Kapoho State 17 (KS-17)	Pad E	Production		

As of 2008, the five active production wells had a surface elevation of 620 ft (190 m) above sea level and produce a mixture of steam and brine. The five wells produced an average of 600,000 lb/hour (270,000 kg/hour) of steam and 1,200,000 lb/hour (545,000 kg/hour) of brine. The temperature of fluids emerging from the production wells is approximately 640 °F (338 °C), which is returned to the injection wells at approximately 300–400 °F (149–204 °C).

=== Alternative uses of geothermally-heated fluids ===
In addition to electricity generation, additional uses of the facility have been suggested. Andrea Gill of the Hawaii Department of Business, Economic Development, and Tourism—on behalf of a working group established to consider direct uses of the geothermal energy at PGV and its vicinity—outlined potential direct uses of the fluids as well as shallow groundwater wells in its vicinity, including fruit and macadamia nut dehydration, aquaculture and greenhouse heating, pasteurization and sterilization, geothermal/health spas, and geothermal heat pumps. At PGV, hot brine after being utilized to generate electricity is approximately 300–400 °F (149–204 °C) when it is reinjected; the brine could be tapped for its thermal energy before reinjection. Water wells under 750 ft (230 m) in the vicinity of PGV have recorded temperatures up to 193 °F (89 °C).

In 2005, after a drill hit an uncommonly-observed type of magma, researchers and PGV expressed a desire to turn the borehole into an observatory for scientific studies.
