= Blundell Geothermal Power Plant =

Geothermal Power Plant

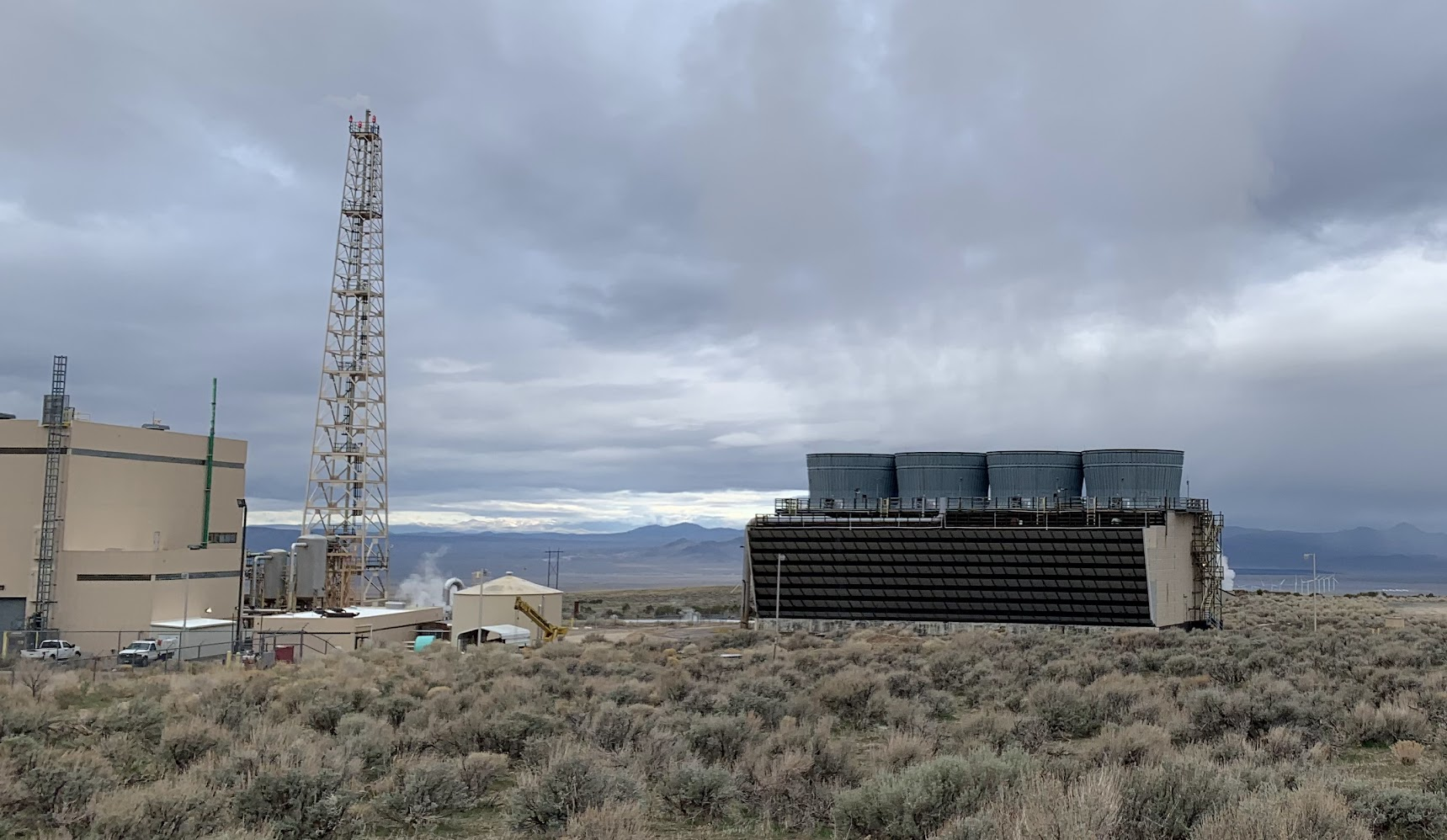
- Country: United States
- Location: Beaver County, Utah
- Coordinates: 38°21′21″N 113°14′10″W
- Status: Operational
- Construction began: 1981
- Commission date: 1984
- Operator: PacifiCorp Energy

Geothermal power station
- Type: Binary cycle
- Min. source temp.: 450 °F (232 °C)
- Wells: 4 Production
- Max. well depth: 6,500 ft (2,000 m)

Power generation
- Make and model: Ormat Technologies
- Nameplate capacity: 33 Net MW

The Blundell Geothermal Power Plant, named after former president of Utah Power and Light Harry Blundell, is located in Beaver County Utah, roughly 12 miles northeast of the town of Milford, and is owned and operated by PacifiCorp Energy. Energy for this plant is supplied by Roosevelt Hot Springs. Roosevelt Hot Springs consists of intertonguing coarse-grained highly permeable and fine-grained low permeability rocks creating alternating zones that encompass more than 30,000 acres (121 km^{2}) along a north–south fault to the west of the Mineral Mountains. Ground water is heated by intrusive volcanic rock that is in turn replenished by rain and snow in the Mineral Mountains that travels through highly fractured and permeable flow zones, which are estimated to be 840 feet (256 m) thick. This area contains scaling water and steam, poisonous gas, bubbling pools, boiling mud, unstable ground and a reservoir temperature upwards of 600 °F (315 °C).

This natural resource had been utilized by native inhabitants for centuries for bathing and washing and nearby descendants of European settlers as early as the late 19th century with the establishment of bath houses. However, interest in the development of the first geothermal energy production facility outside of California began in the 1970s with the initial production wells being drilled between 1975 and 1979[2]. In 1980 Phillips Petroleum and Utah Power and Light, now known as PacifiCorp, signed the first geothermal unit agreement to be approved by the U.S. Department of the Interior. Construction of this unit, the first geothermal single flash plant in Utah, began in 1981 and was completed in 1984. Blundell Unit 1 consists of three injection wells and four production wells, with depths between 2,500 and 6,500 feet used to produce 2.25 million pounds per hour of heated geothermal brine at a temperature of 450 °F. This system generates 26 Megawatts with a net production of 23 MW, enough to power 23,000 homes, by flashing 400,000 pounds of steam per hour, and then returning any leftover brine to the formation.

In 2007 a second unit was completed and brought online utilizing the spent brine, which has a temperature of 350 °F from the primary unit. This second unit, Blundell Unit 2, makes use of the Ormat bottoming cycle and an iso-pentane working fluid to generate 11 MW of power, net output of 10 MW, which gives a total net energy output of 33 MW.

Exploratory wells for an additional expansion were drilled with the project expected to double production to 72 MW, however this development has since been canceled.
