= BacMan Geothermal Power Plant =

Geothermal power plant in Bicol, Philippines

- Country: Philippines
- Location: Sorsogon City, Sorsogon and Manito, Albay
- Coordinates: 13°03′36″N 123°55′46″E
- Status: Operational
- Commission date: September 1993
- Owner: Bac-Man Geothermal Inc.
- Operator: Bac-Man Geothermal Inc.

Geothermal power station
- Type: Flash steam / Binary cycle

Power generation
- Units operational: 5 units (3 power stations)
- Units decommissioned: 1 unit
- Nameplate capacity: 209.8-MW

The Bac-Man Geothermal Production Field, also known as the BacMan Geothermal Power Plant, is one of the geothermal power stations owned and operated by Energy Development Corporation via its subsidiary Bac-Man Geothermal Inc. in the provinces of Albay and Sorsogon in the Philippines. It is named for its location in the municipalities of Bacon (a district since merged with Sorsogon City) and Manito.

== History ==
=== Under PNOC-EDC ===
The state-owned Philippine National Oil Company (PNOC) conducted exploration on the Bacon-Manito (BacMan) geothermal reservation in the mid-1970s. Francis Palafox was the project manager of the geothermal project for a power station originally planned to have 170-MW capacity (two 55-MW units, and one 60-MW unit). The Energy Development Corporation (EDC) was a subsidiary of the PNOC at the time.

The BacMan Geothermal Power Plant's first unit BacMan I consist of two 55-MW power units which was commissioned in 1993. BacMan II also had two 20-MW units. The Cawayan and Botong plants of BacMan II were commissioned on 1994 and 1998 respectfully.

In 2002, there were plans to build a 70-MW unit in barangays Masud and Pangpang in Sorsogon City as part of the Tanowon project which was met with environmental concerns from residents due to its proximity to a watershed.

The privatization of the EDC began as early as 2005. By early 2007, the national government has lost majority stakes on EDC. The government sold its remaining stakes to the First Gen Corporation of the Lopez Group. The power stations were shut down in 2009.

=== Under privatized EDC ===
The Energy Development Corporation (EDC) acquired the power stations from the government in May 2010.The plant at the time of its acquisition had a total capacity of 130-MW with only one unit of the two in BacMan II retained.

EDC started rehabilitation works on the existing facilities and by 2013, BacMan I is now fully refurbished and operational with Unit 1 and Unit 2 activated on January 27 and February 11, 2013 respectively. By November 2014, Unit 3, the sole-unit in BacMan II was already operational.

The BacMan facility was expanded further when EDC began the construction of the 28.9-MW Palayan Binary Geothermal Power Plant (PBGPP) in June 2021. It became operational on July 5, 2024.

The Tanawon Geothermal Power Plant is a 22-MW geothermal power station within the complex was commissioned on August 1, 2025.

== Facilities ==
Power station	Unit	Capacity	Commissioned
BacMan I	BacMan Unit 1	55-MW	1993
BacMan I	BacMan Unit 2	55-MW	1993
BacMan II	BacMan Unit 3 (Cawayan)	20-MW	1994
BacMan II	N/A (Botong)	20-MW	1998 (decommissioned)
Palayan Binary		28.9-MW	2024
Tanawon		22-MW	2025
