= Mammoth Geothermal Complex =

Geothermal field in Mono County, California, US

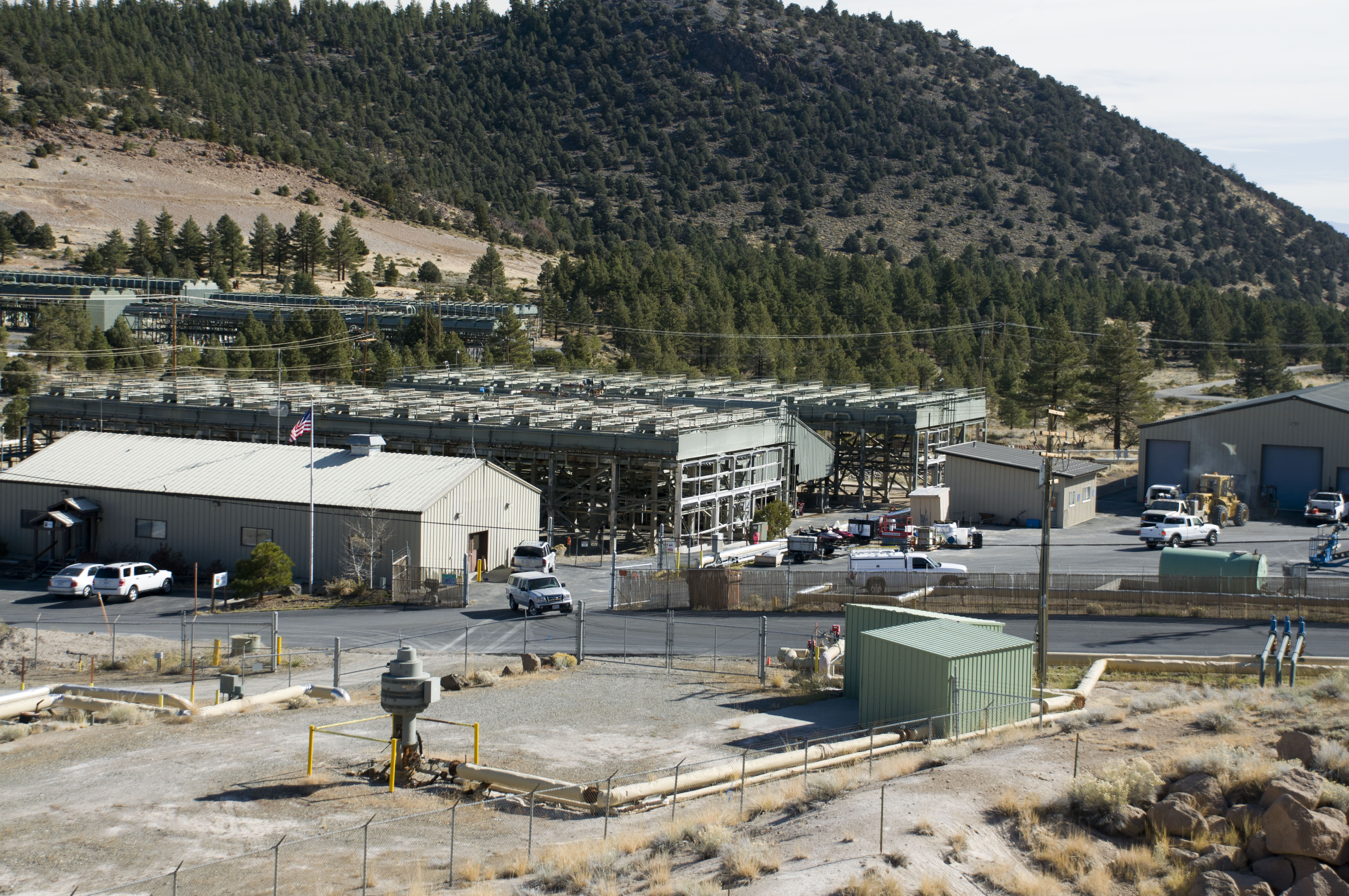
- Official name: Mammoth Geothermal Complex
- Country: United States
- Location: Casa Diablo Hot Springs; Mono County, California
- Coordinates: 37°38′44″N 118°54′42″W
- Status: Operational
- Commission date: Unit 1: 1984; Unit 2: 1990; Unit 3: 1990; Unit 4: 2022
- Owner: Ormat
- Operator: Mammoth Pacific

Geothermal power station
- Type: Binary cycle

Power generation
- Units operational: 3 x 29 MW, 1 x 30 MW
- Nameplate capacity: 60 MW
- Annual net output: 215 GWh (2018)

External links
- Website: Mammoth Pacific
- Commons: Related media on Commons

The Mammoth Geothermal Complex is a complex of four geothermal power stations located at Casa Diablo Hot Springs about 3 miles (4.8 km) east of Mammoth Lakes, California. The complex is owned by Ormat and operated by its subsidiary Mammoth Pacific.

== Description ==
The complex consists of four binary-cycle geothermal power stations, with a combined nameplate capacity of 60 MW. Mammoth Pacific 1 (MP1) was commissioned in 1984 and was the first air-cooled geothermal power station in the world. Mammoth Pacific 2 (MPII) and PLES-1 were both commissioned in 1990 and use the same air-cooled technology.

In 2005, the geothermal well field was expanded into Basalt Canyon just west of the three power stations. Two production wells were drilled and connected to the existing power plants. In 2014, Ormat replaced the 30-year-old equipment of MP1 in order to improve its efficiency.

=== Casa Diablo IV ===
In 2006, Ormat proposed the construction of a 30 MW binary cycle geothermal power plant called Casa Diablo IV that would double the generating capacity of the geothermal complex.

In 2014, the Mammoth Community Water District (MCWD) sued the Great Basin Unified Air Pollution Control District (GBUAP) and ORNI 50 LLC (Ormat) over concerns that the power plant would compromise the water supply of Mammoth Lakes. GBUAP and Ormat disputed this, arguing there was no connectivity between the deep geothermal reservoir and MCWD's groundwater aquifer based on extensive research conducted on the site. On June 25, 2015, the Mono County Superior Court ruled in favor of GBUAP and Ormat. In addition, on August 31, 2015, the Interior Board of Land Appeals denied an appeal made by MCWD.

As of July 14, 2022, Ormat announced that commercial operations at Casa Diablo IV had begun. Casa Diablo IV was the first geothermal plant to come online in California in 30 years.

== Geology ==
The Mammoth Geothermal Complex is located at the base of a large resurgent dome near the center of the Long Valley Caldera. The dome was formed from the swelling or rising of the caldera floor due to movement in the magma chamber beneath it. The geothermal heat produced from the magma chamber below the dome causes groundwater to boil and turn to steam, creating fumaroles such as those seen in Fumarole Valley and along Hot Creek about 5 miles (8.0 km) to the northeast. The geothermal complex utilizes this heat to power its binary-cycle power generators.

== See also ==
- List of geothermal power stations in the United States
- List of power stations in California
