= Palinpinon Geothermal Power Plant =

Power station in the Philippines

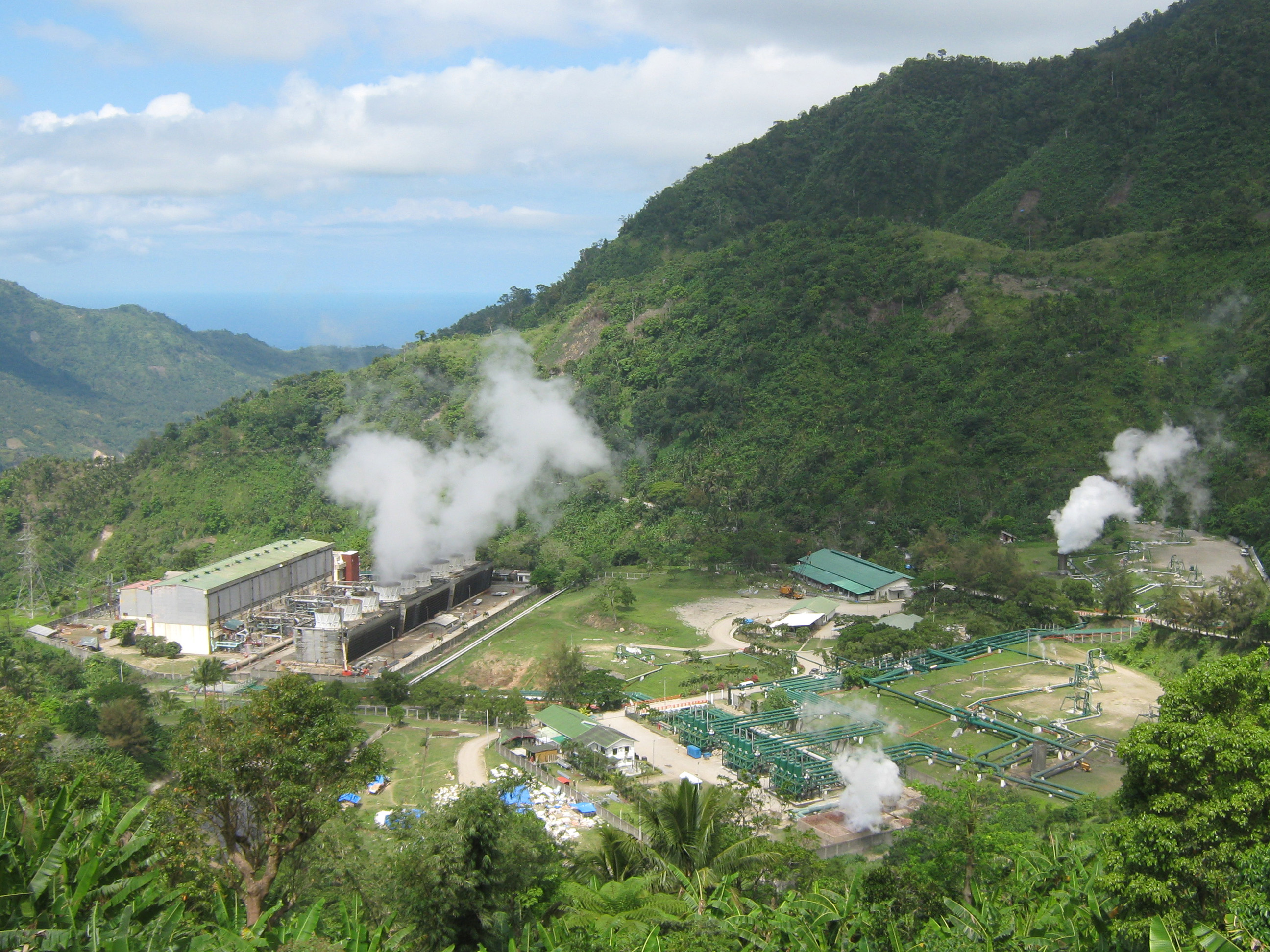
- Palinpinon I in Puhagan, Valencia
- Country: Philippines
- Location: Valencia, Negros Oriental
- Coordinates: Palinpinon I 9°17′36.6″N 123°10′18.1″E; Palinpinon II; 9°16′51.4″N 123°08′49.5″E
- Status: Operational
- Commission date: 1983
- Owner: Energy Development Corporation
- Operator: Energy Development Corporation

Power generation
- Nameplate capacity: 192.5 MW

The Palinpinon Geothermal Power Plant is a 192.5-MW complex of geothermal power stations in Valencia, Negros Oriental, Philippines

== Background ==
The first power station was commissioned in 1983, amidst a global oil crisis which began in 1973. It was operated by the state-owned Philippine National Oil Company-Energy Development Corporation (PNOC-EDC).

The Power Sector Assets and Liabilities Management Corporation (PSALM) would privatize the geothermal facility and place the facility under bidding.

Former PNOC affiliate, Energy Development Corporation (EDC) which became fully privatized in 2007, took over the operations of the Palinpinon facility in October 2009.

== Facilities ==
The Palinpinon Geothermal Power Plant consists of two stations Palinpinon I and Palinpinon II which are located 5 kilometers (3.1 mi) apart. Both sources steam from the Southern Negros Geothermal Production Field (SNGPF).

Power station	Unit		Capacity	Commissioned
Palinpinon I	3x steam turbines		112.5-MW (3 x 37.5-MW)	1983
Palinpinon II	Nasuji		20-MW	1993
Palinpinon II	Okoy 5		20-MW	1994
Palinpinon II	Sogongon	1	20-MW	1995
Palinpinon II	Sogongon	2	20-MW	1995
Total				192.5-MW
