= Blue Mountain Faulkner 1 Geothermal Power Plant =

- Country: United States
- Location: Humboldt County, Nevada
- Coordinates: 40°59′43″N 118°08′34″W
- Status: Operational
- Commission date: October 2009
- Construction cost: US$180 million
- Owner: Ormat Technologies
- Operator: Nevada Geothermal Power

Geothermal power station
- Type: Binary cycle
- Min. source temp.: 302 °F (150 °C)
- Wells: 5
- Max. well depth: 8,000 ft (2,400 m)

Power generation
- Nameplate capacity: 50 MW

Blue Mountain Faulkner 1 Geothermal Power Plant is a geothermal power plant located in Humboldt County, Nevada, United States. It was acquired by Ormat Technologies in 2025. It was operated by AltaRock Energy since 2015 and, previously, Nevada Geothermal Power Inc. Produced electricity is sold to NV Energy through a 21-mile (34 km) 120-kV transmission line to the transmission grid connection at Mill City, Nevada.

The plant was completed in October 2009. It has an installed capacity of 50 megawatts (67,000 hp). As of November 2010, the plant operated at a net output of 37 megawatts (50,000 hp). It is a binary cycle geothermal plant, which uses a closed-loop heat exchange system. In this system hot geothermal water with an average temperature of 302 °F (150 °C) heats a secondary fluid, isobutane, which is vaporized and used to run a turbine. The geothermal water is supplied by five production wells and injected by six injection wells. There is a program to add three new production wells. The depth of wells is 4,000–8,000 feet (1,200–2,400 m).

The technology was supplied by Ormat Technologies. The well drilling contractors were ThermaSource and Ensign. The piping contractor was JFMPE and the reservoir engineering was handled by GeoThermEx Inc. The plant cost US$180 million, of which $57.9 million was funded under the American Reinvestment and Recovery Act.
