= Imperial Valley Geothermal Project =

Geothermal power project in California

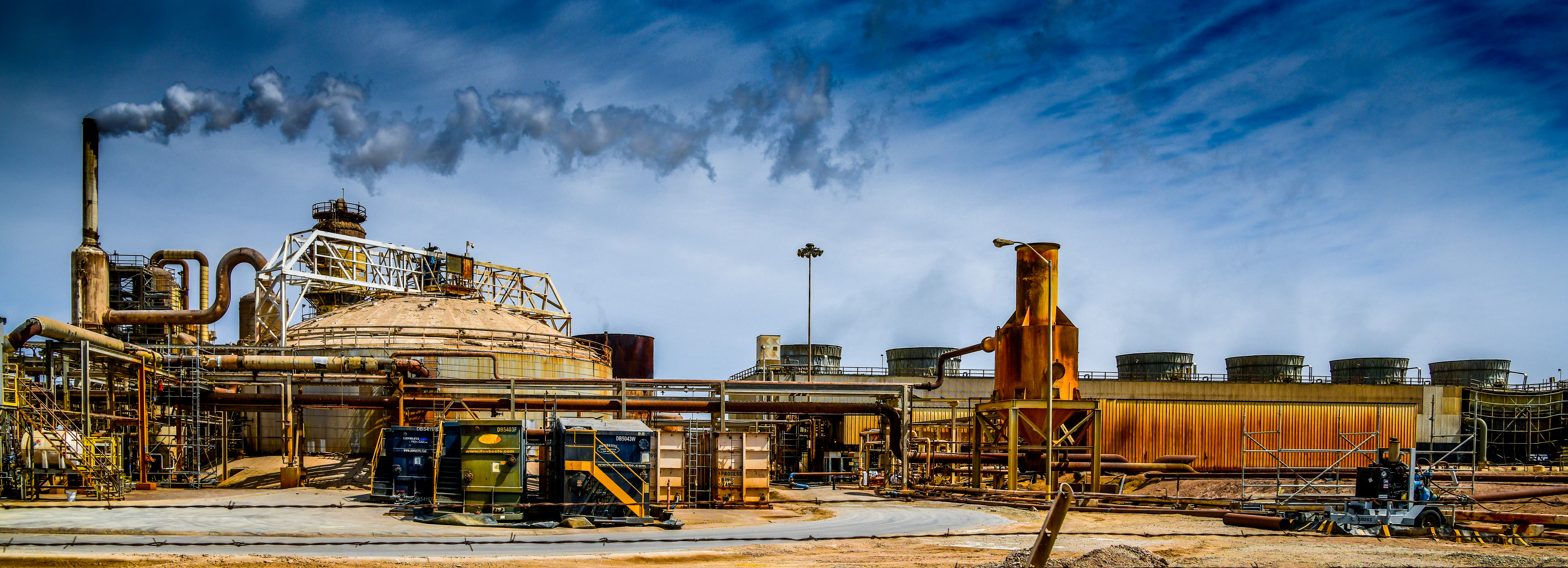
- The J.M. Leathers Geothermal Power Station
- Official name: Imperial Valley Geothermal Project
- Country: United States
- Location: Near Calipatria; Imperial County, California
- Coordinates: 33°09′48″N 115°37′00″W
- Status: Operational
- Commission date: 1982
- Owners: BHE Renewables (86.4%); EnergySource (13.6%)
- Operator: BHE Renewables

Geothermal power station
- Type: Dry steam

Power generation
- Units operational: 14 units (11 power stations)
- Units planned: 1 unit
- Nameplate capacity: 432.3 MW
- Annual net output: 1,741 GWh (2018)

External links
- Commons: Related media on Commons

Imperial Valley Geothermal Project is a complex of eleven geothermal power stations located in the Salton Sea Geothermal Field, along the southeastern shore of the Salton Sea in the Imperial Valley of California. It is the second largest geothermal field in the United States after The Geysers in Northern California.

== Description ==
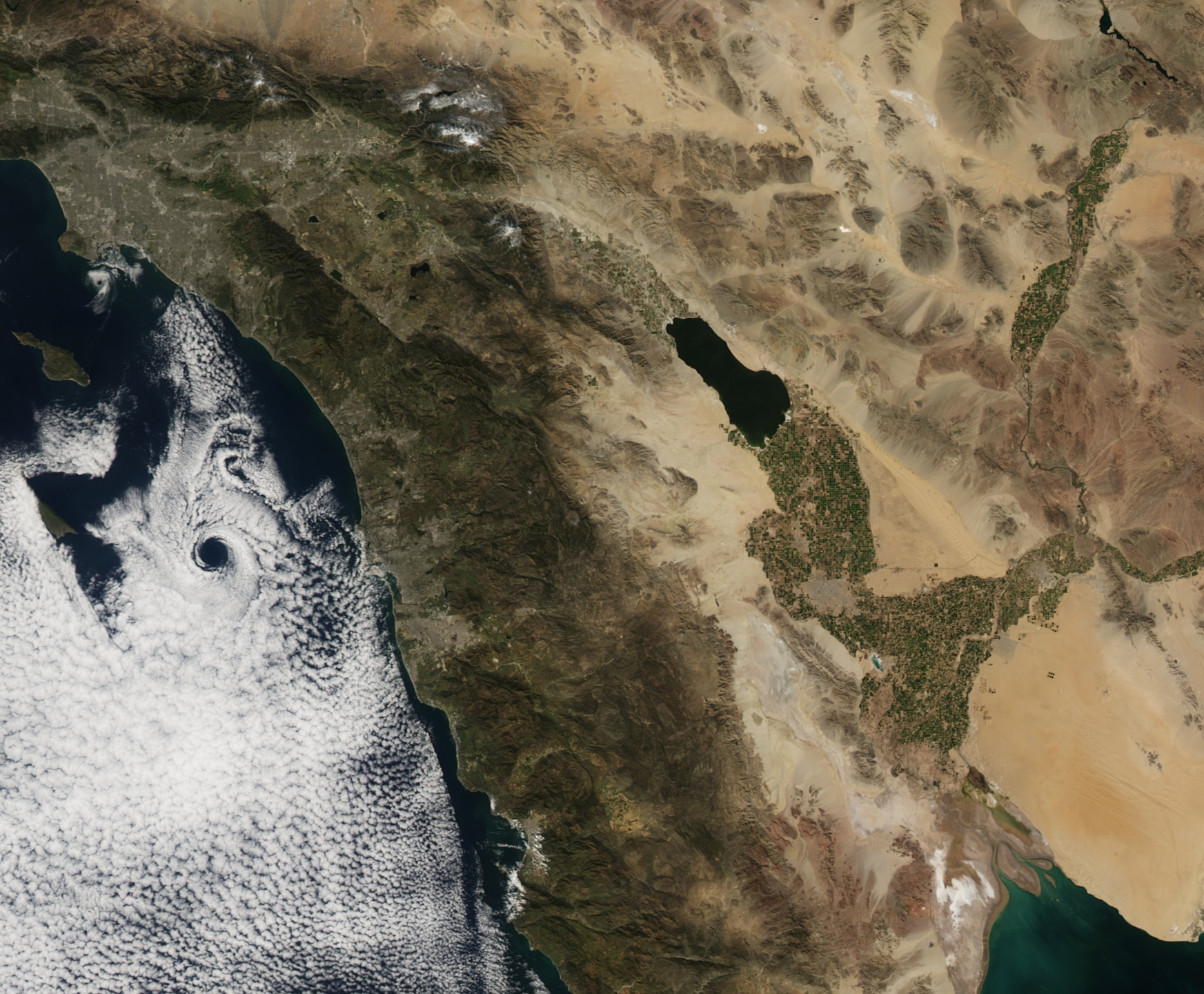
Salton Trough area. The red lines are simplified faults. Right-lateral direction of motion of the transform fault is shown (pink arrows). The red rhombs are pull-apart basins; the northern one is the site of the Niland (Salton Sea) geothermal field, the southern the Cerro Prieto geothermal field.

Parts of Imperial Valley lie atop the Salton Sea Geothermal Field, a region of high geothermal energy with an estimated 2,950 MW of geothermal potential. Of that total, 2,250 MW are currently developable, while the remaining 700 MW would become available as the Salton Sea (a saline lake) dries up. About 403 MW is generated by the existing power plants, ten of which are owned by BHE Renewables and one by EnergySource.

=== Geothermal power and lithium extraction ===
The geothermal activity below the Salton Sea loosens up lithium that can be mined. The California Energy Commission estimates the Salton Sea might produce 600k metric tons of lithium carbonate (Li_{2}CO_{3}) per year, of a reserve of 3.4 million tonnes.

In 2016, the Australian firm Controlled Thermal Resources (CTR) announced plans to build a 140 MW geothermal power plant and a lithium extraction facility capable of producing 15,000 tons (13,600 tonnes) by 2023 and 75,000 tons (68,000 tonnes) by 2027. The company hopes to create a major new domestic source of the mineral, which is a key ingredient used in batteries for electric cars and energy storage. The project is expected to be operational by 2023. General Motors announced a strategic partnership with CTR in 2021 to secure a local supply of lithium. The majority of the battery-grade lithium hydroxide and carbonate for the Ultium battery will come from this plant.

== Geothermal power stations ==
This is a table of all constituent geothermal power stations.

Name	Units	Type	Status	Capacity (MW)	Owner	Commissioned
A.W. Hoch	1	Dry steam	Operational	45.5	BHE Renewables	1989
CE Turbo	1	Dry steam	Operational	11.5	BHE Renewables	2000
Hell's Kitchen	?	Dry steam	Planned	140	CT Resources	(2025)
J.J. Elmore	1	Dry steam	Operational	45.5	BHE Renewables	1989
J.L. Featherstone	1	Dry steam	Operational	55	EnergySource	March 2012
J.M. Leathers	1	Dry steam	Operational	45.5	BHE Renewables	1990
Salton Sea 1	1	Dry steam	Operational	10	BHE Renewables	1982
Salton Sea 2	3	Dry steam	Operational	20	BHE Renewables	1990
Salton Sea 3	1	Dry steam	Operational	54	BHE Renewables	1989
Salton Sea 4	1	Dry steam	Operational	47.5	BHE Renewables	1996
Salton Sea 5	1	Dry steam	Operational	58.3	BHE Renewables	2000
Vulcan	2	Dry steam	Operational	39.6	BHE Renewables	1985
J.G. McIntosh	1	Closed loop	Abandoned	18.5	GeoGenCo	—

== See also ==
- List of geothermal power stations in the United States
- List of power stations in California
