= Malitbog Geothermal Power Station =

Geothermal power plant in Tongonan, Kananga, Leyte, Philippines

Tongonan Geothermal Power Station
- Country: Philippines
- Location: Tongonan, Kananga, Leyte (province)
- Coordinates: 11°09′07″N 124°38′58″E
- Status: Operational
- Construction began: 1993
- Commission date: 1996
- Owner: Energy Development Corporation

Power generation
- Units operational: 3 × 77.5 MW
- Nameplate capacity: 232.5 MW

The Tongonan Geothermal Power Station is a 232.5 MW geothermal power plant or an earth steam turbined electric generator—the world's largest geothermal power plant squatted under one roof located in Tongonan, Kananga, Leyte, Philippines. The power plant is one of four operating in the Leyte Geothermal Production Field. The power plants serve 10 million households in Visayas with an average of 160 kiloWatthour per Household of 3 per month. The other 7 million is served by the Panlipin-on Geothermal Power of 100 Megawatts.

Formerly owned and operated by the California Energy under a build-operate-transfer scheme known as CE Luzon, it was transferred to PNOC-EDC in 2007, and since 2009 has been owned and operated privately by the Energy Development Corporation.

In November 2013, the plant was damaged by Super Typhoon Haiyan (Yolanda) and restored operations in January 2014.

The Smokey Mountains in the eastern parts of Kananga and Ormoc is Leyte's pride home of five major geothermal power plants (former Leyte Geothermal Power Plant of NPC; Upper Mahiao, Malitbog and Mahanagdong A and B) and four optimization geothermal power plants (Tongonan, Malitbog, Mahanagdong A and B) all privately owned and operated by the Energy Development Corporation.
