= Stillwater Triple Hybrid Power Plant =

- Country: United States
- Location: Nevada
- Coordinates: 39.544°N 118.561°W

Solar farm
- Type: Standard PV

Power generation
- Nameplate capacity: 20 MW

The Stillwater GeoSolar Hybrid Plant is a combined 61 MW solar energy and geothermal power plant in the U.S. state of Nevada. Located 12 miles (19 km) NE of Fallon, near Stillwater, the site includes a 26MW solar photovoltaic plant and a 2MW solar thermal plant that were added to a 33MW geothermal plant.

== Overview ==
The project is a solar/geothermal plant and constructed by Enel Green Power. POWER Engineers Inc. provided detailed engineering services for the original binary geothermal plant as well as for the 2 MW Concentrating Solar Power (CSP) system. The total output of 15 GWh/month from the plant was sold to NV Energy. In summer, the PV plant produces more when the thermal plant is less efficient due to dry cooling in high temperatures.

== Geothermal plant ==
The plant entered into operation in 2001, and revitalized in 2009.

== Solar photovoltaic plant ==
Covering 240 acres (97 ha), the plant has 89,000 polycrystalline silicon solar panels and has a generation capacity of 26 MW. The photovoltaic generation was designed to make up for the reduction in output from the geothermal plant due to high ambient temperatures during summer midday hours.

== Solar thermal plant ==
An additional 2 MWe (17 MWth) using concentrated solar power (CSP) in parabolic troughs began construction in 2014. In addition to generating electricity, the CSP facility is expected to extend the life of the geothermal reservoir used for the geothermal portion of the facility. The CSP plant became operational in 2015.
