= Mill City, Mono County, California =

Mill City
- Former settlement
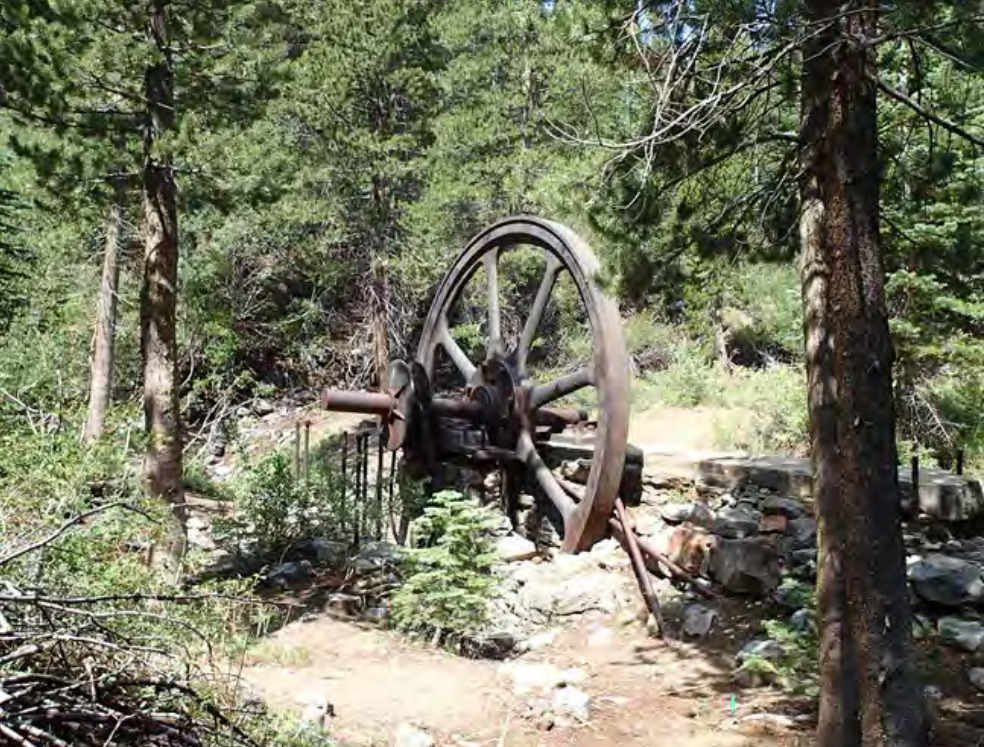
- Ruins of stamp mill flywheel

- Location in California
- Coordinates: 37°37′22″N 118°59′32″W
- Country: United States
- State: California
- County: Mono
- Elevation: 8,320 ft (2,536 m)

Mill City is a former settlement in Mono County, California, United States. It was located 8.5 miles (14 km) west-northwest of Mount Morrison and 0.5 miles (0.8 km) southwest of Old Mammoth, at an elevation of 8320 feet (2536 m).

Dominating the scene in Mill City are remains of Mammoth Mining Company’s 40-stamp mill, including a large flywheel and stone foundations. Other remains include sunken foundations of additional houses, found among pine trees on a hill above the mill site.

Mill City is currently on land owned by the United States Forest Service, who leased the land for recreational cabins. In 2012, tests found that water in Mammoth Creek was contaminated by mercury from the stamp mill. Mercury was used to separate gold from ore at the site, and it was not removed from the mine tailings. The Forest Service conducted a superfund investigation in 2016, and found that the risk to cabin owners from mercury, antimony, arsenic, and lead was high. Subsequent investigations found that the contamination had spread over 5 acres (2.0 ha). The cabin owners had to vacate their premises as of 2019. As of 2019, there were no Forest Service funds to remediate the site, while the previous owners (Union Bank) refused to pay for remediation. The Forest Service would only allow cabin owners back after remediation (or limit their exposure to five days/year). In 2022, the Forest Service revoked the permits for the cabins.
