= San Emidio Geothermal Plant =

Coordinates: 40.3693°N 119.4057°W

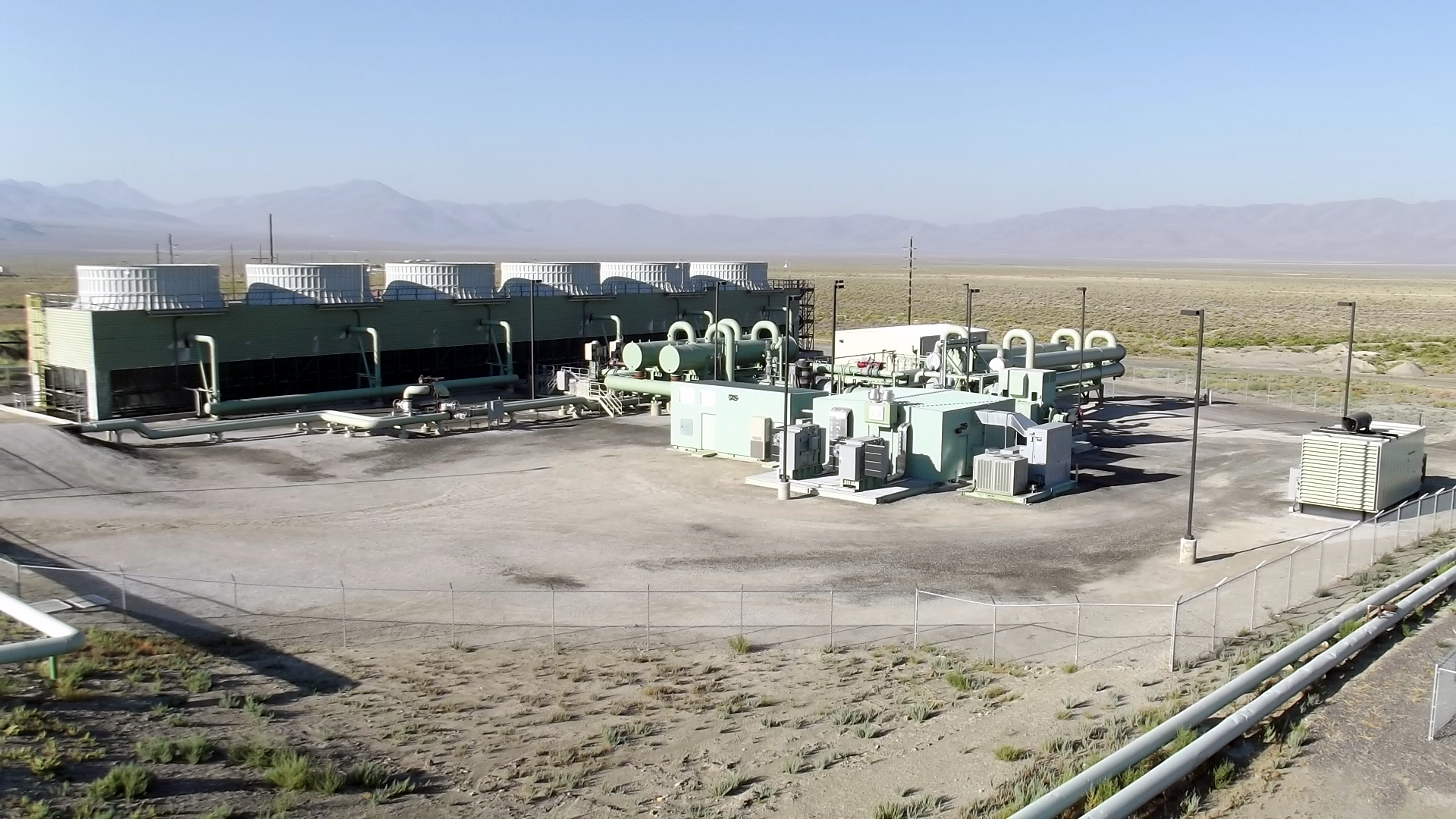
- Country: United States
- Location: Washoe County, Nevada
- Commission date: Empire Geothermal Plant: 1987; Phase 1 reconstruction: 2012
- Owner: U.S. Geothermal

Power generation
- Nameplate capacity: 11.8 MW
- Annual net output: 64,436 MWh (2018)

San Emidio Geothermal Plant, in Washoe County, Nevada, is a geothermal power plant with a design capacity of 11.8 megawatts (15,800 hp). The upgraded plant went online on May 25, 2012.

== History ==
The plant is the second to occupy the site. The older 3.6-megawatt (4,800 hp) plant, originally known as the Empire Geothermal Plant, which was sold by Empire Geothermal Power LLC to U.S. Geothermal Inc. in 2008, was commissioned in 1987. Phase I of the reconstruction added an 8.6-megawatt (11,500 hp) generator.

In January, 2020, the BLM initiated an environmental assessment concerning a possible new 40-megawatt (54,000 hp) power plant, substation, as many as 25 geothermal and injection wells, a 7.5 mile above ground pipeline and a 58 mile long power line terminating in Fernley, NV. The powerline will parallel an existing 500kV line and use existing access roads.

== Future expansions ==
- Phase II (Initially planned for 3Q 2013) (2020)
- Phase III with 17.2 megawatts (23,100 hp)
