= Energy Development Corporation =

Renewable energy company in the Philippines

- Company type: Public
- Traded as: PSE: EDC
- Industry: Energy
- Founded: 1976; 49 years ago
- Areas served: Luzon, Leyte, Negros
- Products: Renewable energy
- Parent: Lopez Holdings Corporation
- Website: www.energy.com.ph

Energy Development Corporation (or simply EDC) is a renewable energy company in the Philippines. It is involved in alternative energy projects, including geothermal, hydroelectric and wind energy projects.

The company was formerly owned by the Philippine National Oil Company (PNOC), a corporation owned by the Philippine government. EDC was privatized and acquired by the Lopez Group in 2007.

== History ==
The Energy Development Corporation (EDC) used to be a subsidiary of the state-owned Philippine National Oil Company (PNOC) established under Presidential Decree (PD) No. 334 on November 9, 1973 issued by President Ferdinand Marcos. EDC itself was established via PD No. 927 in 1976 to as the geothermal energy exploration and development arm of PNOC. It was established as a response to the oil embargo by the OPEC member-states following the Yom Kippur War.

The EDC commissioned the Tongonan and Palinpinon Geothermal Plants in 1983. In the 1990s, EDC commissioned the BacMan Geothermal Power Plant.

The privitazation of EDC began in the mid-2000s. In late 2006, the company had its initial public offering and was listed in the Philippine Stock Exchange. The First Philippine Holdings Corporation of the Lopez Group took over in 2007.

The privatized-EDC acquired the properties it developed from the national government. This includes the Tongonan and Palinpinon geothermal stations in 2009, and the BacMan station 2010. The BacMan Plant which was shut down in 2009 became fully operational again by 2014.

In 2012, EDC was granted Newen, a geothermal concession area in Chile, marking its expansion overseas.

== Affiliates ==
- First Gen Hydro Power Corp.

First Gen is the operator of the 132 megawatts Pantabangan Hydroelectric Powerplant and Masiway Hydroelectric Powerplant both in Pantabangan, Nueva Ecija.

- Green Core Geothermal, Inc.

Green Core is the operator of the 305 megawatts Tongonan and the Palinpinon geothermal plants in Leyte and Negros Oriental respectively.

== Powerplants ==
- Tongonan Geothermal Powerplant (operated by Green Core)
- Palinpinon Geothermal Powerplant (operated by Green Core)
- Pantabangan Hydroelectric Powerplant - 120 MW (operated by First Gen)
- Masiway Hydroelectric Powerplant - 12.5 MW (operated by First Gen)
- BacMan Geothermal Production Field (operated by EDC)
- Malitbog Geothermal Power Station
- Burgos Wind Farm
- Mount Apo Geothermal Power Plant
