= Ormat Technologies =

American renewable energy company

Ormat Technologies, Inc.

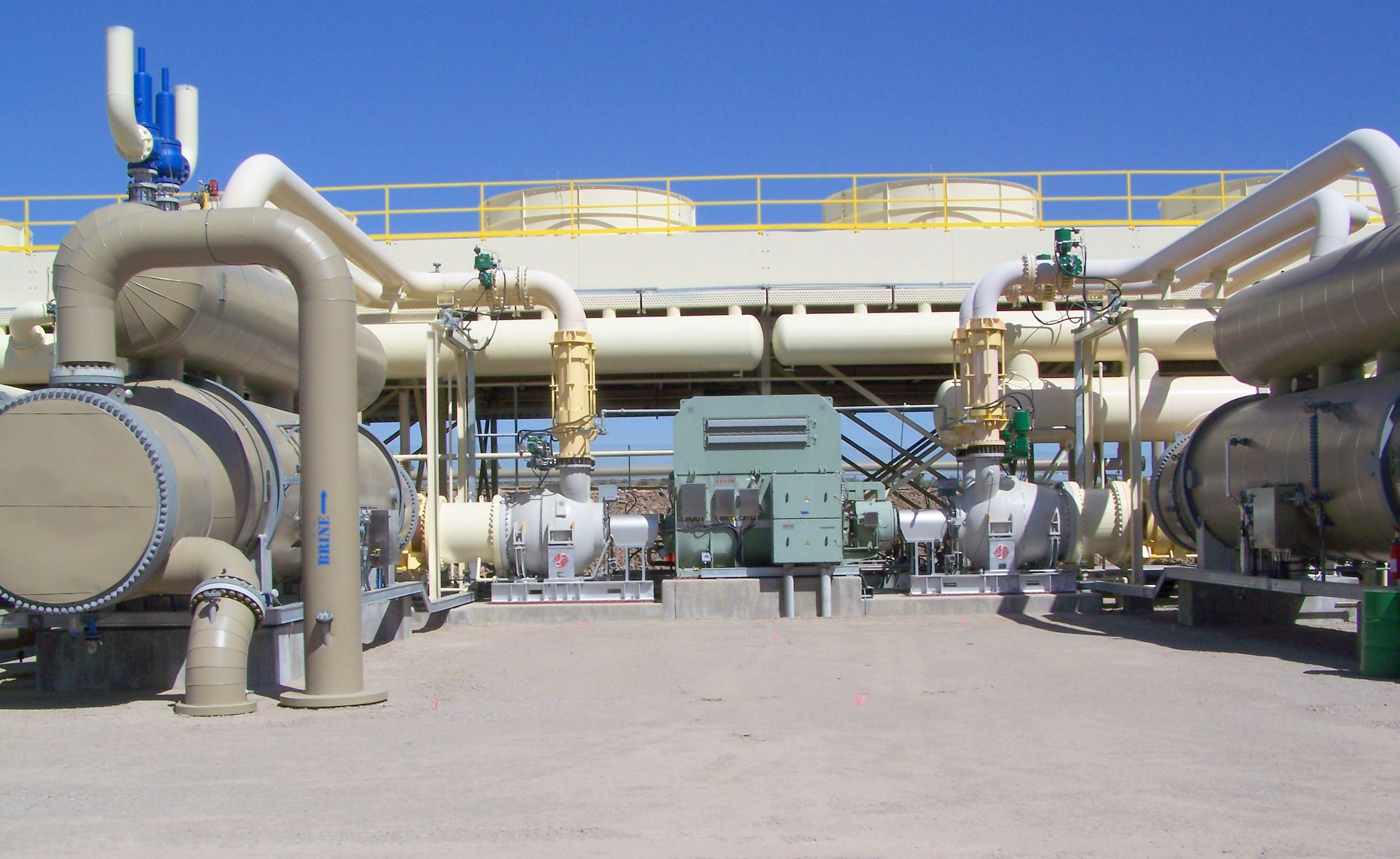
- An Ormat 20MW binary power plant at Steamboat, Nevada, USA.
- Type: Public
- Traded as: NYSE: ORA; S&P 400 component; TASE: ORA; TA-35 Index component
- ISIN: US6866881021
- Industry: Alternative energy; Renewable energy
- Founded: 1965; 61 years ago
- Founders: Lucien and Dita Bronicki
- Headquarters: Reno, Nevada, U.S.
- Key people: Doron Blachar (CEO)
- Products: Geothermal power; Energy recovery
- Revenue: US$703 million (2022)
- Operating income: US$175 million (2022)
- Net income: US$63 million (2022)
- Total assets: US$4.45 billion (2022)
- Total equity: US$1.97 billion (2022)
- Number of employees: 1,576 (December 31, 2023)
- Website: ormat.com

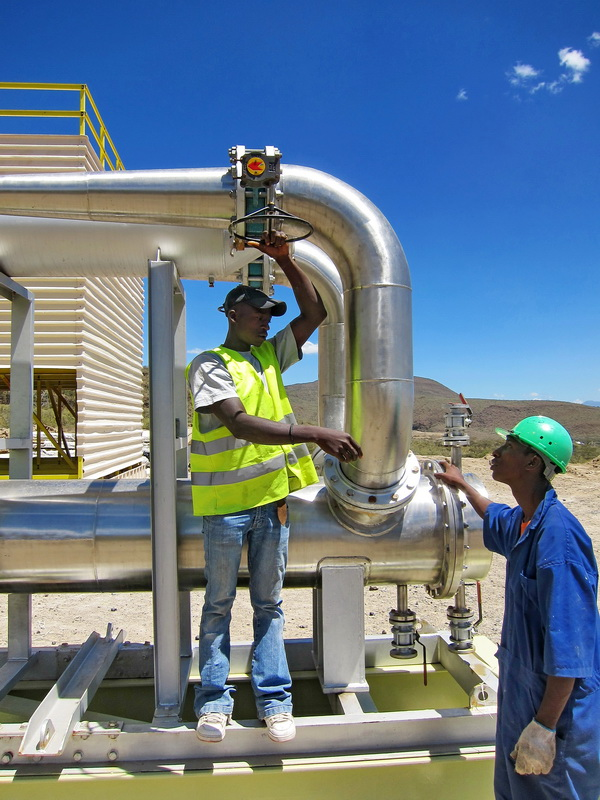
Worker at Ormat's Olkaria III Geothermal Power Station in Kenya

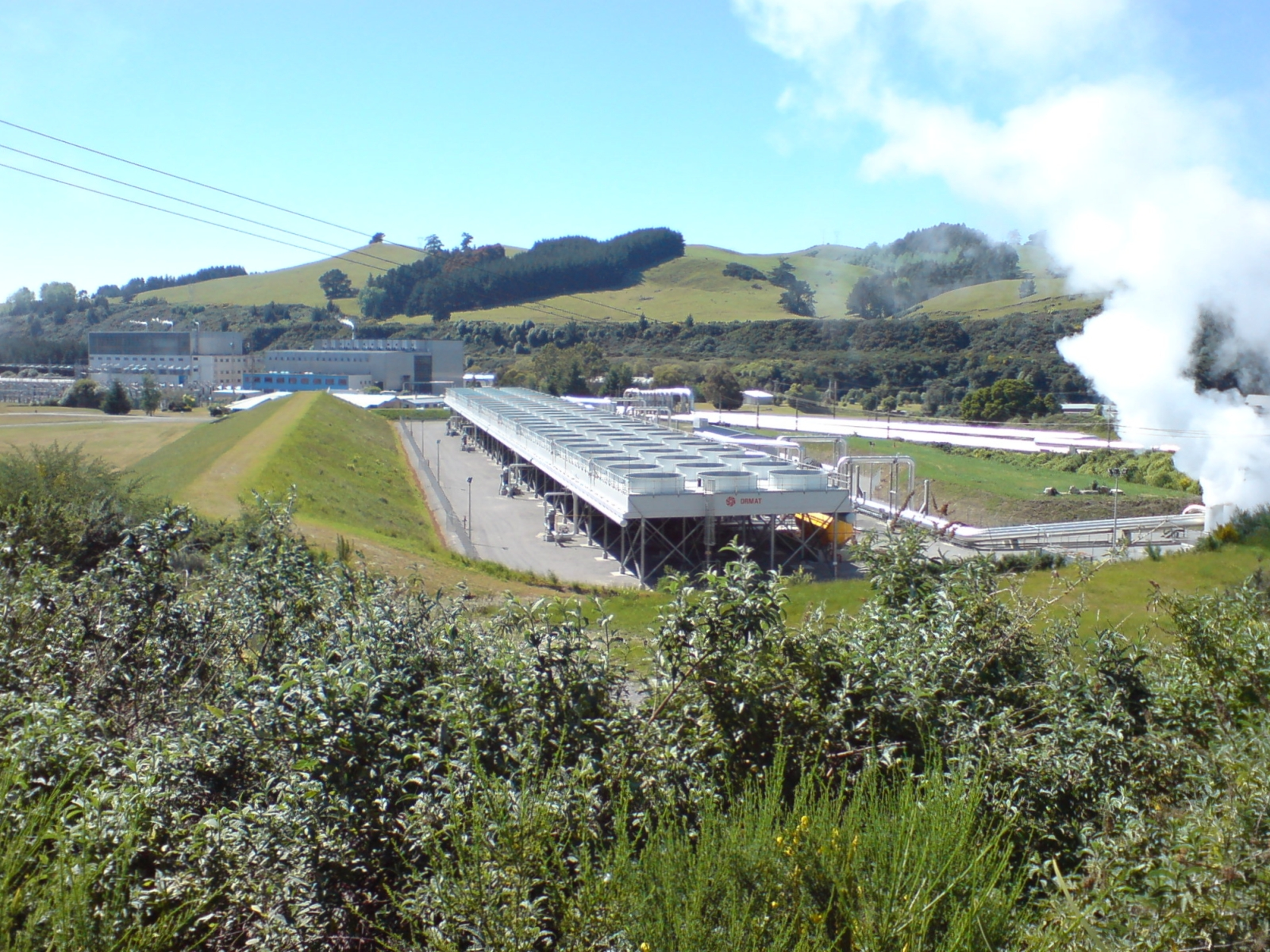
Wairakei Power Station in New Zealand, powered by Ormat equipment

Ormat Technologies, Inc. is an international company based in Reno, Nevada, United States. Ormat supplies alternative and renewable geothermal energy technology. The company has built over 190 power plants and installed over 3,200 MW of output. As of January 2021 it owns and operates 933 MW of geothermal and recovered energy based power plants. Ormat has supplied over 1000 turbochargers worldwide, in North America, South America, Europe, Australia, and Asia. The company's products also include turbines, generators, and heat exchangers.

The company's share is a dual stock traded on the Tel Aviv Stock Exchange since 1991 and on the New York Stock Exchange since 2004 under the symbol ORA, and is part of the Tel Aviv 35 Index and the Tel Aviv Tech-Elite Index. The company's main production facilities are located in Yavne, Israel.

== History ==
Ormat was established in 1965 as Ormat Turbines Ltd. (later renamed Ormat Industries), in Yavne, Israel, by engineer Lucien Bronicki, the company's chairman and CTO until 2014, and his wife Yehudit "Dita" Bronicki, who was CEO until 2014.

In the late 1950s Lucien Bronicki worked in a government physics laboratory, where he developed a turbine to produce electricity from a range of energy sources, including solar; the process is known as the organic Rankine cycle, which he co-developed with Harry Zvi Tabor. He retired from the lab to commercialize his ideas. In its early years the company focused exclusively on manufacturing power generation equipment.

The 1970s energy crisis increased interest in efficient generation technology. The firm obtained financial assistance from the Israeli government and raised capital from private investors to build one of the world's first solar-driven power stations. However the power station was not economically viable and was abandoned in 1988.

During the 1980s, the firm developed generation systems utilizing recovered energy, i.e. heat emitted during industrial processes. It also applied its technology to generate electricity from geothermal sources.

In 1986, the firm designed and supplied geothermal power systems to the Kawerau Power Station in New Zealand. Since then, it has built 13 geothermal power plants in that country. In 1989, the firm supplied geothermal equipment for the regional heating system at Sudurnes Iceland, utilizing the abundant local geothermal resources to provide heating for 20,000 people.

In the 1990s the firm decided not only to provide power generation equipment, but also to own and operate alternative and renewable energy power stations.

In 1991, the firm, then known as Ormat Industries, became listed on the Tel Aviv Stock Exchange. In 1992, Ormat acquired a controlling stake in Bet Shemesh Engines, a manufacturer of parts for jet engines, that also overhauls, maintains and assembles jet engines. In 2005, Ormat sold its shares in the company.

In 2004, Ormat Technologies completed an initial public offering on the New York Stock Exchange raising $100 million. Ormat Technologies was founded in 1994 as a US subsidiary of Ormat Industries. Following the initial public offering, Ormat Industries was restructured as a holding company that was still listed in the exchange, while shifting all its operations to the subsidiary Ormat Technologies.

In 2006, the firm received, for the first time, an order to supply equipment for the geothermal power plant in Landau, Germany.

In June 2014, Dita Bronicki resigned from her position as CEO and was appointed to the board of directors of Ormat Technologies. Dita Bronicki was elected as chairman of Ormat . The company selected Isaac Angel as CEO. Angel joined the company in April for an overlapping procedure and began as CEO in July 2014.

In November 2015, Dita and Yoram Bronicki resigned from the company's board of directors, and Gilon Beck was appointed chairman of the board.

As of May 2016, the FIMI fund and Bronicki Investment Fund were the company's largest shareholders, holding 14.83% and 7.23% of the company's shares, respectively. The rest of the company's shares are held by institutional bodies and by the public. In May 2017, the Japanese company Orix acquired the FIMI and Bronicki Investment Fund's share in Ormat for $627 million.

In July 2020, Doron Blachar, the company's former CFO since 2013, was appointed as the company's CEO, while Isaac Angel was appointed chairman of the board.

== Operations ==
The company owns and operates geothermal power plants in US, Guatemala, Kenya, Honduras and Guadeloupe.

== Technologies ==
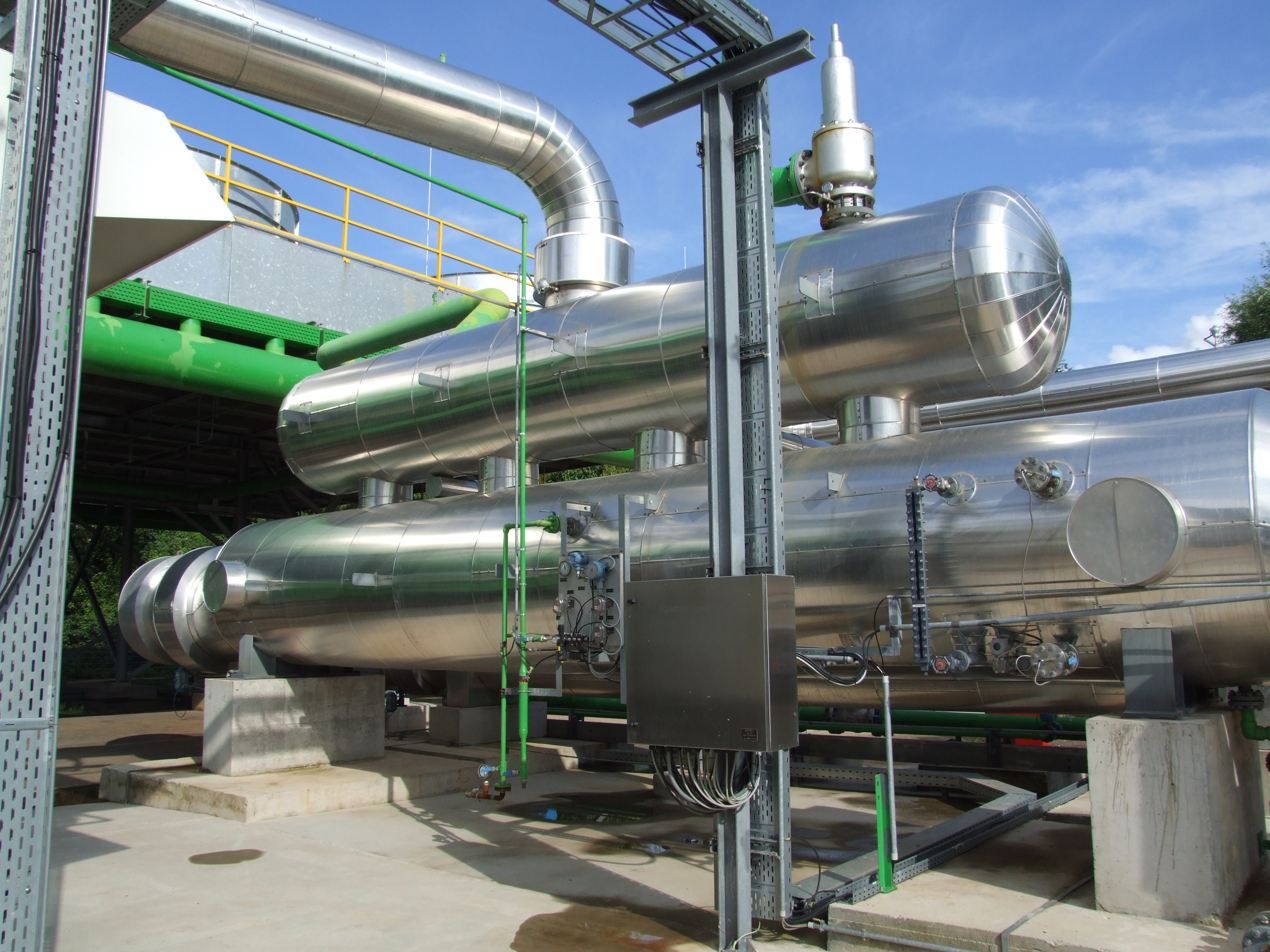
An Ormat Energy Converter (OEC) at a geothermal generation power plant, in Landau, Germany

=== Thermal energy ===
The firm's core technology is the Ormat Energy Converter power generation unit. It converts low and medium temperature heat into electrical energy, with low or zero emission of CO_{2} and pollutants. The main components are a vaporizer/preheater, turbo-generator, air-cooled or water-cooled condenser, feed pump and controls. The firm has installed more than 900 MW of geothermal and recovered energy generation (REG) power units, based on this technology.

The technology is optimized for use in geothermal energy generation, and the firm is the third largest geothermal producer in the United States. The technology is also suitable for recovered energy power generation, which converts waste heat from industrial processes into electricity that can be used on site or sold to power generation utilities. The firm's recovered energy technology was deployed in projects in Germany, Canada, India, USA, New Zealand and Japan.

=== Solar energy ===
In the 1980s Ormat built and operated one of the world's first power stations to produce electricity from solar energy, located just north of the Dead Sea in Israel. The plant utilized a solar pond, a large-scale solar thermal energy collector with integral heat storage. It was the largest operating solar pond ever built for electricity generation and operated until 1988. It had an area of 210,000 m^{2} and gave an electrical output of 5 MW.

After the decommissioning of the solar pond project, the firm was not active in the solar energy market until its entry into the Solar PV market.

=== Oil sands ===
Ormat's former parent company, Ormat Industries Ltd., developed an energy-efficient technology, OrCrude, for extracting crude oil from oil sands. The process is claimed to be more efficient than other technologies as it includes gasification, which substantially reduces the requirement for natural gas, typically the largest input cost in an in-situ oil sands project. The technology is used in the Long Lake project, a former joint venture between Nexen and OPTI Canada. In 2010, Ormat Industries sold all its holdings (5.1%) in OPTI Canada. In 2011, OPTI Canada was acquired by CNOOC Luxembourg S.à r.l, an indirect wholly owned subsidiary of CNOOC Limited.

== Spin offs ==
Ormat has been involved in the establishment and development of several companies:

Orbotech develops and manufactures automated optical inspection (AOI) systems for bare and assembled printed circuit boards and flat panel displays. The company's systems, imaging and computer-aided manufacturing technologies enable electronic manufacturers to achieve the increased yields and throughput essential for electronics production.

Orad Hi-Tec Systems Ltd. develops video and real-time image processing technologies for TV broadcasting, Internet, production studio and sports events.
