= Binary cycle =

Type of geothermal power station

A binary cycle is a method for generating electrical power from geothermal resources and employs two separate fluid cycles, hence binary cycle. The primary cycle extracts the geothermal energy from the reservoir, and secondary cycle converts the heat into work to drive the generator and generate electricity.

Binary cycles permit electricity generation even from low temperature geothermal resources (<180 °C) that would otherwise produce insufficient quantities of steam to make flash power plants economically viable. However, due to the lower temperatures binary cycles have low overall efficiencies of about 10–13%.

== Introduction ==
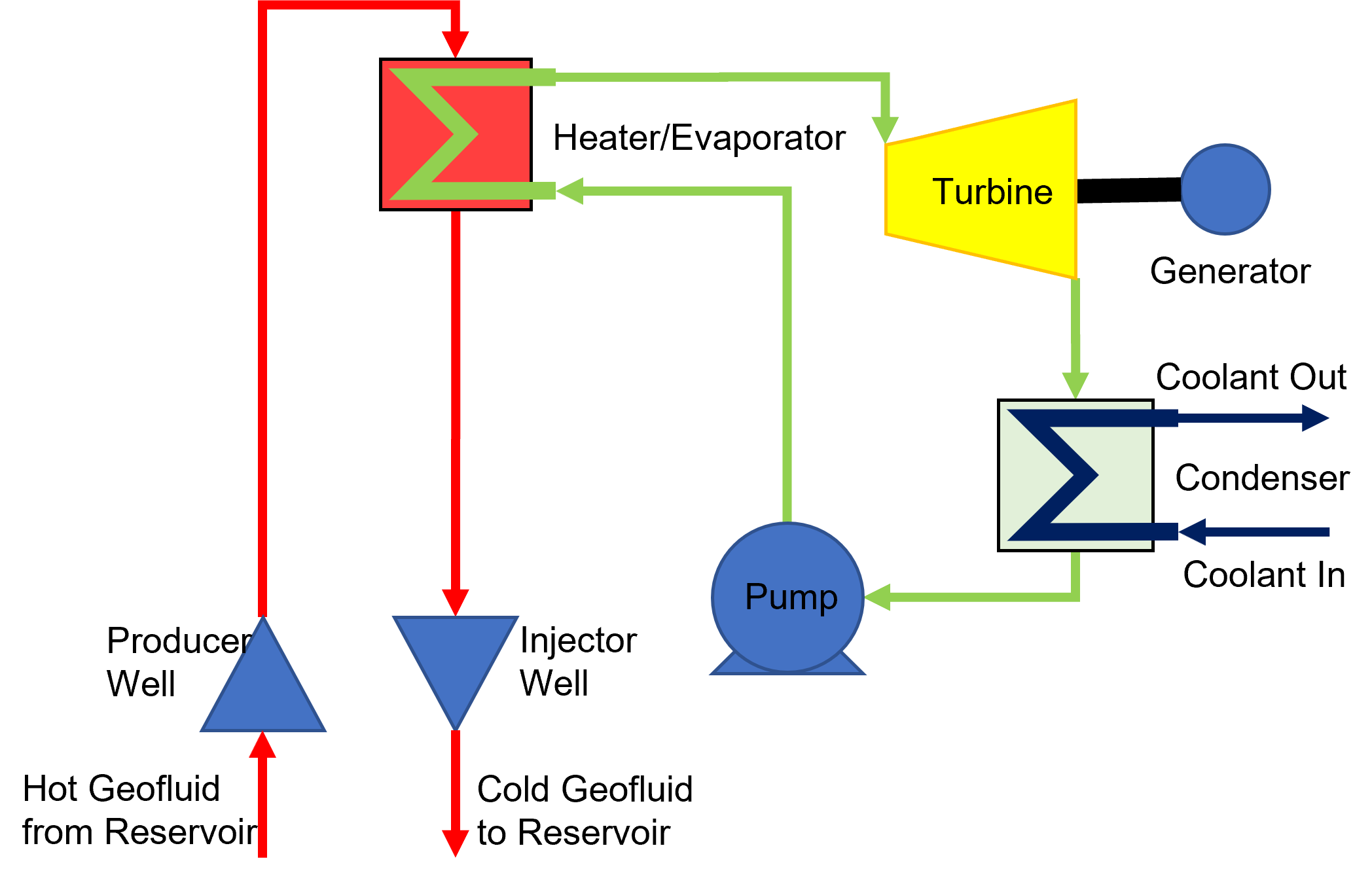
Process diagram of a binary cycle geothermal power plant Primary cycle – Geofluid Secondary cycle – Working fluid Coolant

In contrast to conventional geothermal power generation methods like dry-steam or flash, which use a single open cycle, a binary cycle has two separate cycles operating in tandem, hence binary cycle. The primary cycle extracts heat from the geothermal reservoir and provides this to the secondary cycle, which converts heat into work (see Heat engine) to drive a generator and produce electricity. Thermodynamically, binary cycle power plants are similar to coal-fired or nuclear power plants in that they employ Rankine power cycles, the main difference being the heat source and the choice of cycle working fluid.

=== Primary cycle ===
The geothermal reservoir's hot in-situ fluid (or geofluid) is produced to the surface via a wellbore, if necessary assisted by a pump. On the surface, the hot geofluid transfers some of its heat to the secondary cycle, via a heat exchanger, thus cooling in the process. The cold geofluid is then reinjected into the geothermal reservoir via a separate wellbore, where it is reheated. The primary cycle is considered an "open" cycle.

=== Secondary cycle ===
Cold high-pressure working fluid is heated and vapourised in a heat exchanger by the hot geofluid. The hot high-pressure vapour is expanded in a turbine before being cooled and condensed in a condenser. To close the loop, the cold low-pressure liquid is repressurised via a feed pump. The secondary cycle is a closed cycle.

The two main secondary cycle configurations are organic Rankine cycles (ORC) or Kalina cycles, the main difference being the choice of working fluid; an organic fluid (commonly a hydrocarbon or refrigerant) or a water-ammonia mixture respectively.

== History ==
The earliest example of a binary cycle geothermal power plant is thought to have been located on Ischia, Italy, between 1940 and 1943. The plant is thought to have used ethyl chloride as the working fluid at an effective capacity of 250 kW. However, owing to the Second World War taking place at the same time, not much is known about this particular installation.

Another binary cycle geothermal power plant was taken into operation in 1967 near Petropavlovsk on the Kamchatka peninsula, Russia. It was rated at 670 kW and ran for an unknown number of years, proving the concept of binary cycle geothermal power plants.

The first commercial-sized binary cycle geothermal plant was completed in 1979. The 11 MW design by J. Hilbert Anderson Inc. was implemented by Magma Power to harvest power from the hot water fields in East Mesa, Southern California.

As of December 2014, there were 203 binary cycle geothermal power plants across 15 countries worldwide, representing 35% of all geothermal power plants, but only generating 10.4% of total geothermal power (about 1250 MW).

== Variations ==
=== Dual pressure ===
The working fluid is evaporated at two different pressure levels, and thus temperatures. This improves efficiency by reducing exergetic losses in the primary heat exchanger by maintaining a closer match between the geofluid cooling curve and the working fluid heating curve.

=== Dual fluid ===
Two secondary cycles are operated in tandem, each with a separate working fluid and boiling point. This improves efficiency by reducing the exergetic losses of the heat introduction process, by ensuring a closer match between the geofluid cooling curve and the working fluids' heating curves.

== Performance ==
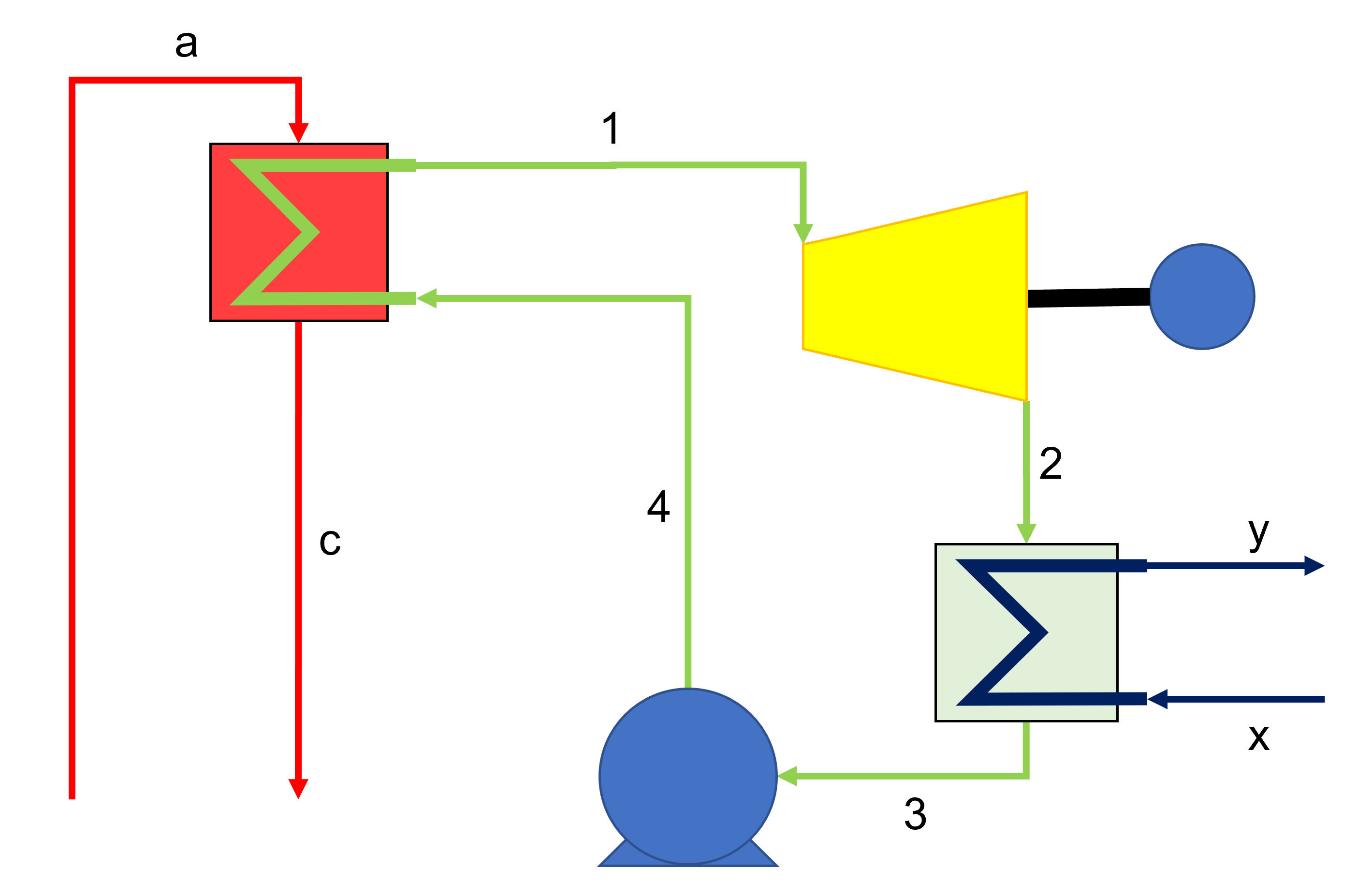
Schematic of a Binary Cycle. Streams a and c are geofluid. Streams 1, 2, 3 and 4 are working fluid. Streams x and y are coolant.

The performance of a simple binary cycle and its individual components can be calculated as follows:

=== Turbine ===
$\dot{W}_\text{turbine} = \dot{m}_\text{wf} * \eta_\text{turbine}*(h_1 - h_\text{2s})$

- $\dot{W}_\text{turbine}$ is the rate of work done by the turbine, in kW
- $\dot{m}_\text{wf}$ is the mass flow rate of working fluid, in kg/s
- $\eta_\text{turbine}$ is the turbine efficiency, non-dimensional
- $h_1$ is the specific enthalpy of the working fluid at the turbine inlet, in kJ/kg
- $h_\text{2s}$ is the specific enthalpy of the working fluid at the turbine outlet, assuming isentropic expansion in the turbine, in kJ/kg

=== Condenser ===
The equation below can be used to determine the condenser duty and mass flow rate of coolant required.

$$\dot{Q}_\text{condenser} = \dot{m}_\text{wf} *(h_2 - h_3) = \dot{m}_\text{coolant} *(h_y - h_x)$$

- $\dot{Q}_\text{condenser}$ is the rate of heat removed from the working fluid in the condenser, in kW
- $h_2$ and $h_3$ are the specific enthalpy of the working fluid at the condenser inlet and outlet respectively, in kJ/kg
- $\dot{m}_\text{coolant}$ is the mass flow rate of coolant, in kg/s
- $h_x$ and $h_y$ are the specific enthalpy of coolant at the condenser inlet and outlet respectively, in kJ/kg

=== Feed Pump ===
$$\dot{W}_\text{pump} = \dot{m}_\text{wf} * (h_\text{4s} - h_3)/\eta_\text{pump}$$

- $\dot{W}_\text{pump}$ is the rate of work done by the pump to repressurise the working fluid, in kW
- $h_\text{4s}$ is the specific enthalpy of the working fluid at the feed pump outlet, assuming isentropic compression, in kJ/kg
- $h_3$ is the specific enthalpy of the working fluid at the feed pump inlet, in kJ/kg
- $\eta_\text{pump}$ is the pump efficiency, non-dimensional

=== Primary Heat Exchanger ===
The equation below can be used to determine the primary heat exchanger duty and mass flow rate of geofluid required.

$$\dot{Q}_\text{PHX} = \dot{m}_\text{wf} *(h_1 - h_4) = \dot{m}_\text{geofluid} *(h_a - h_c)$$

- $\dot{Q}_\text{PHX}$ is the rate of heat added to the working fluid within the primary heat exchanger, kW
- $h_4$ is the specific enthalpy of the working fluid at the primary heat exchanger inlet, in kJ/kg
- $\dot{m}_\text{geofluid}$ is the mass flow rate of geofluid, in kg/s
- $h_a$ and $h_c$ are the specific enthalpy of the geofluid at the primary heat exchanger inlet and outlet respectively, in kJ/kg

== Efficiency ==
There are a number of different definitions of efficiency that may be considered; these are discussed below.

=== First law efficiency ===
The first law efficiency (from the first law of thermodynamics) is a measure of the conversion of the heat provided to the cycle into useful work. When accounting for real life losses and inefficiencies, real binary cycle geothermal plants have a first law efficiency of between 10 and 13%.

$$\eta_\text{I}^\text{th} = \frac{\dot{W}_\text{net}}{\dot{Q}_\text{PHE}} = \frac{\dot{W}_\text{turbine}-\dot{W}_\text{pump}}{\dot{Q}_\text{PHE}}$$

==== Carnot efficiency ====
The Carnot efficiency gives the efficiency of an ideal thermodynamic cycle, operating between two reservoirs of different temperatures, as such it provides a theoretical maximum to the efficiency of any heat engine. For this reason, a geothermal power plant producing hot geofluid at 180 °C (≈450 K) and rejecting heat at 25 °C (≈298 K) has a maximum efficiency of just 34%.

$$\eta_\text{Carnot} = 1-\frac{T_C}{T_H}$$

- $T_C$ and $T_H$ are the hot and cold absolute temperature respectively, in K

=== Second law efficiency ===
The second law efficiency (from the second law of thermodynamics) is a measure of the utilisation of the ideally maximum work available and conversion into useful work.

$\eta_\text{II}^\text{util} = \frac{\dot{W}_\text{net}}{\dot{E}_\text{geofluid}} = \frac{\dot{W}_\text{turbine}-\dot{W}_\text{pump}}{\dot{m}_\text{geofluid}*[(h_a - h_0)-T_0*(s_a-s_0)]}$
- $\dot{E}_\text{geofluid}$ is the exergy rate of geofluid, in kW.
- $h_0$, $s_0$ and $T_0$ are the specific enthalpy, in kJ/kg, the specific entropy, in kJ/kg/K and the absolute temperature, in K, of the geofluid at the local reference condition. This could be local ambient, wet-bulb or reinjection conditions.

== Working fluid selection ==
The working fluid plays a pivotal role in any binary cycle and must be selected with care. Some criteria for selecting a suitable fluid are given below.

1. A critical temperature and pressure above the cycle maximum temperature and pressure – most of the heat is transferred at the maximum temperature, increasing efficiency.
2. A saturation dome that resembles an inverted U – this prevents liquid drop out in the turbine, which reduces efficiency, damages the turbine blades and thus reduces the turbine's lifetime.
3. High thermal conductivity – improves the heat transfer in the primary heat exchanger and the condenser, reducing the total heat transfer area required and therefore cost of the plant.
4. Environmental compatibility – non-toxic, non-carcinogenic, low global warming potential, low ozone depletion potential, non-flammable, chemically inert.
5. Low cost and readily available.

== Power plants ==
There are numerous binary cycle power stations in commercial production.

=== Organic Rankine cycle ===
- Olkaria III, Kenya
- Mammoth Lakes, California, United States
- Steamboat Springs (Nevada), United States
- Te Huka Power Station, New Zealand
- Kirchstockach (Munich), Germany
- Traunreut, Germany

=== Kalina cycle ===
- Husavik Power station
- Geothermie Unterhaching

== See also ==
- Geothermal electricity
- Working fluid
- Organic Rankine cycle
- Kalina cycle
