= Ely Energy Center =

- Country: United States
- Location: Steptoe Valley, White Pine County, Nevada
- Coordinates: 39.511°N 114.794°W
- Status: Mothballed
- Construction began: Initially scheduled for 2007
- Construction cost: $5 billion (2008 estimate)
- Owner: Sierra Pacific Resources

The Ely Energy Center was a proposed coal-fired power plant that was to be built in Steptoe Valley, north of the city of Ely and located in White Pine County, Nevada. The plant was proposed by Nevada Power Company and Sierra Pacific Resources in January 2006. Construction was to begin on a 750-megawatt power unit in 2007, with completion by 2011. A second 750-megawatt unit was to be built within a few years after the first one, with a total cost of $3.8 billion. The companies also planned to ultimately add two 500-megawatt coal gasification plants to the project as soon as such technology became commercially viable. The total cost, upon full completion, would amount to $5 billion. The Ely Energy Center would have been the largest power plant in Nevada, and the state's largest energy project since the construction of Hoover Dam.

The project faced opposition from environmental groups and senator Harry Reid, but was supported by Nevada governor Jim Gibbons, the Ely Shoshone Tribe, and some Ely city officials. The project was postponed for three and a half years in November 2007, due to delays from the Bureau of Land Management (BLM) in issuing an environmental impact statement (EIS). In February 2009, the project was delayed for approximately 10 years, until the technology to capture and store carbon dioxide pollution would become commercially feasible. The decision was made due to the possibility of the United States Congress enacting carbon emission tax laws, which would increase the project's cost and make it unfeasible. Rising construction costs were also a factor in delaying the project.

== History ==
=== Announcement and overview ===
On January 10, 2006, utility company Sierra Pacific Resources – the parent company of Nevada Power Company – announced plans to construct the Ely Energy Center, a $5 billion coal plant, in White Pine County's Steptoe Valley, north of the city of Ely. The project was to be built on land that was controlled by the Bureau of Land Management (BLM). The project was part of the company's plan to lower its reliance on natural gas. The Ely Energy Center would be the largest power plant in the state, and the largest energy project in the state since the construction of Hoover Dam.

The first power unit, capable of producing 750 megawatts, was to be operational by 2011. A 250-mile transmission line would accompany the energy center, to bring electricity from the plant to northern and southern Nevada. A second 750-megawatt plant would be completed within a few years after the first one. Both units, to be built at a total cost of $3 billion, were to utilize water-conserving technology and "supercritical" technology capable of burning coal efficiently at high temperatures. The company would also use clean coal technology as a way of minimizing environmental effects, while hybrid cooling would be used to reduce the amount of water required to keep the plants cool. Additionally, the company had plans to ultimately build two 500-megawatt coal gasification plants at the Ely Energy Center, as soon as such technology became commercially viable. The gasification plants would cost $2 billion to construct. The four plants would be capable of producing up to 2,500 megawatts, enough to provide electricity to 1.7 million households.

Sierra Pacific Resources had previously declined to be a long-term customer of LS Power's White Pine Energy Station (also proposed for the Steptoe Valley) and Sithe Global's Toquop Energy Project (proposed near Mesquite, Nevada) as bond rating agencies perceive long-term power contracts to be a liability for utility companies, while company-owned plants are treated as assets. Sierra Pacific Resources planned to finance the project through stocks and bonds. Construction was expected to begin in 2007. The project would provide up to 2,000 construction jobs, and 300 permanent jobs upon completion. Sierra Pacific Resources stated that the project could make the company an additional $90 million in its first year. Officials of Utah's Hill Air Force Base had concerns that the coal plant could interfere with training flights in the Ely area. The project was presented to the White Pine County Commission on March 8, 2006. In May 2006, LS Power stated that consumers of electrical power in Nevada would save $600 million over a three-year period if Nevada Power Company and Sierra Pacific Power would purchase power from the White Pine Energy Station rather than building their own coal plant.

=== Progress ===
In September 2006, environmental groups testified that the companies should delay the Ely Energy Center for a year to conduct further research, as the current version of the plant would produce large amounts of carbon dioxide. In November 2006, the Public Utilities Commission gave the companies permission to spend $300 million to begin developing the transmission line and the $3.7 billion Ely Energy Center. Nevada Power Company was to pay 80 percent of the cost for the 1,500-megawatt energy center, while Sierra Pacific Resources would pay the remainder. Later that month, the companies applied for an air permit with the Nevada Division of Environmental Protection.

In March 2007, Sierra Pacific Resources agreed to help the city of Ely purchase the Nevada Northern Railway by providing a $375,000 loan. The company intended to use the railroad to transport coal to the energy center from Montana and from Wyoming's Powder River Basin. The company planned to spend $40 million of a $3.8 billion budget to rebuild 100 miles of the railway so it could connect with an existing Union Pacific rail line. LS Power, which also helped cover the cost to purchase the railway, also planned to use it for transporting coal to its White Pine Energy Station.

By April 2007, analysts believed that only one coal plant would be built in White Pine County, with the Ely Energy Center being considered as more likely to proceed. In June 2007, a spokesman for the companies said they did not expect to receive opposition from the National Park Service, which had recently voiced opposition to the White Pine Energy Station for its possible environmental effects on the nearby Great Basin National Park. David Sims, project director of development for the Ely Energy Center, said the project would use superior air quality controls that would result in significantly lower sulfur dioxide emissions compared to the White Pine Energy Station.

=== Environmental opposition and delay ===
In July 2007, Harry Reid said he would fight the development of the two coal projects. Ely city officials expressed disappointment with Reid's position. Nevada governor Jim Gibbons, a supporter of the two coal plants, reaffirmed his support for the projects after Reid's comment. At the end of the month, seven groups submitted a petition to the Nevada Environmental Commission requesting that permits for the two coal plants be delayed until the commission enacted new limits on the amount of pollution allowed by such plants. A hearing on the matter was set for September 7, 2007.

On November 28, 2007, Nevada Power announced that the project would be delayed for three and a half years because of regulatory review, while Sierra Pacific Resources planned to build a new natural gas-fired power plant near Las Vegas to keep up with demand in southern Nevada. Sierra Pacific Resources attributed the delay to the BLM, which had yet to issue an environmental impact statement (EIS). The BLM had expected to issue the EIS by summer 2008, but no longer expected to meet the deadline as it was also busy reviewing other projects. The company no longer expected to complete the first 750-megawatt unit by 2011, and did not set a new deadline for its completion. Reid praised the decision to delay construction of the project.

In January 2008, the National Park Service stated that plans to build the energy center near Ely were "unacceptable" as it would harm the quality of the air and water at Great Basin National Park, as well as disrupt scenic views. That month, the Ely Shoshone Tribe announced support for both coal plants, considering them to be an economic necessity. In February 2008, the companies were expected to delay their application for the project for two years.

In May 2008, the National Parks Conservation Association stated that the two coal plants would cause Great Basin National Park to suffer from acid rain pollution over time, ultimately harming the park's plants, fish, and other wildlife. The association also stated that the coal plants would affect air quality at the nearby Zion National Park in Utah. In August 2008, analysts for an environmental group, as well as the Public Utilities Commission staff and the attorney general's Bureau of Consumer Protection, recommended that Nevada Power and Sierra Pacific Resources end development of the project, which had increased in cost from $3.8 billion to $5 billion. In September 2008, the attorney general and Nevadans for a Clean, Affordable, Reliable Energy, an environmental group, believed that Nevada Power should do a complete review of project and study other possible power alternatives. Nevada Power suggested waiting until 2010 to do a full study, as new laws regarding carbon dioxide pollution were expected to be enacted by then.

In November 2008, Reid requested that Gibbons "join with me in putting Nevada quickly on a cleaner plat toward a renewable energy and efficiency driven economy and safer future." In December 2008, the BLM issued a draft EIS for the project, while NV Energy suspected that a final decision from the BLM was another year away. The project was also still awaiting a final air permit from the Nevada Division of Environmental Protection. The first power unit was expected to become operational by 2015, followed by the second unit a year later.

On February 3, 2009, NV Energy chief executive officer Michael Yackira said the project "is going to be very difficult to build." On February 9, 2009, NV Energy announced that the project would be postponed for approximately 10 years, until the technology to capture and store carbon dioxide pollution would become commercially feasible. Yackira said the decision was due to rising construction costs and the possibility of the United States Congress enacting carbon emission tax laws, which would increase the project's cost and make it unfeasible. The company planned to continue building the One Nevada transmission line, which was expected to be operational by late 2012 but became operational in 2014. Reid said, "I applaud NV Energy's decision to speed up the development of an important transmission line and to postpone construction of its Ely Energy Center coal plant." A July 2009 report from the Government Accountability Office confirmed that air quality and visibility at Great Basin National Park would be affected if either of the coal plants were built.
