= White Pine Energy Station =

Proposed coal-fired power plant in Nevada, US

- Country: United States
- Location: Steptoe Valley, White Pine County, Nevada
- Coordinates: 39.729695°N 114.775508°W
- Status: Mothballed
- Construction began: Initially scheduled for 2006
- Construction cost: $1 billion to $3 billion (2007 estimate)
- Owners: White Pine Energy Associates, LLC

The White Pine Energy Station was a proposed coal-fired power plant that was to be built in White Pine County, Nevada. The plant was to be built in the county's Steptoe Valley, and would be located 34 miles north of the city of Ely. White Pine Energy Associates, LLC, a subsidiary of LS Power, announced the project in February 2004, with plans to begin construction in 2006, with the possibility of having it operational in 2010. The 1,590-megawatt project would consist of three units, each producing 530 megawatts.

The project went through several delays and faced opposition from senator Harry Reid, as well as concerned environmental groups and the National Park Service, which believed that the plant would diminish air quality and affect the wildlife at the nearby Great Basin National Park. Supporters of the project included Nevada governor Jim Gibbons, the Ely Shoshone Tribe, and some Ely city officials. LS Power postponed the project indefinitely in March 2009, due to a declining economy and increasing uncertainty regarding regulations.

== History ==
=== Announcement and overview ===
The White Pine Energy Station was announced in February 2004, and was proposed by White Pine Energy Associates, LLC, a privately held subsidiary of LS Power. The company had previously developed nine natural-gas fired power plants. The new project would be a coal-fired power generation station, initially with the ability to produce 500 to 800 megawatts of capacity, with the potential to be expanded to 1,600 megawatts. Construction was scheduled to begin in 2006, with the possibility of the project being operational in 2010. Approximately 600 construction workers were expected to work on the project, and 100 workers would be employed at the station upon its completion. The project would be built at a cost of $600 million to $1 billion.

The project was to be built in White Pine County, Nevada, north of the Ely area. Permits and approval for the project had not yet been obtained at the time of the announcement, as several sites north of Ely were still being considered. The Ely area had been chosen after a statewide search. The company liked Ely for its "progressive attitude," as well as the availability of water for cooling the coal-powered plant. Upon initially being proposed, the project was to use up to 8 billion U.S. gallons (30 million cubic meters) of groundwater each year. The close proximity of transmission lines was also considered beneficial. Also taken into consideration were plans by the city of Ely to own and operate the Nevada Northern Railway, as the plant would need a way to receive low-sulfur coal from Wyoming's Powder River Basin. LS Power ultimately helped the city of Ely to purchase the railroad line by providing a payment.

Development director Lawrence Willick said White Pine County officials were enthusiastic about the power plant, saying, "Their economy has been so dependent on mining and the ups and downs of mining." Willick noted the potential for the plant to be linked to Sierra Pacific Power Company's nearby transmission grid, allowing the plant to serve utilities and cooperatives in northern Nevada and Utah, although discussions had not yet been held with Sierra Pacific Power. Beginning in June 2004, project manager Eric W. Crawford spent five weeks meeting with numerous agencies, people, and politicians to progress the project.

=== Site location and project permits ===
Several factors were taken into consideration when choosing a suitable site for the plant. In July 2004, LS Power chose a 1,300-acre (530 ha) site for the plant, located 21 miles north of McGill, Nevada, near Cherry Creek. The chosen site was located 34 miles north of Ely, in Steptoe Valley. A possible alternate site was also chosen for the project. Environmental impact statements (EIS) were underway in August 2004, after LS Power hired CH2M Hill as the main contractor, with EDAW as a subcontractor. The plant was estimated, by the Nevada State Commission on Economic Development, to generate over $100 million in tax revenue during construction and the first six years of its operation.

In December 2004, Crawford said the power plant was on schedule as the company was preparing the EIS and focusing on obtaining right-of-ways from the Bureau of Land Management (BLM). The EIS was still being worked on in March 2005, while LS Power remained focused on the same site despite concerns about air quality being affected by the plant. In April 2005, Crawford said construction could cost up to $2 billion, depending on the size of the project. Construction was to begin in phases beginning in 2006, with the first phase possibly operational by 2010. Up to 1,200 construction workers would be employed on the project, which would ultimately employ between 100 and 130 plant workers. LS Power said it would begin construction only after wholesale customers signed long-term contracts to buy the power generated by the plant.

In May 2005, the Ely City Council unanimously approved a resolution to support the project. The project's construction schedule remained on track as of June 2005, with permits, approvals, and project agreements expected to be obtained the following year. In August 2005, Crawford said state permit applications would be filed within several months, while work on the EIS was also ongoing. In December 2005, LS Power filed for an air permit with the Nevada Department of Environmental Protection, as it was required for the plant. The BLM was expected to release an EIS for the power plant in 2006.

In January 2006, Crawford said the project would proceed despite the recent announcement of another coal plant, the Ely Energy Center, proposed by Sierra Pacific Resources. By May 2006, the White Pine Energy Station was expected to cost $3 billion. That month, LS Power stated that consumers of electrical power in Nevada would save $600 million over a three-year period if Nevada Power Company and its affiliate, Sierra Pacific Power, would purchase power from the White Pine Energy Station rather than building their own coal plant; the two companies rejected LS Power's proposal. In July 2006, LS Power expected to have permits for the plant by early 2007. In October 2006, LS Power announced a joint venture with energy producer Dynegy to combine the two companies. LS Power acquired 40 percent of Dynegy in early 2007.

=== Environmental concerns ===
In March 2007, the United States Environmental Protection Agency (EPA) stated that LS Power should provide additional documentation about technology the company planned to use to reduce sulfur dioxide emissions. The EPA also requested further analysis of the proposed plant's effect on visibility. By April 2007, analysts believed that only one coal plant would be built in the county, with the Ely Energy Center being considered as more likely to proceed.

By May 2007, after receiving public comments on the project, LS Power had reduced the amount of water the proposed plant would use, from 25,000 acre-feet to 5,000 acre-feet. The reduction was made possible with the utilization of a hybrid cooling system. That month, in response to LS Power's application for an air quality permit, the National Park Service warned state environmental officials that the power plant would hamper views and kill trout at the nearby Great Basin National Park, located 60 miles southeast of the proposed plant. The National Park Service stated that LS Power should "assume a burden of protecting the resources in that park from the effects of its operations. That may mean 'going the extra mile' to employ advanced ... pollution control technology. If (the builder) is not willing to do so, it should consider an alternate location." Crawford said, "This will be one of the cleanest coal plants in the country. The community is very supportive and actually desires a project like this in (the) region."

One of the National Park Service's primary concerns was LS Power's intention to use dry scrubbers at the plant to reduce sulfur dioxide pollution rather than wet scrubbers, which are preferred by the park service. Crawford said dry scrubbers were more advantageous. Another concern was that acid rain could destroy the park's limestone caves. Crawford hoped for construction to begin in 2008, after the regulatory process was expected to be completed. By that time, the plant was to consist of three units, each one producing 530 megawatts. In June 2007, the EPA wrote to the BLM that its draft EIS for the proposed project was lacking information that would help the EPA fully determine the impacts that the plant would have on the nearby area.

In July 2007, senator Harry Reid said he would fight the development of the two coal projects. Ely city officials expressed disappointment with Reid's position. Nevada governor Jim Gibbons, a supporter of the two coal plants, reaffirmed his support for the projects after Reid's comment. At the end of the month, seven groups submitted a petition to the Nevada Environmental Commission requesting that permits for the two coal plants be delayed until the commission enacted new limits on the amount of pollution allowed by such plants. A hearing on the matter was set for September 7, 2007. In August 2007, the BLM was revising the project's EIS. At the time, Crawford said the project did not yet have a customer to purchase the power that would be generated by the 1,590-megawatt plant, which would provide enough power for nearly 1.2 million households. Crawford said the power would be sold to "investor-owned utilities, rural electric cooperatives and municipal electric utilities."

In September 2007, Dynegy was among five companies that received subpoenas from New York Attorney General Andrew Cuomo, who stated that Dynegy failed to disclose risks involved in the development of coal-fired plants, including the White Pine Energy Station. By November 2007, construction costs for a scaled-down version of the plant had increased from an estimated $600 million to more than $1 billion, while the facility in its fully developed form could cost over $3 billion.

In December 2007, LS Power was awaiting final approval of a draft air permit, which was delayed while the EPA reviewed concerns from an environmental group about the project threatening endangered species. EPA spokesman Dante Pistone said, "It involves a question about the impact (of additional carbon dioxide) on coral in the Gulf of Mexico." In January 2008, the Ely Shoshone Tribe announced support for both coal plants, considering them to be an economic necessity. In February 2008, LS Power offered to compensate White Pine County for the amount of water it would use for the plant.

In May 2008, the National Parks Conservation Association stated that the two coal plants would cause Great Basin National Park to suffer from acid rain pollution over time, ultimately harming the park's plants, fish, and other wildlife. The association also stated that the coal plants would affect air quality at the nearby Zion National Park in Utah.

=== Further developments and postponement ===
In August 2008, the BLM approved LS Power to build a transmission line that would connect electrical grids located in northern and southern Nevada. The transmission line would carry power from the White Pine Energy Station to Las Vegas, although LS Power planned to build the transmission line regardless of whether the coal plant got built.

The BLM's final EIS, originally expected to be released in August 2008, was instead released that October. LS Power had yet to receive a final air permit, as the EPA was busy determining whether the plant complied with the Endangered Species Act. LS Power stated that construction of the first 720-megawatt phase of the project could begin in late 2009, as long as the company received the air permit and other necessary government approvals. As of November 2008, LS Power was awaiting a record of decision from the BLM and a final permit from the Nevada Division of Environmental Protection. Later that month, Reid requested that Gibbons "join with me in putting Nevada quickly on a cleaner plat toward a renewable energy and efficiency driven economy and safer future."

On December 17, 2008, Dynegy denied that the White Pine Energy Station was in jeopardy after an earlier report stated that the company was reevaluating its development of new power plants. On December 22, 2008, the BLM approved the project to be built on the land. However, Mark Milburn, director of project development at LS Power, expected the decision to be appealed by environmental groups. Jon Summers, spokesman for Reid, said, "LS Power would be wiser and more helpful to its own investors to withdraw the proposal to build an enormous coal plant to import millions of tons of coal, pollute Nevada's skies and sell its power to other states, and instead focus on developing clean renewable power in our state as rapidly as possible."

On January 2, 2009, Dynegy and LS Power announced the end of their partnership in developing the White Pine Energy Station, as well as other new projects, including the proposed transmission line, known as the Southwest Intertie Project. LS Power planned to continue both projects, of which they would have full ownership and development rights. Milburn expected the project to receive a final air permit early in the year, as well as approval from the Public Utilities Commission by April 2009. On January 21, 2009, environmental groups filed an appeal of the BLM's approval of the project. On February 27, 2009, after the Ely Energy Center was indefinitely delayed, Milburn said the White Pine Energy Station was "moving full speed ahead", stating, "We're at the final steps."

On March 5, 2009, LS Power announced that it was indefinitely postponing construction on the White Pine Energy Station due to a declining economy and increasing uncertainty regarding regulations. Reaction from local residents to the postponement was mixed. A July 2009 report from the Government Accountability Office confirmed that air quality and visibility at Great Basin National Park would be affected if either of the coal plants were built.
