= Reid Gardner Battery Energy Storage System =

Battery storage power station in Clark County, Nevada

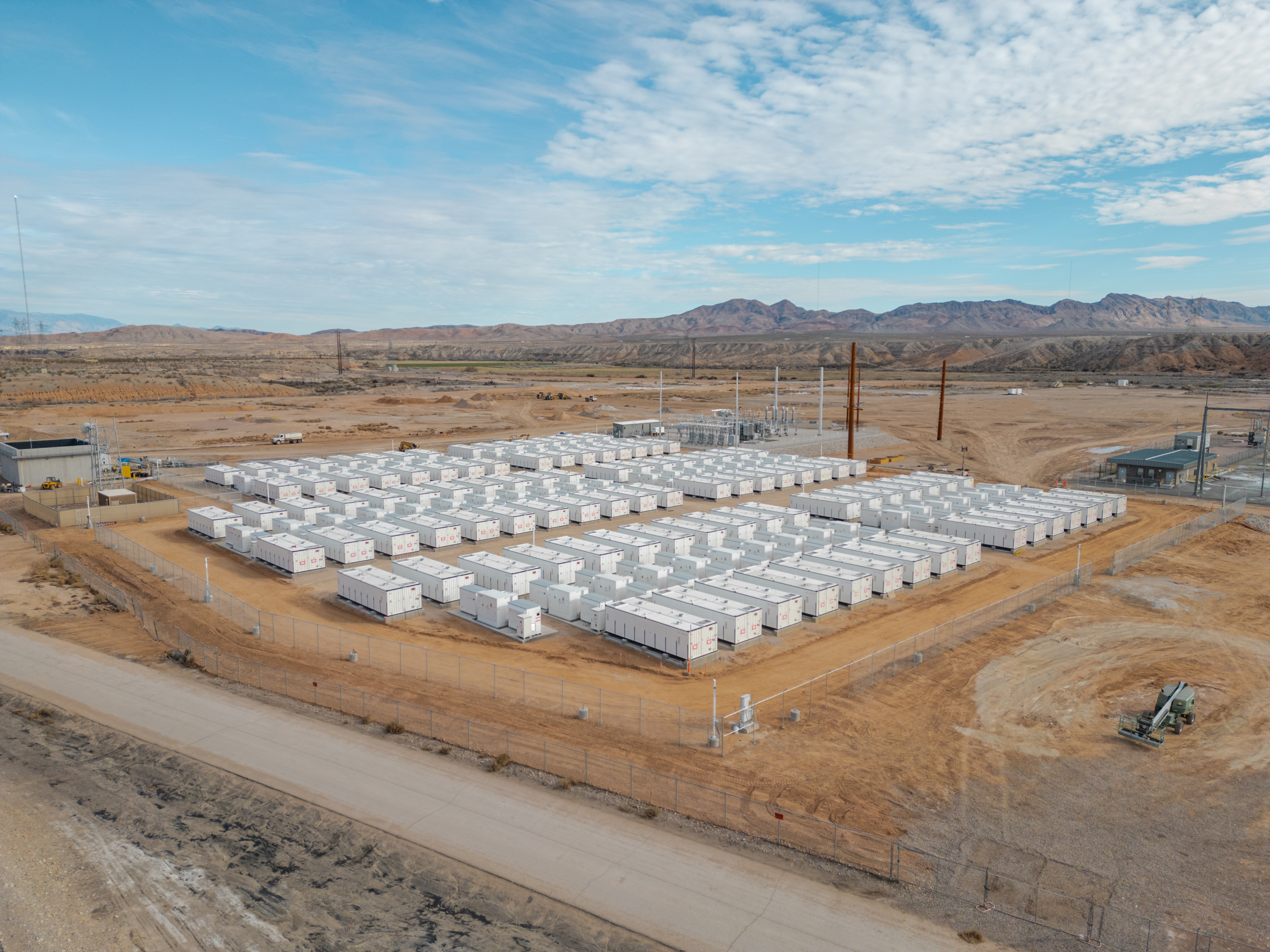
- The Reid Gardner BESS near Moapa, Nevada in late 2023.
- Country: United States
- Location: Moapa, Nevada
- Coordinates: 36°39′31.37″N 114°38′3.534″W
- Status: In Operation
- Construction began: August 23, 2023
- Commission date: December 23, 2023
- Construction cost: $257 million
- Owner: NV Energy
- Employees: 5

Power generation
- Storage capacity: 220 MW / 440 MWh

The Reid Gardner Battery Energy Storage System is a 220 MW / 440 MWh lithium-ion battery energy storage system (BESS) located near Moapa, Nevada, United States. Upon its initial commercial operation on December 23, 2023, it was the largest battery energy storage facility (by both power and energy) in Nevada. The Gemini Solar + Storage project (380 MW / 1,400 MWh) would surpass the Reid Gardner BESS to become the largest battery project in Nevada on July 18, 2024.

The Reid Gardner BESS provides grid energy storage to the Nevada electrical grid and is owned by the state's largest utility electricity provider, NV Energy. It is the largest battery project owned by the utility. A primary use case for the facility is to charge using plentiful daytime power from nearby solar photovoltaic power stations and then discharge during the key evening hours of 5:00 pm – 9:00 pm when more grid energy is needed. This lessens the need for NV Energy to purchase comparatively expensive power from regional real-time spot electricity markets, particularly the California Independent System Operator (CAISO).

The project was completed at a total cost of $257 million and received approximately $100 million in federal tax credits via the Inflation Reduction Act of 2022, passed by the Biden Administration. The project qualified for approximately $25 million of these tax credits as a result of being located within a census tract impacted by the closure of a former coal plant, in this case the Reid Gardner Generating Station formerly located on the site. According to NV Energy this federal support enabled it to directly lower costs for its ratepayers. At the facility's ribbon-cutting ceremony on April 25, 2024, NV Energy President and CEO, Doug Cannon, stated that as a result of the project, "Throughout 2024, our customers are going to see their bills be between 15 and 20% lower by the end of the year.”

== Construction ==
Project construction was conducted on a compressed timeline of just four months, with official ground breaking on August 24, 2023, and commercial operation date (COD) on December 23, 2023. United States energy storage and technology company, Energy Vault, provided the engineering, procurement, and construction (EPC) contract for the project. The facility utilizes 208 lithium iron phosphate (LFP) BESS enclosures manufactured by Chinese original equipment manufacturer (OEM), BYD. The operation of the system, including all interfacing with the electrical grid, is overseen by Energy Vault's energy management system (EMS) software.

== Development history ==
The site's former coal-fired Reid Gardner Generating Station was subject to decades of local community protest and litigation from the neighboring Moapa Band of Paiute Indians (among others), on account of negative environmental and health impacts caused by the facility. In tandem with this, the State of Nevada adopted its first renewable portfolio standard in 1997 and amended it most recently in 2019 to require electrical utilities such as NV Energy to provide 50% renewable energy by 2030. These and other factors would ultimately lead to the final closure of the coal plant in 2019.

Both to replace this loss of generation capacity and to address load growth in its service territory, NV Energy first proposed the addition of new battery energy storage in its 2021 Integrated Resource Plan (IRP) to the Public Utilities Commission of Nevada (PUCN).

NV Energy formally proposed the specific 220 MW / 440 MWh BESS project on a roughly 6-acre parcel of the decommissioned Reid Gardner site on March 18, 2022. The company submitted a Utility Environmental Protection Act (UEPA) permit for the project to the PUCN on March 30, 2022.

The PUCN granted conditional approval (pending UEPA authorization) for the project, adding it to NV Energy's IRP on July 13, 2022

Final UEPA permit approval was granted by the PUCN on August 7, 2023, with the project's construction phase formally commencing the following day.
