= Moapa Southern Paiute Solar Project =

Photovoltaic power plant located in Clark County,

- Country: United States
- Location: Clark County
- Coordinates: 36°31′48″N 114°46′13″W
- Status: Operational
- Construction began: March 21, 2014
- Commission date: March 17, 2017
- Owner: Capital Dynamics
- Operator: First Solar Energy Services

Solar farm
- Type: Flat-panel PV fixed tilt
- Site area: 2,000 acres (810 ha)

Power generation
- Nameplate capacity: 250 MW_{AC}
- Capacity factor: 28.2% (average 2017-2019)
- Annual net output: 617 GW·h, 308 MW·h/acre

The Moapa Southern Paiute Solar Project is a 250 megawatt (MW_{AC}) photovoltaic power plant located in Clark County, Nevada on the Moapa River lands of the Southern Paiute people. The project was commissioned in March 2017 and was constructed by First Solar and its sub-contractors in close consultation with the Moapa Band of Paiutes and federal agencies. It is the first utility-scale solar project to be located on North American tribal lands, and is anticipated to evolve as a model for similar future economic and environmental partnerships.

== Project details ==
The project is located 30 miles north of Las Vegas, Nevada on the 72,000 acre (112 sq mile) Moapa River Indian Reservation. It is the culmination of seven years of planning, including a final 2.5 years of construction work. The project entailed clearing a total of approximately 2,000 acres (2.2 sq miles) in dispersed sections that minimize the desert habitat and tribal cultural impacts. 115 Native Americans were employed throughout the development, including about 50 local tribal members, along with another 485 local subcontractors during the construction phase.

The project was originally developed by K Road Power Holdings, which was acquired by First Solar in 2013. TerraSmart provided foundation and racking services, and First Solar provided nearly 3.2 million CdTe thin film solar panels. The new facility also includes an onsite substation, and a new 5.5 mile 500 kV transmission line that connects to Nevada Power Company's Crystal Substation, serving energy users in California. First Solar Energy Services is providing ongoing operations and maintenance support, sustaining five permanent jobs which currently include two tribal members who are certified electricians.

The plant is currently owned by Capital Dynamics. The power is being sold to the Los Angeles Department of Water and Power (LADWP) under a 25-year power purchase agreement.

== Environment considerations ==
Based on the Environmental Impact Statement and Biological Opinion rendered in connection with United States Fish and Wildlife Service, First Solar has provided the Tribe, together with the U.S. Bureau of Land Management, with more than $1.6 million in mitigation fees for protection of the threatened desert tortoise.

Commissioning of the plant was shortly preceded by closure of the 558 MW coal-fired Reid Gardner Generating Station bordering the reservation. The project also accelerated LADWP's California-mandated withdrawal from support of the coal-fired Navajo Generating Station.

== Tribal benefits and opportunities ==
The project is providing long-term revenue for the Tribe through land lease payments, consulting fees, and an increase in sales of goods & services. It has also increased education on energy assistance programs aimed at stabilizing tribal member's electricity costs. The Maopa Band of Paiutes is currently pursuing additional renewable energy opportunities, including development of the 300 MW Eagle Shadow Mountain Solar Farm.

== Electricity production ==
Generation (MW·h) of Moapa Southern Paiute
Year	Jan	Feb	Mar	Apr	May	Jun	Jul	Aug	Sep	Oct	Nov	Dec	Total
2016										6,145	39,091	31,871	77,107
2017	35,003	35,035	56,293	59,702	65,350	65,047	60,985	61,388	55,938	55,033	40,329	38,482	628,585
2018	30,482	43,802	52,572	60,875	63,137	65,799	61,742	61,846	58,715	47,824	43,237	34,025	624,056
2019	35,539	37,677	42,792	56,562	57,530	63,174	63,157	63,677	56,190	56,125	41,417	25,880	599,720
Average Annual Production (years 2017–2019) -->													617,453

== Moapa Travel Plaza microgrid ==
A ceremony to inaugurate completion of a solar-hybrid microgrid system for the Tribe's travel business center and largest employer at the Valley of Fire exit off Interstate 15 north of Las Vegas was separately held on April 8, 2014, by the Tribal Council, and joined by officials from the U.S. Department of Agriculture (USDA) and system developer Stronghold Engineering. This system includes nine 28 kW Soitec CPV CX-S530 trackers, battery storage, and three diesel generators meeting Tier 4 EPA emission standards. The $2.38 million USDA-funded project is expected to save approximately $700,000 and 3.6 million CO_{2} pounds in annual fuel costs.

== See also ==
- Solar power in Nevada
- List of power stations in Nevada
