= Moapa Band of Paiute Indians =

Native American tribe in Nevada

Coordinates: 36.5780°N 114.7179°W

Moapa Band of Paiute Indians of the Moapa River Indian Reservation
Nuwuvi
- Location of the Moapa River Indian Reservation in Nevada

Total population
- 287

Regions with significant populations
- United States (Nevada)

Languages
- Southern Paiute, English

Religion
- Indigenous religion

Related ethnic groups
- other Southern Paiute

The Moapa Band of Paiute Indians of the Moapa River Indian Reservation are a federally recognized tribe of Southern Paiute, who live in southern Nevada on the Moapa River Indian Reservation.

== Name ==
In the past, the Moapa Paiute have been called Muappa or Moapat and the Nuwuvi.

== Art and material culture ==
The Moapa are adept at basketry. They traditionally wore clothing made of hide, yucca fibers, and cliff-rose bark cloth.

== History ==
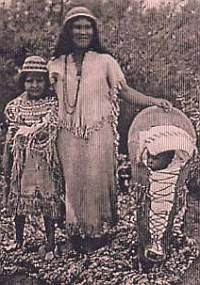
Southern Paiute woman and children at Moapa

Southern Paiute practiced irrigation horticulture before contact with Europeans. The Moapa traded with the Spanish in the later 18th and early 19th centuries who arrived here from California and Arizona, yet no missions were built in the area.

In 1869 the United States relocated by force the Southern Paiute to the Moapa area. Originally the entire Moapa River watershed and lands along the Colorado River (some of which area is now under Lake Mead) was assigned to the Moapa; however, in 1875 their reservation was reduced to 1,000 acres (400 ha).

They later suffered from decimation by disease in the 1920s and 1930s.

In 1941, they organized with a formal constitution. In 1980 the Moapa River reservation was expanded, with about 75,000 acres (30,000 ha) added. People on the reservation continue to suffer high rates of unemployment, and diabetes, resulting in some of the Moapa migrating to other parts of the country to find work.

== Reservation ==
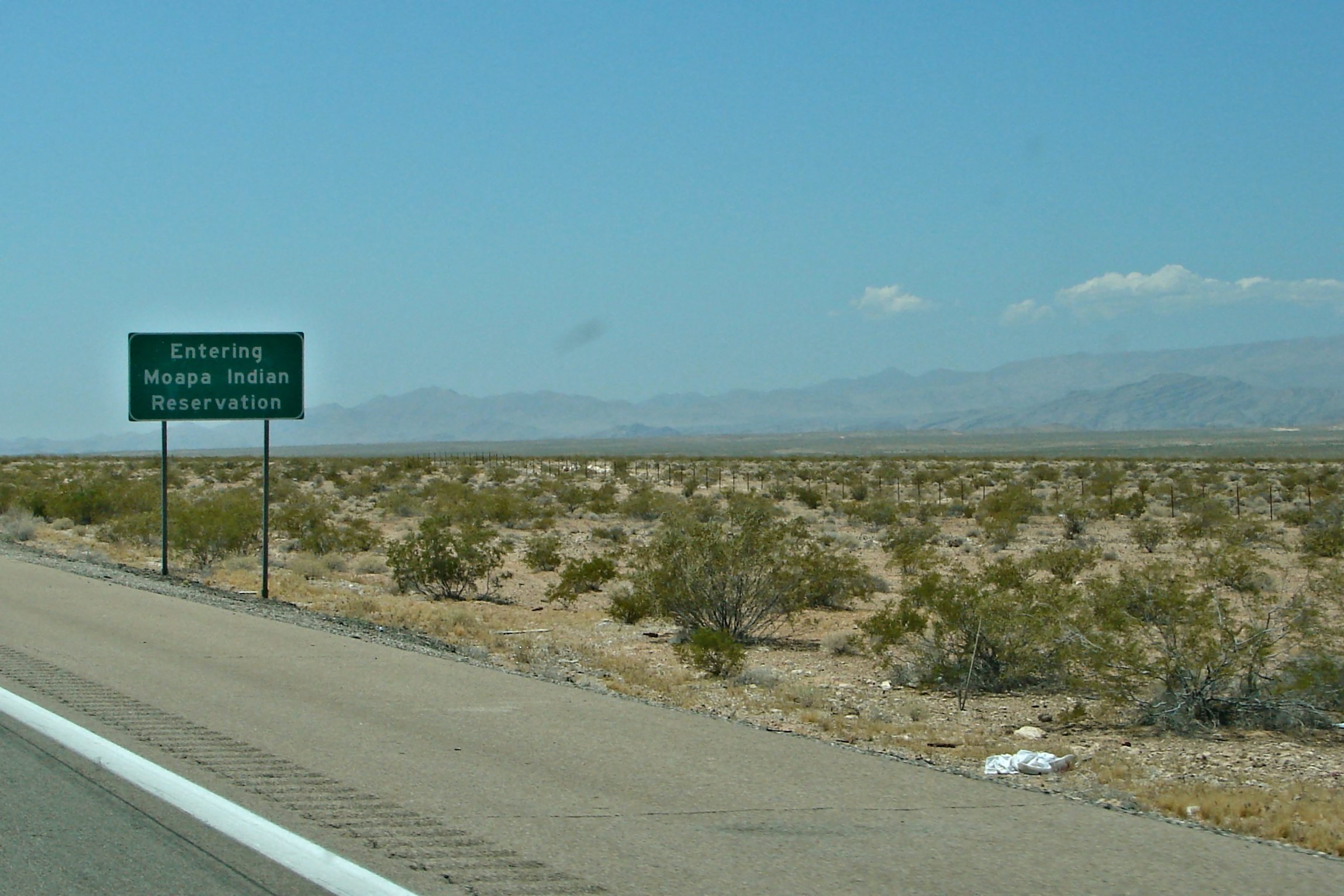
Moapa Indian Reservation welcome sign

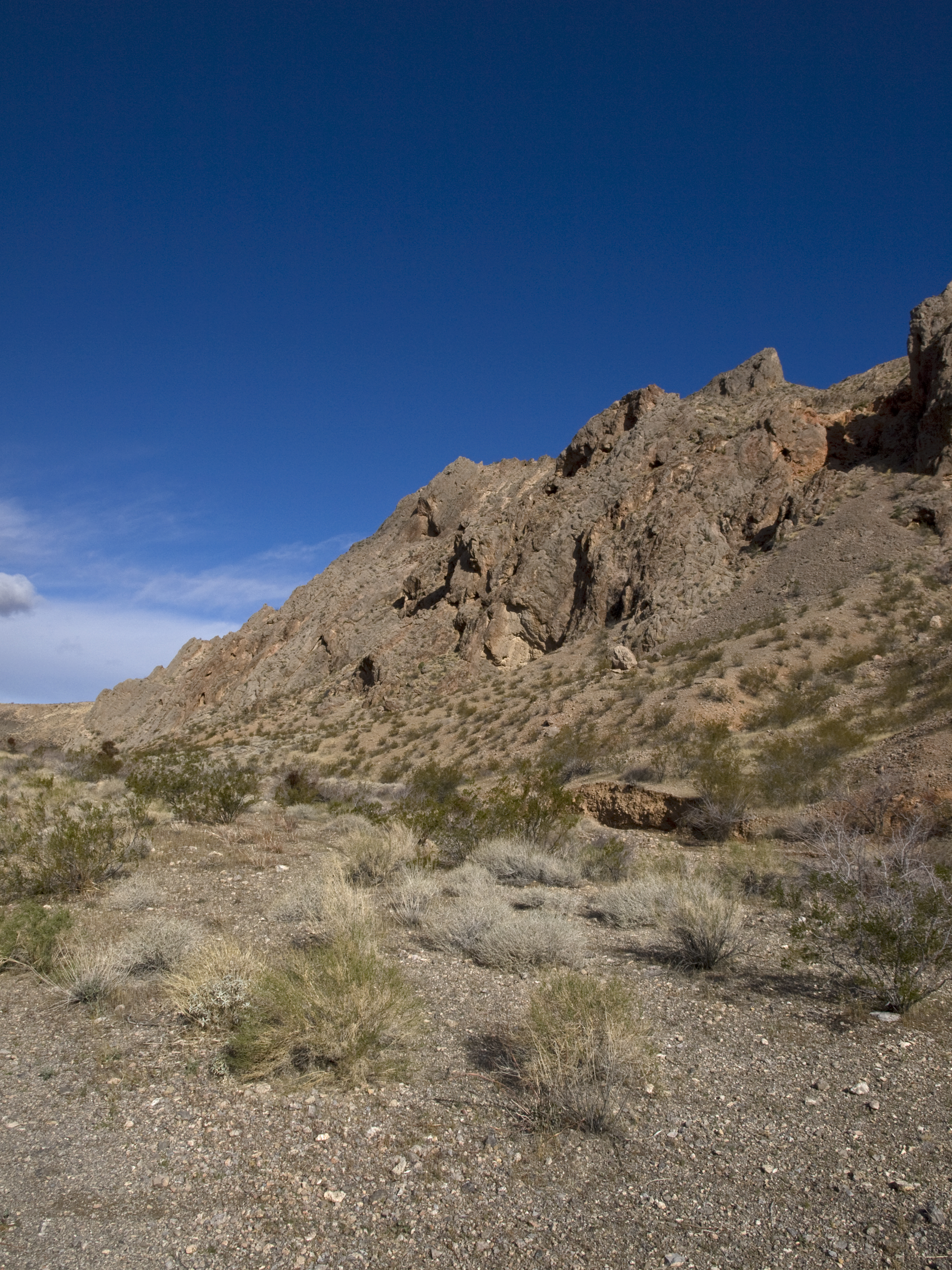
Rocks in the southern part of the reservation, immediately west of Valley of Fire State Park

The Moapa River Indian Reservation is located near Moapa Town, Nevada. Moapa River Indian Reservation consists of 71,954 acres (29,119 hectares). As of the census of 2010, the population was 238, up from 206 in 2000.

=== Energy ===
The reservation includes a 250 MW solar power generation facility known as Moapa Southern Paiute Solar Project which generates enough energy to power 111,000 homes, displacing around 341,000 metric tons of carbon dioxide annually. Another solar farm Eagle Shadow Mountain Solar Farm is being constructed in the reservation is a planned 300 MW solar project.

In 2019, Paiutes agreed with Berkshire Hathaway's NV Energy about two solar and battery projects:

8minutenergy Renewables develops the Southern Bighorn Solar & Storage Center with a 300 MW_{ac} solar array and 540 MWh (4 hours of 135 MW) storage.

EDF Renouvelables constructs the Arrow Canyon Solar Project with 200 MW_{ac} solar array and 375 MWh (5 hours of 75 MW) storage, operational by 2023.
