= Roos-n-More Zoo =

- Interactive map of Roos-n-More Zoo
- 36°41′42.21″N 114°35′25.27″W
- Date opened: 2006
- Date closed: 2016
- Location: Moapa, Nevada, United States
- No. of animals: 160+
- Website: roosnmore.org

Roos-n-More Zoo was a privately owned and operated non-profit zoo in Moapa, Nevada, about an hour northeast of the Strip. Its focus is a hands-on experience with a variety of exotic animals, including kangaroos, otters, coatis, lemurs, and others.

== History ==
Roos-n-More was founded by Valerie and Jay Holt in 2008. It was forced to close in 2014 after it failed to pass county inspections. In June 2016, Roos-n-More was given permission to reopen subject to several conditions, such as number of visitors, number of animals, and number of days open per month.

Roos-n-More's last day of operation and the zoo was permanently closed on December 17, 2016.
