= Reid Gardner Generating Station =

Coal fired plant in Nevada, US

Coordinates: 36.657°N 114.634°W

Reid Gardner Generating Station was a 557-megawatt coal fired plant on 480 acres (190 ha) located near Moapa, Nevada. It was named after former president of Southern Nevada Power Company (renamed Nevada Power Company in 1961), Reid Gardner. The plant was co-owned by current Nevada Power successor company, NV Energy (69%) and the California Department of Water Resources (31%). It consisted of four units. The first three were 100 MW units and were placed into service in 1965, 1968 and 1976 respectively. The fourth unit, placed into service in 1983, produced 257 megawatts (345,000 hp).

Three units of Reid Gardner were shut down in December, 2014; the fourth was shuttered in March 2017. The demolition of the plant occurred in 2019 and was considered complete as of July, 2020.

Approximately 6 acres of the site have since been redeveloped into the 220 MW/440 MWh Reid Gardner Battery Energy Storage System. The new facility is a battery energy storage system (BESS) utilizing lithium-ion batteries manufactured by BYD Official ribbon cutting for the new facility took place on April 25, 2024.

== Controversy ==
Due to its location adjacent to the Moapa Band of Paiute Indians reservation and one of their communities, the plant had long been a concern over the health effects on the nearby residents. As a result of several agreements to improve the air quality around the plant, the upgraded plant was ranked as one of the 10 cleanest coal plants in the US.

Concerns have also been expressed over particulates in the air as the plant can be upwind of the Grand Canyon and Bryce Canyon. Both of these canyons are Class I areas which place limits on the amount of haze allowed.

== Greenhouse gas emissions ==
Reid Gardner Station was a major emitter of carbon dioxide, the main greenhouse gas contributing to global warming. California's Department of Water Resources is planning to sell its stake in the plant, and purchase less carbon-intensive electricity as a part of its overall plan to reduce emissions mandated by California law (AB32, the Global Warming Solutions Act of 2006):

Electricity from the plant produces disproportionally high amounts of GHGs as compared to other SWP electricity generation sources. Emissions from Reid Gardner for electricity delivered to DWR have typically been over 1.5 million mtCO2e [million metric tonnes CO_{2} equivalents] per year (30%–50% of total DWR operational emissions). Between 1997 and 2007, the average emissions rate from Reid Gardner for electricity supplied to DWR has been 1.116 mtCO2e/MWh. This is more than twice the emissions rate associated with the general pool electricity from the integrated California market. (CA DWR 2012, page 54)

== Waste ==
The coal ash from the plant is stored on site in a 91-acre (37 ha) landfill.

== Ongoing activity ==
As of 2024 environmental remediation for portions of the site, overseen by the Nevada Division of Environmental Protection (NDEP), was ongoing.
