= Toquop Energy Project =

Energy Project

Coordinates: 36.940°N 114.228°W

Toquop Energy Project is a proposed energy facility located in Lincoln County near Mesquite, Nevada.

In 2003, the Bureau of Land Management (BLM) issued a rights-of-way for a natural gas-fired plant. In 2004, Toquop Energy applied to amend the ROW for construction of a coal-fired plant. In March 2008, the city of Saint George, Utah and the Washington County, Utah Commissioners withdrew support for the project because of possible effects on air quality.

In 2008, Toquop Energy Project was listed by the Nevada Governor as being on hold, along with three other Nevada coal projects that were postponed or on hold (Granite Fox Power Project near Gerlach, Ely Energy Project and White Pine Energy Station).

In 2010, Toquop Energy informed the BLM that the plan was to proceed with a gas-fired plant.

In 2012, the project was proposed to be a $1.4 billion (equivalent to $1.9 billion in 2024) energy facility. Phase 1 was to be a 100-megawatt (130,000 hp) photovoltaic plant scheduled for completion in 2012. Phase 2 of the project was a 700-megawatt (940,000 hp) natural gas station scheduled for completion in 2015.

In September, 2012, Sithe Global withdrew from the project and was replaced by EWP Renewable Corporation and the solar portion of the project no longer appeared. EWP planned to develop the project in two phases of 550 MW each with an anticipated completion in the first quarter of 2016.

A February 2013 press release stated that Toquop Power Holdings negotiated an option to purchase as much as 7,240 acre-feet (about 2.4 billion US gallons (9.1×10^{9} L)) of water at a cost of $12,000 (equivalent to $16,000 in 2024) per acre foot. At the time, construction was estimated to last 36 to 48 months and cost about $1.8 billion (equivalent to $2.4 billion in 2024). The construction phase of the project was expected to employ about 800 workers. Operation of the plant was estimated to provide 15 full time positions.

A July 2022 document by the Nevada Department of Wildlife (NDOW) states that on January 23, 2013 the NDOW received an application from the Toquop Power Holdings LLC for a 1,100 MW fossil fuel plant named Toquop Power Project.
