= Edward W. Clark Generating Station =

Power station in Las Vegas, NV, US

- The Edward W. Clark Generating Station in 2026.
- Country: United States
- Location: Whitney, Nevada
- Coordinates: 36.1106°N 115.0987°W
- Status: Operating
- Commission date: 1954
- Owner: NV Energy (formerly Nevada Power)
- Operator: NV Energy

Thermal power station
- Primary fuel: Natural gas

Power generation
- Units operational: 19
- Nameplate capacity: 1,102 MW

Edward W. Clark Generating Station is a 1,102 megawatt plant owned by Nevada Power on 115 acres (47 ha) located in the Las Vegas Valley town of Whitney, Nevada, USA. The plant consists of 19 units and first went into service in 1954 as Nevada Power’s first gas power plant.

== Units ==
- 75-kW photovoltaic system developed jointly with the University of Nevada and the National Renewable Energy Laboratory
- 1 General Electric MS-7000 gas-fired (1973)
- 2 Mitsubishi steam recycled heat gas-fired turbine generators
- 12 50-MW FT8 Pratt & Whitney gas-fired peaking units (2008)
