= Steptoe Valley =

Basin in Nevada, United States

Coordinates: 39.390°N 114.816°W

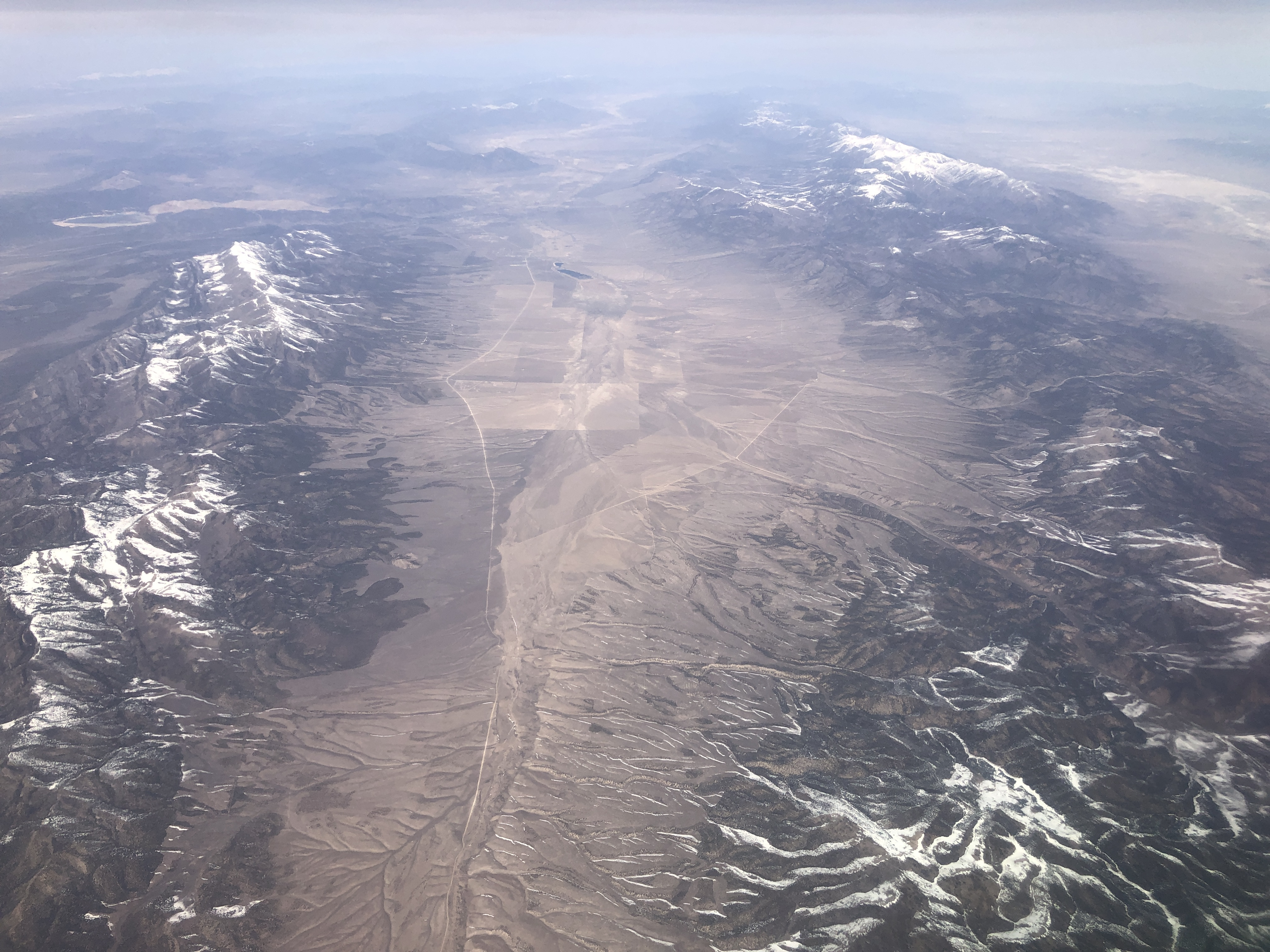
View north down Steptoe Valley from an airplane southeast of Ely

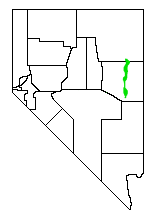
Location of Steptoe Valley within Nevada

The Steptoe Valley is a long basin located in White Pine County, in northeastern Nevada in the western United States. From the historic community of Currie, the valley runs south for approximately 100 miles (160 km). To the west are the high Egan Range and the Cherry Creek Range, while to the east is the even higher Schell Creek Range. U.S. Route 93 passes through much of the northern section of the valley, past the historic mining town of Cherry Creek and the communities of McGill and Ely, before crossing the Schell Creek Range at Connors Pass. Also found in this valley are the Ward Charcoal Ovens State Historic Park, the Steptoe Valley Wildlife Management Area, and Cave Lake State Park. At Egan Canyon and Schellbourne Pass (near Cherry Creek), the Overland Stage Line and the subsequent Pony Express and Transcontinental Telegraph made their way through the mountains of central Nevada in the 1860s.

The valley is named after Colonel Edward Steptoe, who explored the region in 1854.

The White Pine Energy Station and the Ely Energy Center, proposed in 2004 and 2006, were planned coal-fired power plants that were to be built in Steptoe Valley, but both projects were delayed in 2009.
