= Gateway Energy Storage =

Battery storage power station in Otay Mesa, California

- Country: United States
- Coordinates: 32°34′14″N 116°54′39″W

Power generation
- Nameplate capacity: 250 MW

Gateway Energy Storage is a large-scale battery storage power station, operated by grid infrastructure developer LS Power. It has 250 MW of power and a storage capacity of 250 MWh (1 hour), using lithium-ion battery cells from LG Chem.

The purpose of the battery is to provide power during times of peak demand after being charged partly with solar power during the day.

It is located next to the Pio Pico and Otay Mesa (1 GW combined) natural gas-fired power stations in Otay Mesa, California, on the outskirts of San Diego, at the Mexican border.

In May 2024, a section of the battery storage station burned over a five-day period. The fire was centered in one of seven buildings at the 250-megawatt site, which houses several lithium-ion batteries designed to support California's power grid. Evacuation orders and warnings were put in place in the immediate vicinity of the facility, an area that includes several businesses. The fire burned for five days due to continuous reignition from the batteries. LS Power told the San Diego Union-Tribune in June 2024 that it was trying to figure out the precise cause of the fire and assessing the damage to the 95,000 square-foot facility that stores about 6,700 racks of batteries.
