= Springbok Solar Farm =

Photovoltaic power station

- Country: United States
- Location: Kern County, California
- Coordinates: 35°14′24″N 117°57′36″W
- Status: Operational (Units 1 & 2)
- Construction began: 2015
- Commission date: May 2016 (Unit 1); Sep. 2016 (Unit 2)
- Owner: 8minutenergy

Solar farm
- Type: Flat-panel PV
- Site area: 1,400 acres (567 ha) (Units 1&2)

Power generation
- Nameplate capacity: 443 MW_{p}, 350 MW_{AC}
- Capacity factor: 31.6% (average 2017)
- Annual net output: 717 GW·h, 500 MW·h/acre

The Springbok Solar Farm is a 443 MW_{p} (350 MW_{AC}) photovoltaic power station in the northwestern Mojave Desert, near California City in eastern Kern County, California. The facility was developed and constructed by 8minutenergy Renewables in three phases. It is among the country's largest PV solar farms with a capacity of about 440 MW_{p} (350 MW_{AC}).

== Facility details ==
The project was developed by 8minutenergy, one of the largest independent solar power developers in the United States. The three Springbok solar facilities combined generate enough clean, renewable energy to serve more than 152,000 households. The amount of greenhouse gas emissions avoided is comparable to removing nearly 150,000 cars from the road. The power from all three projects is contracted to the Los Angeles Department of Water and Power.

== Project units ==
The Springbok Solar Farm consists of 3 project units, or construction phases:

- Springbok 1 Solar Project — a 137 MW_{dc} (105 MW_{AC}) solar power station using photovoltaics. Construction on the 700 acres (280 ha) site began in 2015 and was completed in July 2016.
- Springbok 2 Solar Project — a 191 MW_{dc} (155 MW_{AC}) solar power station also using photovoltaics which was completed in September 2016 on an additional 700 acres.
- Springbok 3 Solar Project — a 115 MW_{dc} (90 MW_{AC}) solar power station using photovoltaics completed in July 2019.

== Electricity production ==
Springbok Solar 1 nameplate capacities: 137 MW_{dc}, 105 MW_{ac}
annual net output: 299 GW·h (avg 2017)
capacity factor: 32.5%

Generation (MW·h) of Springbok Solar 1
Year	Jan	Feb	Mar	Apr	May	Jun	Jul	Aug	Sep	Oct	Nov	Dec	Total
2016							35,489	31,692	7,506	20,948	17,007	13,038	125,680
2017	11,869	13.258	24,783	26,443	33,722	36,527	33,263	30,773	28,675	26,418	16,330	17,181	299,242
Average Annual Production (years 2017)													299,000

Springbok Solar 2 nameplate capacities: 191 MW_{dc}, 155 MW_{ac}
annual net output: 418 GW·h (avg 2017)
capacity factor: 30.8%

Generation (MW·h) of Springbok Solar 2
Year	Jan	Feb	Mar	Apr	May	Jun	Jul	Aug	Sep	Oct	Nov	Dec	Total
2016									9,872	27,956	23,317	18,047	79,192
2017	16,565	18,502	34,587	36,904	47,062	50,976	46,421	42,946	40,019	36,869	22,790	23,977	417,618
Average Annual Production (years 2017)													418,000

== See also ==
- Beacon Solar Project
- Solar power plants in the Mojave Desert
- Solar power in California
- Solar power in the Mojave Desert — topics
