= Lava Ridge Wind Project =

Canceled wind power project in Idaho on federally-owned lands

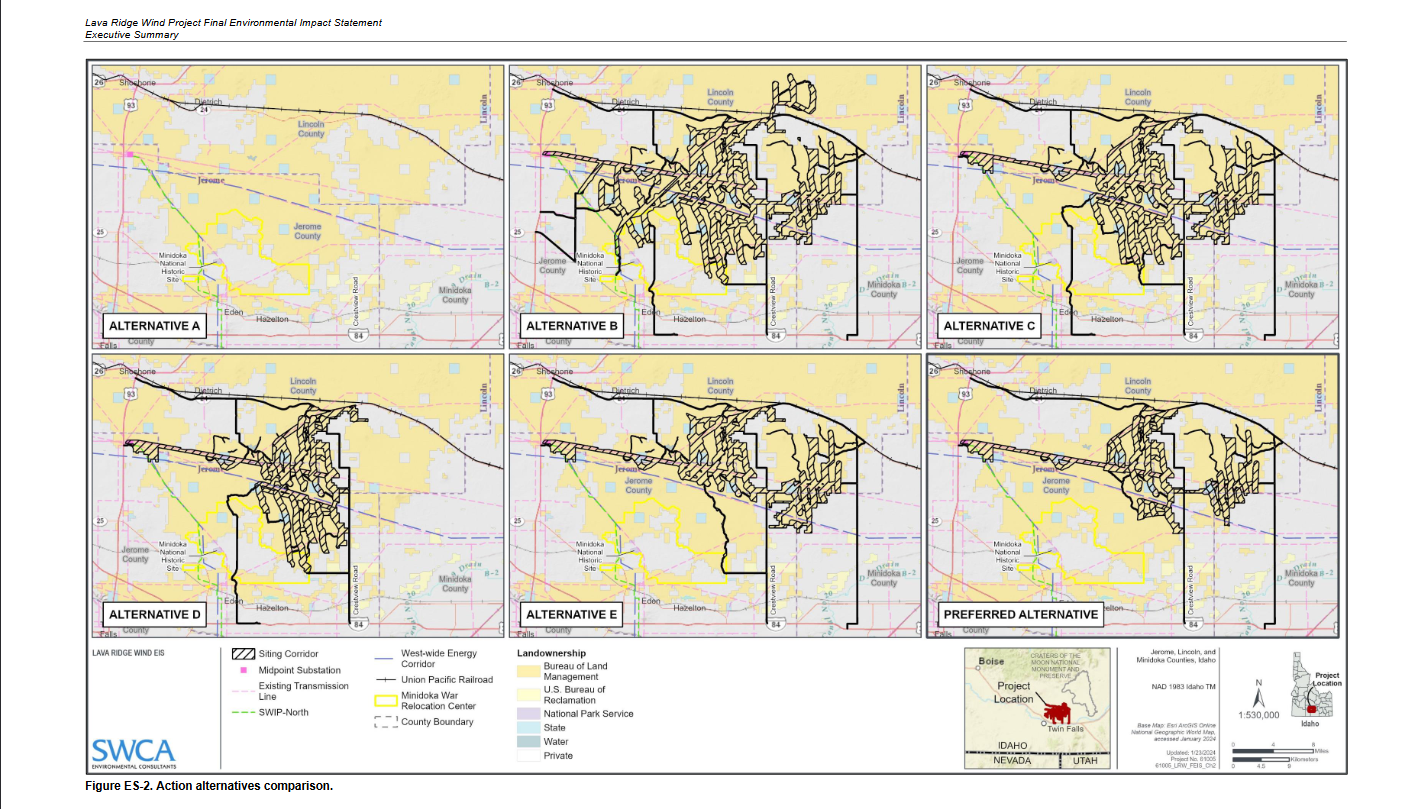
- Footprints of proposals from the final environmental impact statement. Preferred alternative at bottom right.
- Country: United States of America
- Location: Magic Valley, Idaho
- Coordinates: 42.829°N 114.321°W
- Status: In permitting process
- Owner: LS Power

External links
- Commons: Related media on Commons

The Lava Ridge Wind Project was a proposed wind energy plant to be built in the Magic Valley region of Idaho. It would have built a maximum of 400 wind turbines generating a nameplate capacity of over 1000 MW, making it one of the most powerful wind farms in the United States. The project faced opposition, in part due to turbines and infrastructure potentially being visible from the site of the former Minidoka internment camp. On June 6, 2024, the Bureau of Land Management issued their final environmental impact statement, outlining their preferred alternative, which would reduce the project's footprint by approximately 50% compared to the original proposal. On December 9, it approved a final project with up to 241 turbines, the closest of which to Minidoka National Historic Site would be 9 miles (14 km) away. The project's approval was canceled in 2025 after the transition from the Biden administration to the second Trump administration.

== Background ==
The Bureau of Land Management (BLM) manages federal lands in the United States, including the project site. Soon after taking office, President Biden signed an executive order which set a goal to increase onshore renewable energy production on Department of the Interior lands.

The BLM was asked by Congress to increase production of renewable energy on federal lands to at least "25 gigawatts of electricity from wind, solar, and geothermal energy projects by not later than 2025." By May 9, 2023, the BLM approved projects representing approximately 37% of that goal, and by April 11, 2024, the BLM had surpassed their goal more than a year early.

There were already 170 wind turbines within 30 miles (48 km) of the project area with a total generating capacity of 280 MW. Additionally, there are several other wind and solar projects proposed near the project. A project of similar size and capacity (1,500 MW), Taurus Wind, would be directly west of Lava Ridge. Salmon Falls Wind (800 MW) would be located approximately 30 miles (48 km) south of Lava Ridge. Three solar projects located just east of US 93 to the north and south of Midpoint Substation would cover 10,000 acres (4,000 ha) with a combined capacity of over 1,000 MW.

== History ==
Magic Valley Energy, LLC (a subsidiary of LS Power) initially submitted a plan of development to the BLM in February 2020. After revisions, the plan was resubmitted in August 2022. The draft environmental impact statement (EIS) published in 2023 identifies five alternatives (A–E). Alternative A would deny the project, Alternative B is the plan presented by MVE, and Alternatives C, D, and E would have smaller footprints and energy generation (see pictured).

The project is notable for its potential use of very large 6 MW wind turbines with hubs 460 feet (140 m) tall and blades up to 280 feet (85 m) long, reaching a maximum height of 740 feet (230 m) into the air. Groups opposed to the project have negatively commented on the height of these turbines, comparing it to twice the height of the Statue of Liberty [305 feet (93 m) from ground level] and the Space Needle [605 feet (184 m)].

=== Final EIS ===
The final environmental impact statement outlined the BLM's preferred alternative, which reduced the siting corridors from 84,051 acres to 44,758 acres (34,014 ha to 18,113 ha). The maximum turbine size was reduced from 6 MW to 5 MW (limited at 660 feet (200 m) tall), and the maximum number of turbines was reduced from 400 to 241. The maximum estimated generating capacity was reduced from 2,094 MW to 1,205 MW. The estimated annual generation was reduced from 6.4-8.3 TWh with all 6-MW turbines to 3.7-4.8 TWh with all 5-MW turbines.

Comparison of action alternatives
Alternative	Footprint size	Wind turbines	Estimated generation capacity	Estimated annual generation in terawatt hours (TWh) for the project operating at 35%–45% net capacity factor	Annual generation in comparison to Alternative B
B (original proposal)	197,474 acres	Up to 400 3-MW turbines or up to 349 6-MW turbines	1,200–2,094 MW	3.7–4.7 TWh with all 3-MW turbines 6.4–8.3 TWh with all 6-MW turbines	-
Preferred	103,864 acres	Up to 241 3-MW or 5-MW turbines	723–1,205 MW	2.2–2.9 TWh with all 3-MW turbines 3.7–4.8 TWh with all 5-MW turbines	38% reduction (3-MW) 42% reduction (5-MW)
C	146,389 acres	Up to 378 3-MW turbines or up to 259 6-MW turbines	1,134–1,554 MW	3.5–4.5 TWh with all 3-MW turbines 4.8–6.1 TWh with all 6-MW turbines	5% reduction (3-MW) 26% reduction (6-MW)
D	110,315 acres	Up to 280 3-MW turbines or up to 179 6-MW turbines	840–1,074 MW	2.6–3.3 TWh with all 3-MW turbines 3.3–4.2 TWh with all 6-MW turbines	30% reduction (3-MW) 49% reduction (6-MW)
E	122,444 acres	Up to 269 3-MW turbines or up to 194 6-MW turbines	807–1,164 MW	2.5–3.2 TWh with all 3-MW turbines 3.6–4.6 TWh with all 6-MW turbines	33% reduction (3-MW) 44% reduction (6-MW)

=== Environmental impact ===
Annual bird deaths are estimated at an average of 3,240–5,654 for Alternative B.

=== Current status ===
The BLM will issue its final record of decision at least 30 days after the final EIS was published on June 6, 2024. Reactions to the Final EIS were mostly consistent with existing concerns from the various stakeholders.

Following the results of the 2024 US presidential election, many community members believed that the incoming Republican administration would result in the BLM moving to reject the project. On the first day of the second Trump administration, the project was halted. The official cancellation came in August 2025 as the project approval was being reversed by Department of the Interior Secretary Doug Burgum.

== Reactions ==
=== Idaho ===
Some Idaho Republican lawmakers have opposed the project, including US Senator James E. Risch who argued to Secretary of the Interior Deb Haaland that most of Idaho's in-state energy generation already comes from renewable hydroelectric dams, though the state also must import one third of its electricity. Most of the project's power will be exported through the already approved Southwest Intertie Project (SWIP), also being developed by LS Power, which runs south to Las Vegas and Southern California.

Jerome, Minidoka, and Lincoln counties passed resolutions in opposition to the project in 2022 before the release of the draft EIS. Jerome County Commissioner Charles Howell stated that he "[had] not heard one person in the community support the project." During construction, lands which are currently being used for cattle grazing will be temporarily off limits to ranchers. MVE has stated that the land will be reopened for grazing after construction, pointing to "literally thousands of wind turbines between Texas and North Dakota that are on operating cattle ranches." Residents have also expressed concerns about noise from blasting to construct roads and bases for the towers, as well as use of water resources during construction. Communications and emergency services groups have warned that the towers may disrupt signals and accommodations may be needed.

Supporters say that it will generate tax revenue, which is projected to be around $1 million for Lincoln County alone. Additionally, Idaho currently imports most of its energy from other states, and this project would help Idaho increase its energy independence. John Robin, public lands director of the Idaho Conservation League argued that "although some of the purchasers might be in California, once the electricity is in the grid, it's available for the whole region and ... reduce fossil fuel emissions. We all benefit from that." If constructed, Idaho Power will likely purchase power to meet its renewable energy goal of 100% renewable energy by 2045.

The proposed Taurus Wind project, with a similar size, scope, and area, has also faced local opposition.

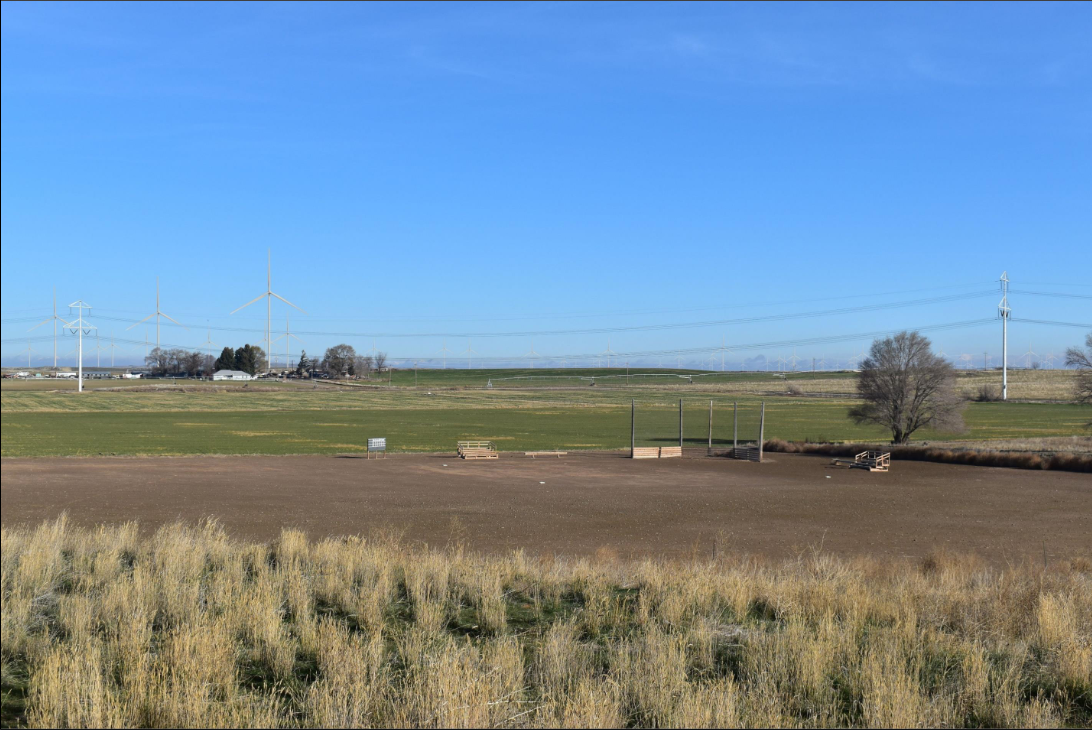
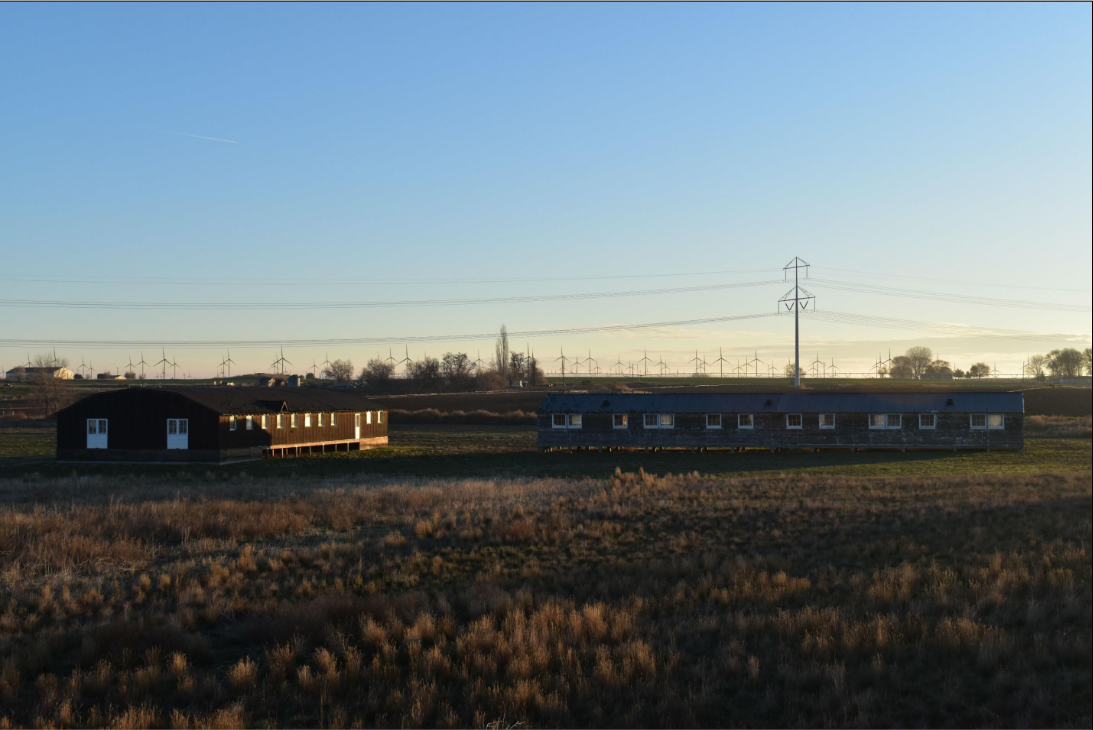
Simulated views from Minidoka NHS under Alternative B (original proposal) with 6 MW turbines

=== Japanese American community ===
In Alternative B, the nearest turbine would be 1.7 miles from the Minidoka visitor center; in Alternative C it would be 5.5 miles away. Opponents from the Japanese American community say that the visual and auditory impact of wind turbines in the background of Minidoka National Historic Site detracts from its somber nature. Robyn Achilles, executive director of Friends of Minidoka compared it to other locations, saying "You wouldn't build a huge wind project over another concentration camp, or Gettysburg, or the Washington Monument." Friends of Minidoka has continued its opposition to the project, including the scaled back alternatives. It is also asking for a 237,000-acre area around Minidoka to be protected as an "area of critical environmental concern."

The BLM's preferred siting alternative reduced the original project area by 50% to ensure all wind turbines would be at least 9 miles from Minidoka National Historic Site. Along with the turbine height limit, this would substantially reduce visual impact.

=== Native American community ===
Under the Fort Bridger Treaty of 1868, Shoshone people are allowed to hunt off the reservation on "unoccupied lands of the United States so long as game may be found thereon." The Shoshone-Bannock Tribe expressed concerns related to how the project would impact hunting and gathering, as well as the night sky, which would be illuminated by safety lights on the turbines.
