= One Nevada Transmission Line =

Grid transmission cable in the east of the state

One Nevada (ON Line) is a 235-mile (378 km), 500-kilovolt, 600-megawatt power line that runs from Southern to Northern Nevada. NV Energy owns 25% of the transmission line and operates and offers the line's capacity under the terms of NV Energy's Open Access Transmission Tariff. Great Basin Transmission South (a subsidiary of LS Power) owns 75% of the line. The line runs from the new Robinson Summit Substation in Ely to Apex, connecting with the existing NV Energy Harry Allen Generating Station, and uses tubular guyed-V towers on a single point foundation.

== History ==
Construction on the $510-million (equivalent to $714 million in 2024) line began in 2010. The line provides a way to connect renewable energy projects along the eastern edge of Nevada with the existing electrical grid.

In February 2011, the U.S. Department of Energy issued a $343-million (equivalent to $470 million in 2024) loan guarantee to finance the project. The project also includes the new Robinson Summit Substation, interconnection to the Harry Allen Substation, expansion of the Falcon-Gonder Substation, and new telecommunication facilities. The line was expected to be energized in 2013. The line was energized in January 2014.

The line is part of the larger Southwest Intertie Project Transmission Line (SWIP) project which will extend the line north to Jerome County, Idaho. The extension will create a 501-mile-long (806 km) line. The extension's backers received a $331 million Department of Energy loan in April 2024 to get construction started.
