= Beacon Solar Project =

Photovoltaic and battery storage power station in Kern County, California

- Country: United States
- Location: Kern County, California
- Coordinates: 35.257°N 118.013°W
- Status: Operational
- Construction began: 2014
- Commission date: 2017
- Owner: Los Angeles Department of Water and Power

Solar farm
- Type: Flat-panel PV
- Site area: 2,500 acres (1,000 ha)
- Power purchase agreement: < $0.085 / kWh for 25 years

Power generation
- Nameplate capacity: 250 MW_{ac} (291 MW_{ac})

The Beacon Solar Project is a photovoltaic power station in the northwestern Mojave Desert, near California City in eastern Kern County, California. Split into five phases, the combined Beacon solar facilities generate 250 MW of renewable energy for the Los Angeles Department of Water and Power (LADWP). The five phases of the project, fully completed in December 2017, include a total of 903,434 individual solar photovoltaic modules, mounted onto Nextpower single-axis tracking systems.

The Beacon Solar Project was originally proposed by NextEra Energy using parabolic trough mirrors as solar energy collectors for a solar thermal electric energy generation project. The solar thermal electric powerplant technology configuration raised significant concerns during the CEQA environmental permitting process. Among the many environmental concerns, the natural gas supply, the wastewater management and disposal, and the water supply during construction and during operation of the plant were concerns specific to the solar thermal technology. The project was reconfigured, simplified and rescoped to a photovoltaic technology, eliminating the solar thermal technology concerns, though significant other environmental concerns remained.

LADWP acquired the entire project, including the land and the environmental permitting for the site in 2012 as photovoltaic technology, which gained economic advantages over solar thermal and other technologies as a result of rapidly decreasing costs of solar photovoltaic modules. LADWP contracted Hecate Energy to develop three phases of the project, for 162 MW, and SunEdison, to develop the other two phases, for 88 MW. SunEdison's stake in the project was later acquired by Capital Dynamics. Hecate Energy's stake in the project was acquired by sPower (Sustainable Power), and was completed by sPower, who was later acquired by AES.

In October 2018, LADWP commissioned the Beacon Battery Energy Storage System (BESS), with 10 MWh/20 MW of storage to stabilize the energy sent to the grid by the solar panels.

== Projects ==
The Beacon Solar Project consists of five solar power station projects:

- Beacon 1 — 56 MW_{ac} (56.5 MW_{dc}) solar power station using photovoltaics, which began commercial operations in early 2017.
- Beacon 2 — 48 MW_{ac} (59.6 MW_{dc}) solar power station using photovoltaics, commissioned in December 2017.
- Beacon 3 — 56 MW_{ac} (63.0 MW_{dc}) solar power station using photovoltaics, which began commercial operations in early 2017.
- Beacon 4 — 50 MW_{ac} (63.9 MW_{dc}) solar power station using photovoltaics, which began commercial operations in early 2017.
- Beacon 5 — 40 MW_{ac} (48.2 MW_{dc}) solar power station using photovoltaics, commissioned in December 2017.

== Production ==
Beacon 1 generation, annual

Beacon 2 generation, annual

Beacon 3 generation

Generation (MW·h) of Beacon 3
Year	Jan	Feb	Mar	Apr	May	Jun	Jul	Aug	Sep	Oct	Nov	Dec	Total
2016												3,013	3,013
2017	6,373	7,630	12,961	6,373	16,330								49,667
Total													52,680

Generation (MW·h) of Beacon 4
Year	Jan	Feb	Mar	Apr	May	Jun	Jul	Aug	Sep	Oct	Nov	Dec	Total
2016												4,962	4,962
2017	5,186	6,525	11,301	5,186	14,017								42,215
Total													47,177

Beacon 5 generation, annual

== See also ==
- Springbok Solar Farm
- Solar power plants in the Mojave Desert
- Solar power in California
