= Eagle Shadow Mountain Solar Farm =

Planned 300 megawatt (MWAC) photovoltaic power station north of Las Vegas

- Country: United States
- Location: Clark County, Nevada
- Coordinates: 36°33′21″N 114°45′07″W
- Status: Proposed

Solar farm
- Type: Flat-panel PV
- Site area: 2,200 acres (8.90 km^{2})

Power generation
- Nameplate capacity: 420 MW_{p}, 300 MW_{AC}
- Annual net output: 900 GW·h (projected)

Eagle Shadow Mountain Solar Farm is a planned 420 MW_{p} (300 MW_{AC}) photovoltaic power station north of Las Vegas, Clark County, Nevada on the Moapa River Indian Reservation. The facility is being developed by 8minutenergy Renewables and when completed will be the largest photovoltaic system on tribal lands in North America. It is also the largest component within NV Energy's current tranche of renewable energy projects that will create over 1 Gigawatt of new electricity supply.

The electricity generated will have a flat rate of $23.76 per megawatt-hour throughout its 25-year power purchase agreement (PPA) term, which could establish a new record-low rate for a solar PPA contract.

The project is also part of NV Energy’s plans to retire a 254 MW coal-fired unit in a power-constrained region of Nevada at the end of 2021, four years ahead of schedule.

== See also ==
- Moapa Southern Paiute Solar Project
- Solar power in Nevada
- Renewable energy in the United States
- List of photovoltaic power stations
