= LS Power =

American independent power company founded in 1990

LS Power is an American independent power company that owns, operates, and develops power generating stations, storage facilities, and transmission lines. Founded in 1990, the company originally focused on developing and selling natural gas power plants, but has since expanded into developing renewable energy plants and transmission lines. The company's approach focuses on competing to win transmission line contracts at a lower price than established utilities and using its large asset portfolio to develop projects with "high barriers to entry." With a combined capacity of 2.3 GW of pumped storage hydropower and lithium-ion battery storage, LS Power has the largest non-utility owned energy storage portfolio in the United States.

They own a portfolio of energy companies including EVGo, Endurant Energy, Rise Light & Power, and CPower Energy Management. In 2021, LS Power created REV Renewables as a subsidiary focused on renewable energy and energy storage.

== Wind energy ==
LS Power, through their subsidiary Magic Valley Energy, proposed to build the Lava Ridge wind farm on land owned by the Bureau of Land Management in Idaho. The initial proposal was made in February 2020, during the first Trump administration, and made progress on permitting during the Biden administration, but was canceled by the second Trump administration.

In collaboration with TotalEnergies and Corio Generation, LS Power proposed the Attentive Energy One project off the coast of New York and New Jersey. The 1400 MW project was initially selected by NYSERDA, but failed to agree on a contract after General Electric canceled plans to build an 18 MW wind turbine.

== Transmission infrastructure ==
The Southwest Intertie Project (SWIP) is a series of AC transmission lines with the goal of connecting northwest and southwest regions of the WECC grid. In 2014, the 500 kV One Nevada (ON) Line was powered on, connecting Harry Allen substation near Las Vegas with Robinson substation near Ely in northeast Nevada. In 2020, the 500 kV Desert Link line connected Harry Allen substation with Eldorado substation to create a connection between the Las Vegas and Los Angeles regions.

The final stage of the project is SWIP-North, which will connect Midpoint substation in Twin Falls, Idaho with Robinson substation in Nevada. In 2024, the project secured a loan of up to $331 million from the US Department of Energy. SWIP-North will be funded by California ISO and Idaho Power in a 77.2% / 22.8% split.

In 2016, MISO selected LS Power subsidiary Republic Transmission to construct the first competitively awarded project in their region. The 31 mile, 345 kV line connecting Duff, Indiana to Hancock County, Kentucky was brought online in 2020. In 2023, MISO selected Republic Transmission to construct a 345 kV line from Hiple substation in Topeka, Indiana to the border with Michigan.

== Pumped storage hydro ==
In 2018, it purchased a variety of assets from FirstEnergy, including a 23.8% stake (716 MW) in the Bath County Pumped Storage Station, the world's second-largest pumped storage generating station. However, FirstEnergy retained a 16% stake in the Bath County station's generation and a 40% stake in its transmission facilities.

Through their subsidiary REV Renewables, LS Power operates and owns stakes in Seneca Pumped Storage Generating Station, Yards Creek Generating Station, and Bath County Pumped Storage Station. Their stake in these stations account for a combined capacity of 1.6 GW of pumped storage generation, making them the largest non-utility owner and operator of pumped-storage hydropower in the United States.

== Lithium-ion battery storage ==
In July 2018, the 40 MW capacity Vista Energy Storage facility commenced operations in Vista, California, which was the largest lithium-ion battery storage facility in the United States at the time.

In 2020, the 250 MW capacity Gateway Energy Storage was connected to the grid, at the time the world's largest lithium-ion battery storage facility. In May 2024, the facility caught on fire, causing major damage and lasting five days.

LS Power has multiple other battery storage facilities in planning and construction, including Diablo Energy Storage (200 MW) in Pittsburg, California, LeConte Energy Storage (125 MW) in Calexico, California, and Ravenswood Energy Storage (316 MW) in Queens, NY on the site of the current Ravenswood Generating Station.
