= Avantus =

PV power plants manufacturer

- Industry: PV power plants manufacturer
- Founded: 2009; 17 years ago
- Founder: Tom Buttgenbach; Martin Hermann
- Headquarters: United States
- Owner: KKR (2024–present)
- Website: avantus.com

Avantus, formerly known as 8minute Solar Energy, is an American photovoltaic (PV) developer of utility-scale PV power plants and energy storage. Founded in 2009 by Tom Buttgenbach and Martin Hermann, it was acquired by KKR fifteen years later.

== History ==
In 2014, Kern County Board of Supervisors approved development of Redwood Solar Farm which received investment of $30 million by Macquarie Capital. In 2018, it had raised $200 million through a joint venture with J.P. Morgan Asset Management and Upper Bay Infrastructure Partners for its pipeline of utility-scale solar projects.

A 25 year Power Purchase Agreement was signed with Los Angeles Department of Water and Power in 2019.

In July 2019, the company sold its Holstein solar project to Duke Energy. The Holstein project was the company's first completed development in Texas, with approximately 709,000 solar panels on 1,300 acres in Wingate, Texas.

In early 2020, 8minute Solar Energy received investments from the University of California system, J.P. Morgan Asset Management and Upper Bay Infrastructure Partners to fund development of solar projects. In 2022, the same year that the University of California filed a lawsuit against the firm, 8minute Solar Energy announced they had secured $400 million in financing from institutional investor EIG.

In March 2024, two years after being rebranded as Avantus, it was announced a majority stake in the company had been acquired by the US private equity company KKR for an undisclosed amount. The acquisition was completed three months later.

== Developments ==
It has developed solar farms that includes Eagle Shadow Mountain Solar Farm which is a 420 MW_{p} (300 MW_{AC}) photovoltaic power station north of Las Vegas, Clark County, Nevada. Mount Signal Solar which is a 594 MW_{p} (460 MW_{AC}) photovoltaic power station west of Calexico, California, a 137 MW Springbok Solar Farm and the 191 MW Springbok 2 solar project, both located in Kern County, California.

== See also ==
- First Solar
- SolarCity
- Solar power in California
