= Cherry Creek, Nevada =

Historic mining town in Nevada, U.S.

Cherry Creek
- Census county division & Unincorporated community
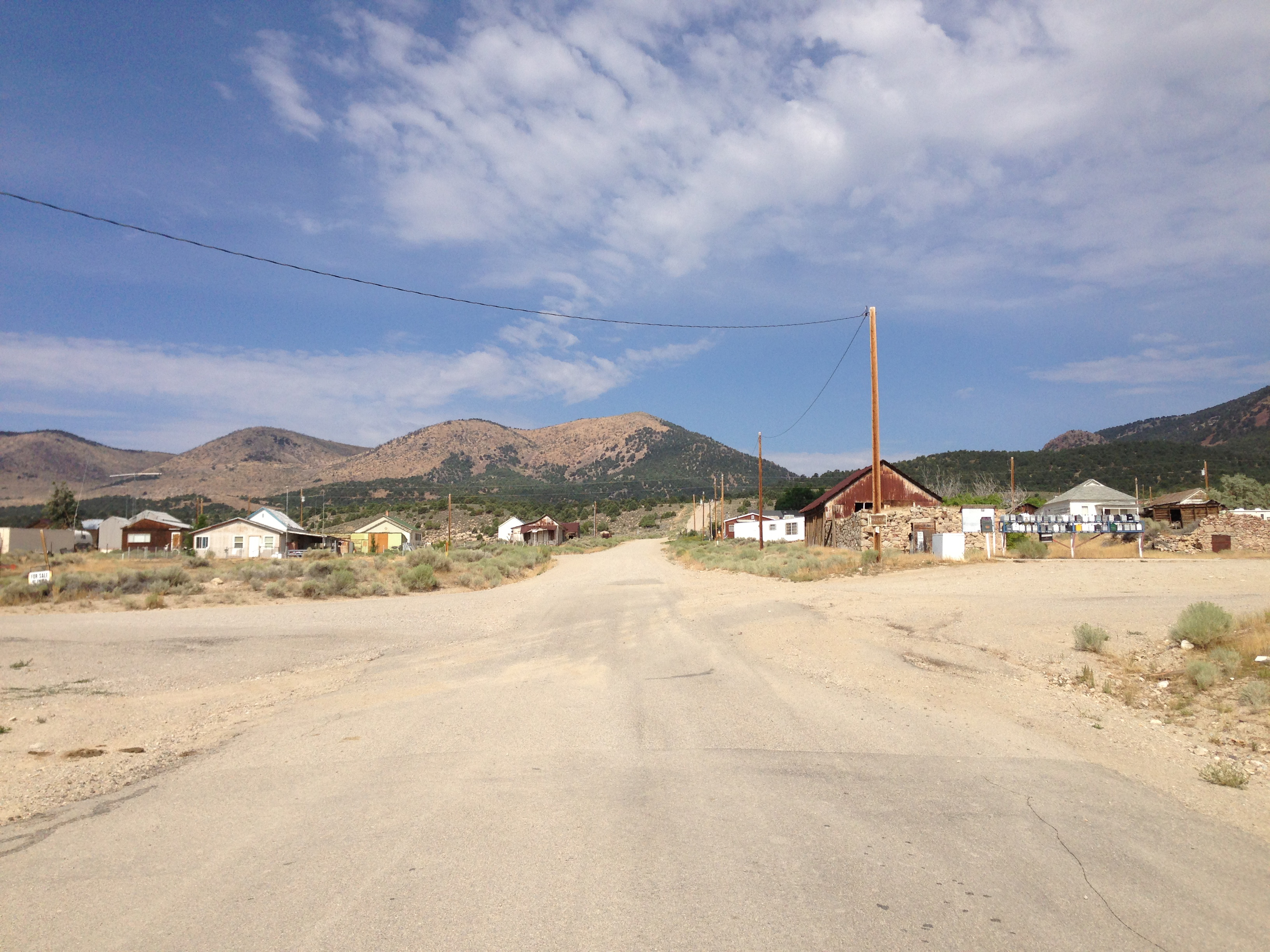
- Entering Cherry Creek from former SR 489

- Location within the state of Nevada
- Coordinates: 39°54′02″N 114°53′09″W
- Country: United States
- State: Nevada
- County: White Pine
- Elevation: 6,113 ft (1,863 m)

Population (2010)
  - Total: 72
- Time zone: UTC-8 (Pacific (PST))
  - Summer (DST): UTC-7 (PDT)
- GNIS feature ID: 857939

Nevada Historical Marker
- Reference no.: 52

Cherry Creek is a historic mining town located in northern White Pine County, in northeastern Nevada in the western United States. It is a census county division (CCD), with a population at the 2010 census of 72.

== Geography ==
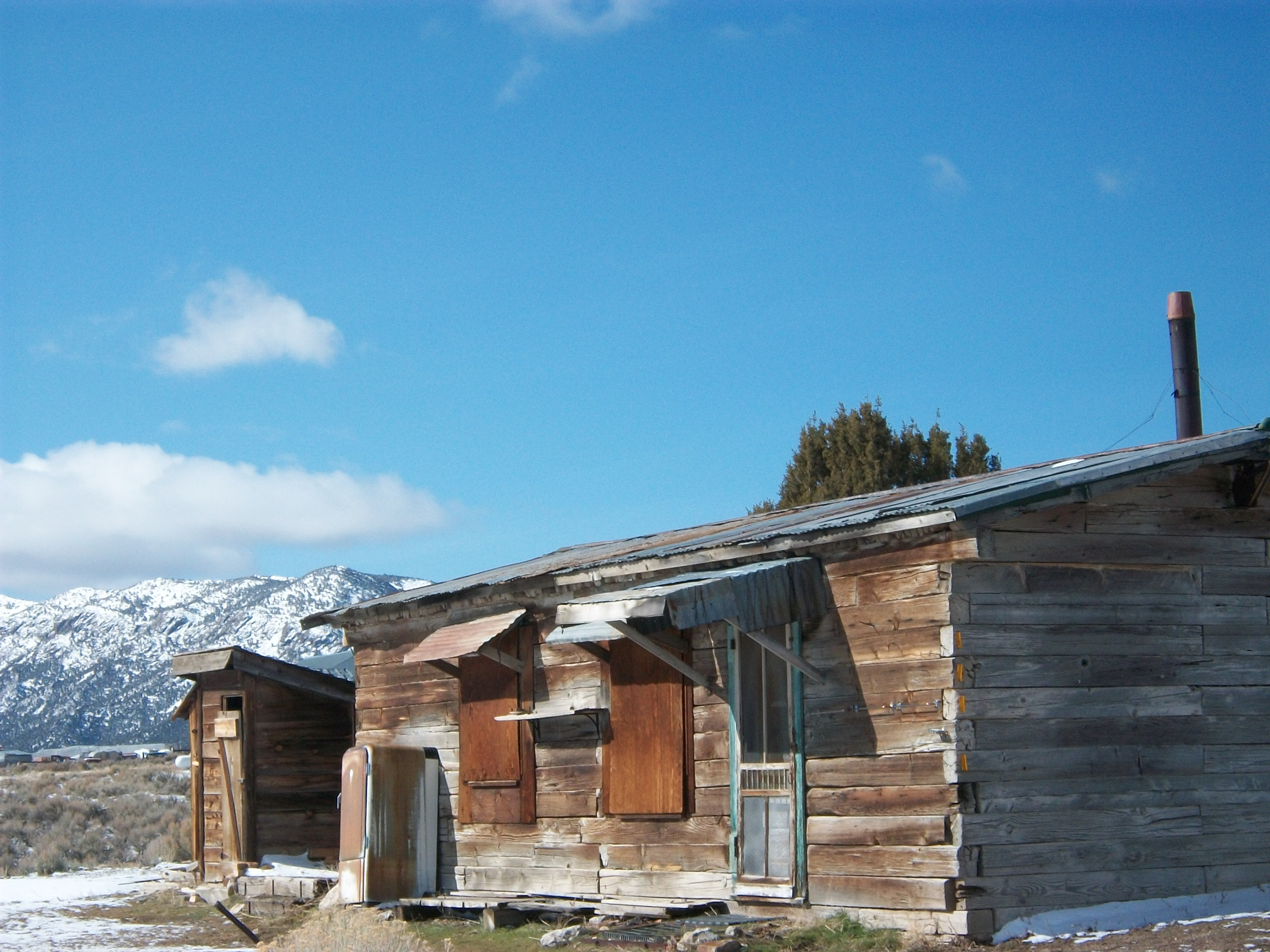
A building in Cherry Creek that belongs to the Rude Family from California. This old cabin built out of railroad ties was the assay office during the mining operations and is now used as a hunting cabin.

The community of Cherry Creek is located in the northern part of the long Steptoe Valley, north of the modern communities of McGill and Ely. Immediately to the west is the Cherry Creek Range, while to the east is U.S. Route 93 and the Schell Creek Range. Just to the south, in Egan Canyon, the Pony Express and subsequent stage lines made their way through the mountains of central Nevada in the 1860s.

== History ==
Cherry Creek has existed as a community for over 140 years.

=== Founding ===
In the early 1860s, the area around Cherry Creek was discovered to have substantial mineral deposits of gold and silver. The community was founded on September 21, 1872, when two prospectors from nearby Egan Canyon located the "Tea Cup" claims, rich deposits of silver and gold ore. By spring of 1873, the community had an estimated population of 400.

=== Boom and bust ===
In 1873, Cherry Creek included a livery stable, a blacksmith shop, a large hotel, several boarding houses, restaurants, and more than twenty saloons. Cherry Creek continued to grow in 1873. Wells Fargo opened a station in Cherry Creek, and the Cherry Creek post office also opened for business in 1873. However, in early 1874, most of the original mineral claims in the area began to play out. As a result, Cherry Creek's economy and population began a decline, and by 1875, although limited production continued, most of the local mills and mines had closed. For 1875–1880, Cherry Creek remained a small mining community, sustaining a much smaller population and workforce than it had during the prosperous years of 1872–1874.

Cherry Creek's economy and population rapidly expanded once more in 1880, when additional deposits of gold and silver were discovered. Over the next two years, Cherry Creek experienced its biggest boom. By the end of 1881, a single one of the larger mines locally employed over 200 men. Cherry Creek became the largest voting precinct in White Pine County. By 1882, the community was at its peak, with both its economy and population exceeding their previous highs during the boom of 1873–1874. During 1882, the community was estimated to have a population of 7,800, of which 6,000 were estimated to be transient mine workers. During this time, 28 saloons were located in Cherry Creek. There were also a substantial variety of stores and local businesses, most catering to local mine workers. A stagecoach route to Toano, in Elko County, was created and in service during this time. By the end of 1882, one local mine had produced more than one million dollars in gold bullion, a huge amount for the time. The boom of 1880–1883 was the most economically prosperous period in Cherry Creek's history.

In 1883, a financial crash devastated the local economy. Many mines closed, and the community entered a rapid decline. In 1888, a fire destroyed a substantial portion of the town's business district. By the census of 1890, the population had fallen to 350. Cherry Creek experienced large, damaging fires in 1901 and 1904. Many of the original buildings in the community were burnt down and had to be rebuilt. In 1905, Cherry Creek's economy experienced a modest revival when a number of local mines reopened. Cherry Creek remained the home of several hundred people, and the base of substantial mining activity, until the late 1940s.

=== Present day ===
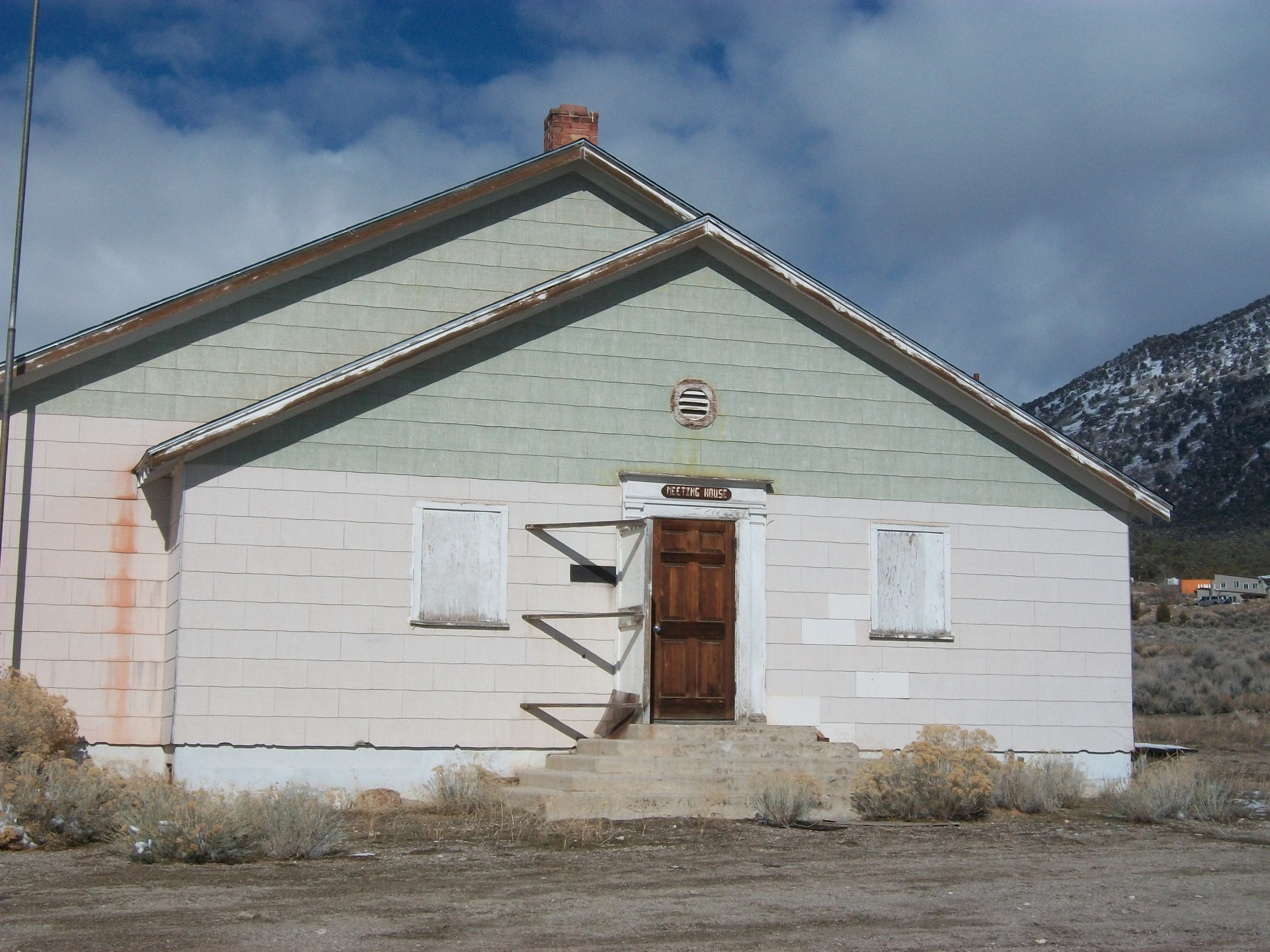
The old meeting house

Since the 1940s, the community has slowly declined in size, although mine leaseholders have always been active in the district, and occasional mining activity has taken place. Total production for the district since 1872 has been estimated at 20 million dollars. Throughout the 2000s, the "Barrel Saloon" a local business, remained open; however, it closed in July 2010. Many historic structures, including a museum, an early one-room schoolhouse, and the Cherry Creek Barrel Saloon, still stand among more modern buildings.

== Climate ==
Like most of the Great Basin, Cherry Creek experiences a semi-arid climate with cold winters and warm to hot summers. Winters are long and tend to be both dry and cold. Daytime highs are usually only a few degrees above freezing, and nighttime temperatures are bitterly cold. Summer days can be hot, but Cherry Creek's low humidity and high altitude temper the effects of the heat. Nights are cool, even in the summer. At Cherry Creek's high elevation, the thin, dry air cools quickly after sunset.

Climate data for Cherry Creek, Nevada (Elevation 6,130ft)
Month	Jan	Feb	Mar	Apr	May	Jun	Jul	Aug	Sep	Oct	Nov	Dec	Year
Record high °F (°C)	56 (13)	67 (19)	78 (26)	83 (28)	95 (35)	98 (37)	104 (40)	97 (36)	94 (34)	83 (28)	73 (23)	64 (18)	104 (40)
Mean daily maximum °F (°C)	38.4 (3.6)	43.3 (6.3)	52.3 (11.3)	59.0 (15.0)	70.3 (21.3)	81.2 (27.3)	91.9 (33.3)	88.2 (31.2)	77.8 (25.4)	63.8 (17.7)	50.8 (10.4)	38.8 (3.8)	63.0 (17.2)
Mean daily minimum °F (°C)	17.6 (−8.0)	22.9 (−5.1)	27.1 (−2.7)	31.3 (−0.4)	39.4 (4.1)	48.1 (8.9)	57.6 (14.2)	54.1 (12.3)	44.7 (7.1)	34.7 (1.5)	26.3 (−3.2)	18.9 (−7.3)	35.2 (1.8)
Record low °F (°C)	−12 (−24)	−3 (−19)	9 (−13)	12 (−11)	19 (−7)	31 (−1)	47 (8)	34 (1)	26 (−3)	19 (−7)	−4 (−20)	−9 (−23)	−12 (−24)
Average precipitation inches (mm)	0.80 (20)	0.69 (18)	0.63 (16)	1.19 (30)	0.67 (17)	0.68 (17)	0.56 (14)	0.36 (9.1)	0.69 (18)	0.75 (19)	0.48 (12)	0.83 (21)	8.32 (211)
Source: The Western Regional Climate Center

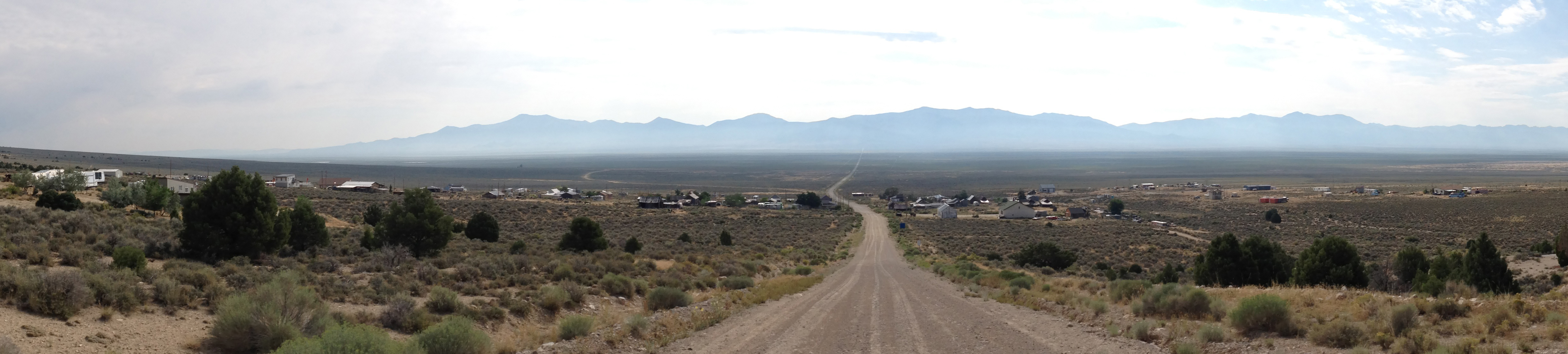
Cherry Creek viewed from the east
