= Tom Buttgenbach =

American businessman in the solar industry

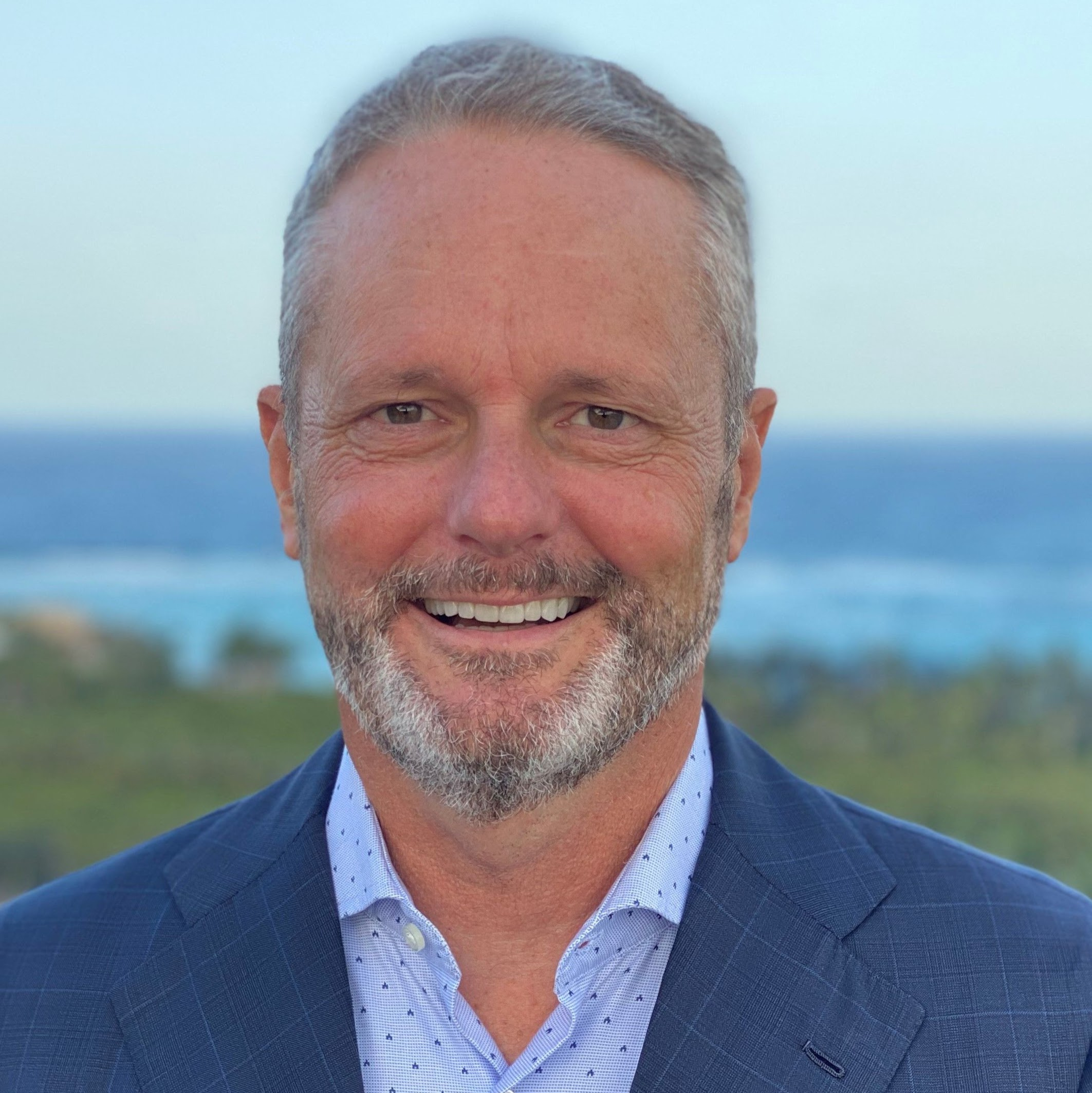
- Tom Buttgenbach
- Education: University of Cologne; California Institute of Technology
- Occupation: Businessman

Thomas H. Buttgenbach is an American businessman in the clean energy industry [1]. He is the founder of Avantus, one of the largest independent solar and energy storage developers in the US [2][3] (previously 8minute Solar Energy, and 8minutenergy Renewables LLC).

Under Buttgenbach’s leadership, Avantus secured over $10 Billion in power purchase agreements and project financings. With over 30 GW of solar and 90 GWh of energy storage, capable of powering the homes of more than 20 million Americans day and night, Avantus had one of the largest clean energy portfolios in the U.S., before he sold it to KKR in mid-2024.[4]

== Biography ==
Buttgenbach attended the University of Cologne in Germany for undergraduate studies in physics and mathematics and earned a Ph.D. from the California Institute of Technology (Caltech) in physics and astronomy, where he attended as a Fulbright Scholar. His thesis advisor was Thomas G. Phillips. For his thesis work, Buttgenbach constructed a submillimeter heterodyne receiver which coupled the mixer to the telescope using a lens rather than a waveguide. He verified the efficiency of its design by installing it at the Caltech Submillimeter Observatory, and making astronomical observations with it. His thesis, Quasi-optical sis receivers and astrophysical observations at submillimeter wavelengths, was the first to highlight the discovery of neutral atomic carbon outside of the Milky Way galaxy.

Buttgenbach worked in management consulting with McKinsey & Company, investment banking and real estate development. In 2001, Buttgenbach founded Dock3, a local delivery service. In 2015, Dock3 was sold to Leverage Concierge, a division of ACI Specialty Benefits.

In December 2018, Buttgenbach launched a $200 million joint venture along with J.P. Morgan Asset Management and an affiliate of Upper Bay Infrastructure Partners. In December 2018, Buttgenbach purchased the shares of fellow co-founder Martin Hermann from 8minutenergy Renewables, LLC. In June 2019, the company made a name change to 8minute Solar Energy. The company is known for innovations in clean energy, including the Springbok solar cluster, the first solar photovoltaic (PV) facility to better the cost of fossil fuels, and the Mount Signal solar cluster, the largest operating solar PV project in the nation. In 2022, 8minute Solar Energy announced they had secured $400 million in financing from institutional investor EIG.

Beginning in 2021, 8minutenergy was involved in legal disputes with Class B investors, culminating in two separate arbitration matters, both of which resulted in Final Awards dismissing all claims against 8minutenergy. At the conclusion of the first arbitration, the arbitrator dismissed all claims brought against 8minutenergy, effectively clearing all named parties of the allegations. [1] The final award in that matter was confirmed by the San Francisco Superior Court [2] with a judgment in favor of 8minutenergy of nearly $10 million entered on June 14, 2022. This resolution allowed the company to move forward, focusing on its core business of developing large-scale solar energy projects. That judgment was later upheld on appeal. The second arbitration suffered the same fate with the final award resulting in a dismissal of all claims against 8minutenergy with an award of fees and costs. The final award in that arbitration was also confirmed by the San Francisco Superior Court in May 2023 with a judgment entered in favor of 8minutenergy. That matter was not appealed. A complaint previously filed in Alameda Superior Court by The University of California Regents was resolved to the satisfaction of both parties and was dismissed with prejudice on August 13, 2024.

Buttgenbach and his companies have worked with the Sierra Club to ensure solar development protects the environment. Buttgenbach is on the Green Advisory Board of the California League of Conservation Voters and sits on the board of directors for the Los Angeles Business Council. In 2020, he was named an Entrepreneur of The Year for Greater Los Angeles by Ernst & Young. In 2022, he was recognized as a Visionary in the L.A. Times’ C-Suite: Trends, Updates and Visionaries Magazine and named to the Board of Directors for the Los Angeles Business Council.
