= Nevada Power Company =

Former Las Vegas-based electricity company

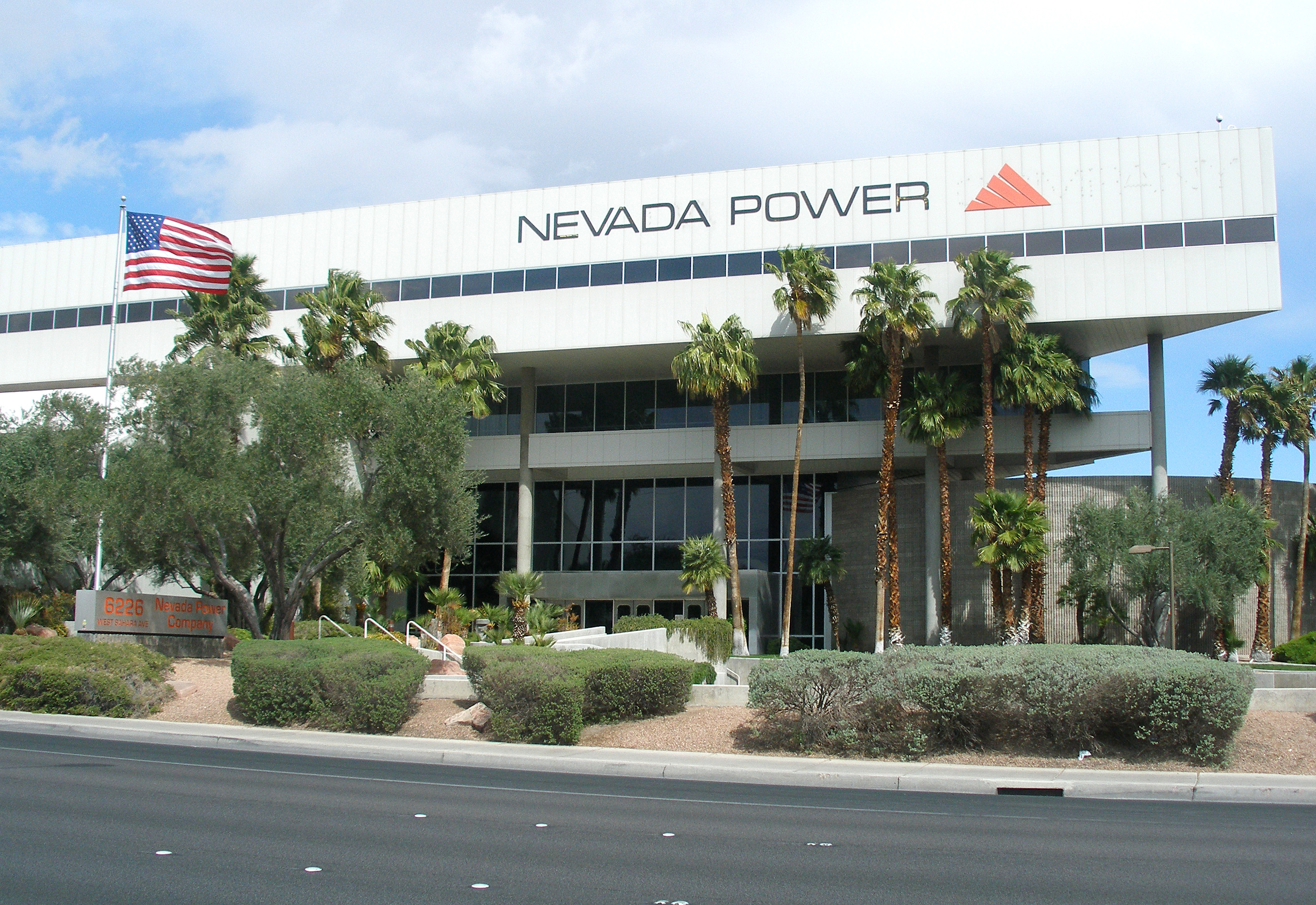
Nevada Power Company headquarters in Las Vegas

Nevada Power Company (NPC) was a Las Vegas-based company that produced, distributed, and sold electricity in the southern part of the state of Nevada. In 2005, it had over 700,000 electric customers in parts of three Nevada counties — a service area of more than 4,000 square miles (10,000 km^{2}). In 1998, Nevada Power merged with Nevada's other major utility, Sierra Pacific Resources. It continued as a subsidiary of Sierra Pacific until 2005, when the company changed its name to NV Energy.

== History ==
Nevada Power was founded on March 20, 1906 as Consolidated Power and Telephone, the electric and telephone company for the year-old town of Las Vegas. It split into two companies in 1929. The telephone company, Southern Nevada Telephone Company, eventually was acquired by Centel. It was later owned by Sprint and Embarq, and is now part of CenturyLink. The power company became Southern Nevada Power. In 1937, it became one of the first utilities to receive power from the Hoover Dam. As the Las Vegas Valley boomed in the 1950s, its power needs exceeded the power available from the dam, and Southern Nevada Power began building its own steam turbines. After buying the Elko-Lamoille Power Company, it was renamed Nevada Power in 1961. A year later, it became the first Nevada company on the New York Stock Exchange.

In 1999, the company merged with Sierra Pacific Resources of Reno, the main electric and natural gas provider for northern Nevada. The merged company retained the Sierra Pacific name, but moved its headquarters to Las Vegas.

In the late 1990s and early 2000s, Nevada Power held off on building new plants and was looking to divest its existing plants based on Nevada's deregulation of power generation and distribution. However, after the energy crisis in 2001, the deregulation was put on hold and Nevada Power resumed pursuing options to generate more of its own power.

In 2003 the company installed two of the largest phase shifting transformers in the world at its Crystal switching station to deal with the large quantity of imported power.

As a part of the plan to internally generate more of its power, Nevada Power in October, 2004 purchased from Duke Energy North America a partially competed 1,200 megawatt plant. Plans were announced on June 21, 2005 to purchase from Pinnacle West Capital Corporation its 75% interest in a 570 megawatt plant. The other 25% share is owned by the Southern Nevada Water Authority.

In January 2006, Nevada Power announced plans to decommission units 1, 2, and 3 at the Clark Station which provide a total of 175 MW of power.

On September 22, 2008, Nevada Power Company began doing business as NV Energy. This is the result of the corporate decision to unify its image under a single brand.

In 2013 Berkshire Hathaway's MidAmerican Energy (now Berkshire Hathaway Energy) announced it would purchase NV Energy. MidAmerican and NV Energy say both companies' boards have approved the sale and they expect it to close in the first quarter of 2014, subject to approval by regulators and NV Energy shareholders. The move will expand MidAmerican's customer base by over one million to 8.4 million worldwide and boost its assets to $66 billion.

== Power plants ==
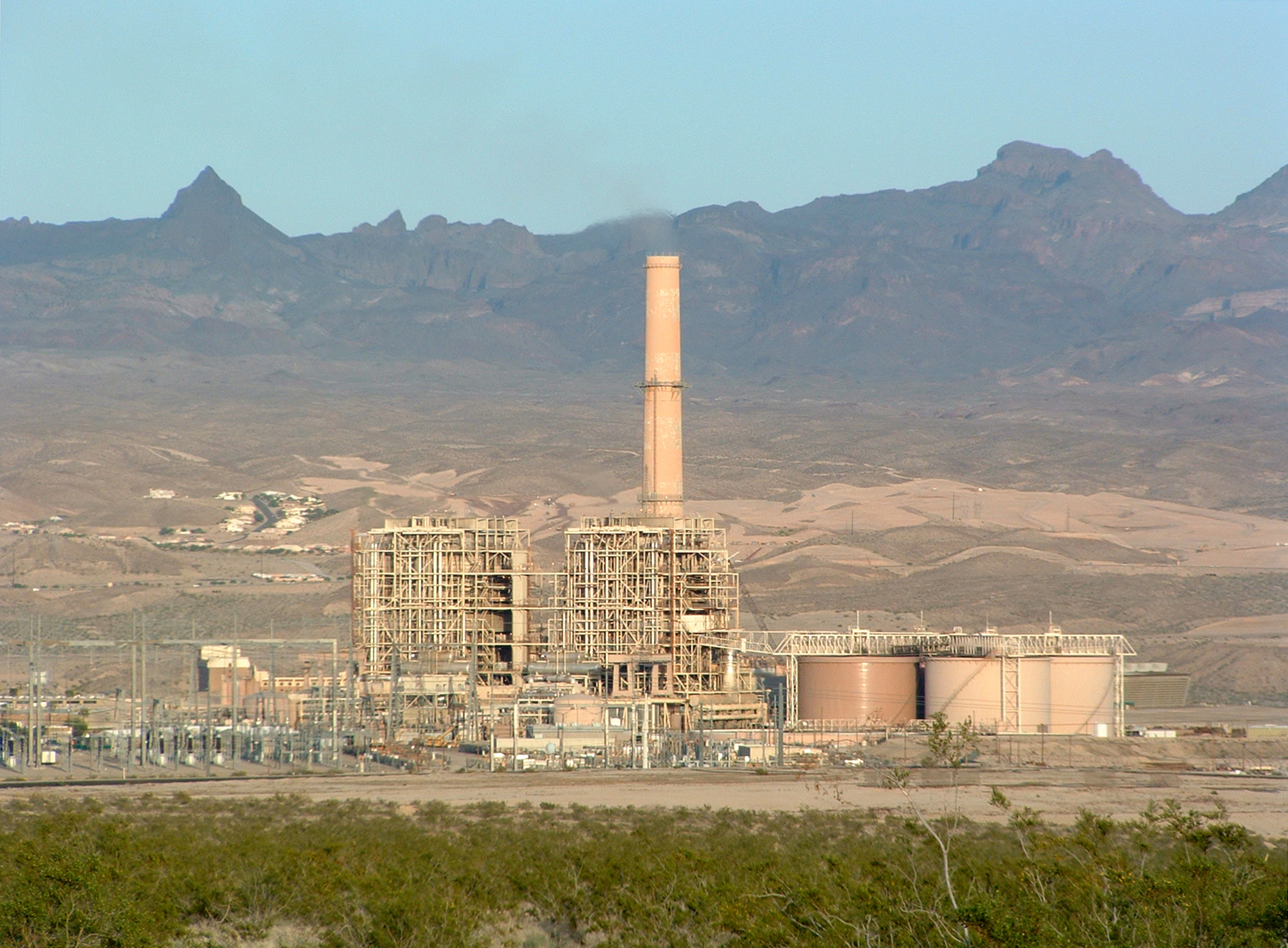
Mohave Generating Station

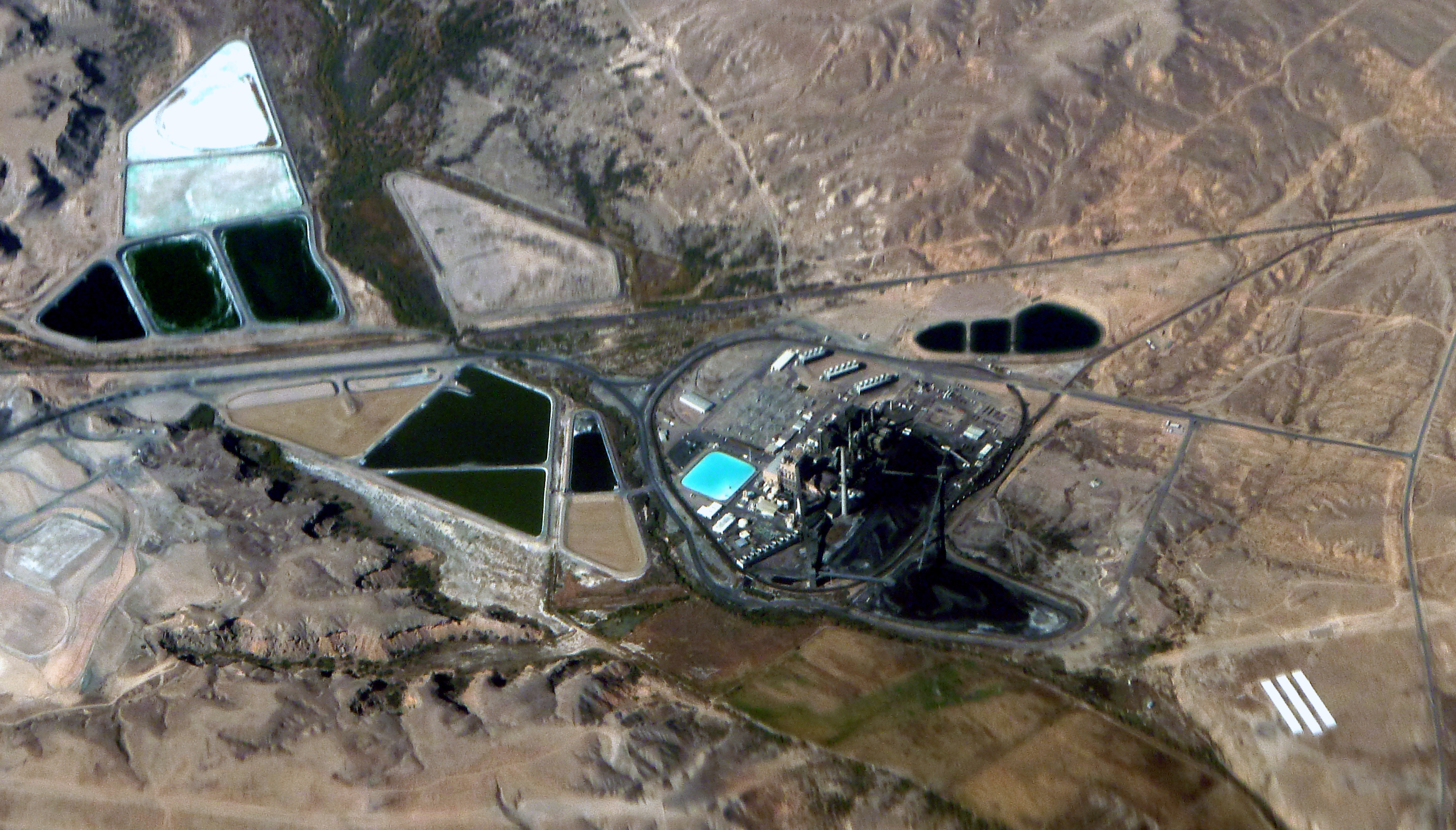
Reid Gardner Generating Station

In the early years, power was generated by the company. However, in 1914 the company contracted to purchase power from other companies. This practice continued until the 1950s when the company again started running power plants to provide a portion of its base supply.

- Current plants include:
  - Base plants
    - Wholly owned
      - Harry Allen Generating Station (144 megawatts) natural gas fired unit, in 2006 a 100 kW solar photovoltaic system will be added. 484 megawatt combined-cycle natural gas facility being added.
      - Edward W. Clark Generating Station (1084 megawatts - 10 units). In January 2005, plans announced to shut down units 1, 2 and 3. Opened in February 1956 was a 32 megawatt plant. A 75 kW (3-25 kW arrays) high concentrating solar photovoltaic system was added in 2006. (located in Clark Country)
      - Chuck Lenzie (1,102 megawatts - 4 natural gas fired units) located north of Las Vegas
      - Walter M. Higgins Generating Station – 530 megawatt natural gas peaking plant located near Primm, Nevada
    - Partial ownership
      - Mohave Power Station (1,580 megawatts, 222 megawatts Nevada power's share, coal fired) (Shut down on December 31, 2005. Dismantling began in 2009.)
      - Silverhawk Power Station (520 megawatt) natural gas fired located north of Las Vegas that is 25% co-owned by Southern Nevada Water Authority
      - Reid Gardner Generating Station – (557 megawatt) coal fired plant located near Moapa, Nevada and 31% co-owned by the California Department of Water Resources
  - Peaking plants
    - Harry Allen (80 megawatts) in planning
    - Sunrise/Sun Peak (150 megawatts) natural gas fired peaking plant located in Las Vegas
- Other notable sources
  - Hoover Dam provides about 355 megawatts to the Nevada Power system. Contrary to common belief, Las Vegas does not get most of its power from the dam. It also does not get most of the power produced at the dam. California and Arizona get most of the dam's generated power.

== Power transmission ==
Several generating stations are located in Nevada Power's service area. In addition, Nevada power historically imported a large portion of its power from other areas. As a result, the company's main transmission lines both serve its customers and provide inter-company power transport services.

- Major power lines:
  - 500 kV
- Major switch yards
  - Mead Substation
  - Crystal Substation

== Regional transmission organizations ==
Nevada Power is a member of the regional transmission organization RTO West, formally known as "Grid West" .
