= Moapa, Nevada =

- Census-designated place
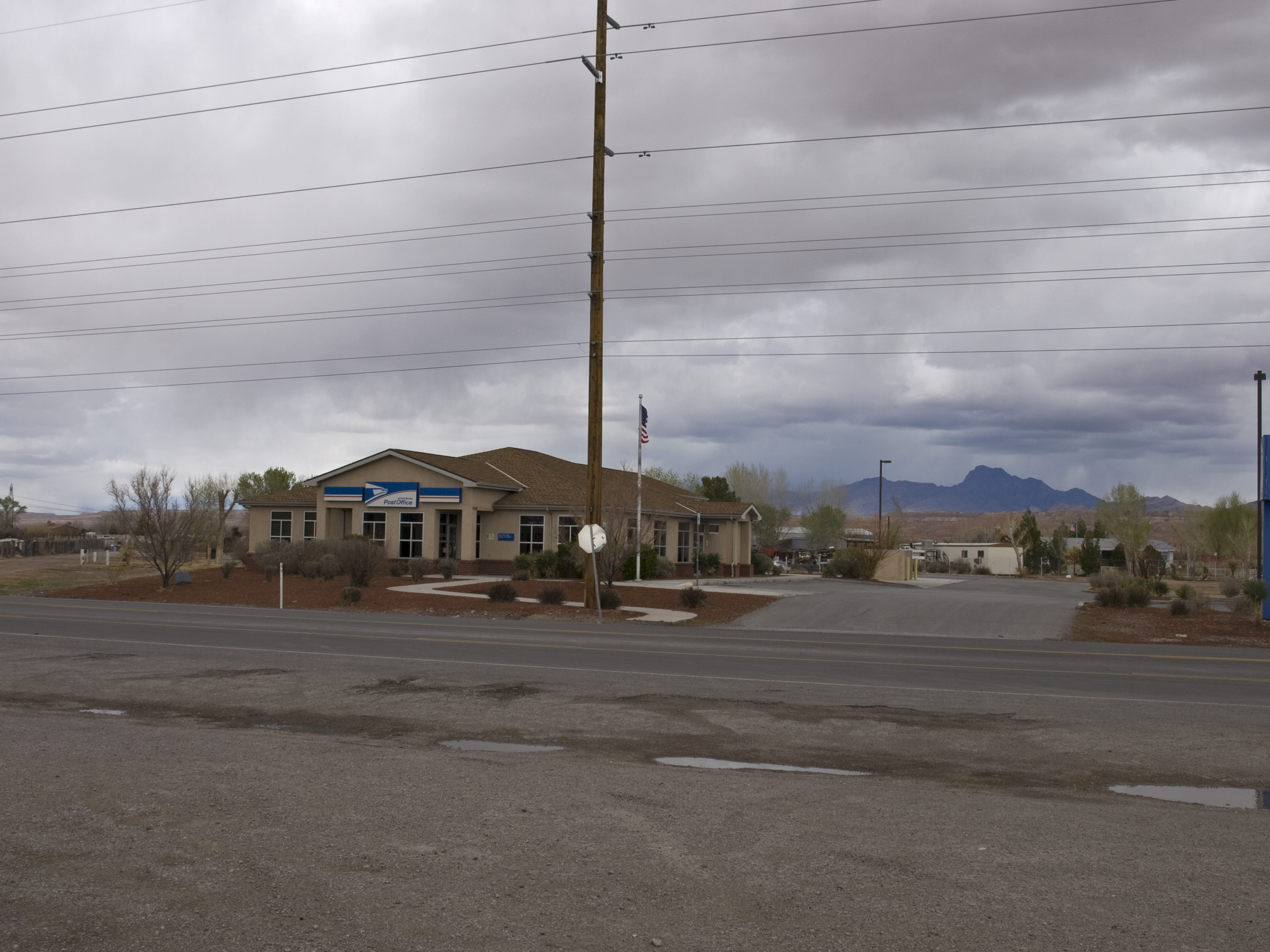
- Moapa US Post Office

- Location of Moapa in Clark County, Nevada

- Location in the United States
- Coordinates: 36°41′31″N 114°36′29″W
- Country: United States
- State: Nevada
- County: Clark

Area
  - Total: 17.85 sq mi (46.24 km^{2})
  - Land: 17.85 sq mi (46.24 km^{2})
  - Water: 0 sq mi (0.00 km^{2})
- Elevation: 1,611 ft (491 m)

Population (2020)
  - Total: 1,006
  - Density: 56.4/sq mi (21.76/km^{2})
- Time zone: UTC−8 (PST)
  - Summer (DST): UTC−7 (PDT)
- ZIP Code: 89025
- Area codes: 702 and 725
- FIPS code: 32-47840
- GNIS feature ID: 1852656
- Website: Advisory board homepage

Moapa is an unincorporated town and census-designated place (CDP) in Clark County, Nevada, United States. The population was 1,025 at the 2010 census. Both the second and the third tallest structures in Nevada, the Moapa Entravision Tower and the Moapa Kemp Tower respectively, are located in Moapa.

== History ==
The first permanent settlement at Moapa was made in 1865.

Two Hal Roach short silent comedies were filmed here: Black Cyclone in 1925 and Flying Elephants with Laurel and Hardy in 1927. Moapa was the site of a wildfire that began on July 1, 2010. The fire covered at least 680 acres (280 ha) and destroyed at least 15 buildings, largely in the Warm Springs Ranch.

== Geography ==
According to the United States Census Bureau, the CDP has a total area of 150.8 square miles (390.5 km^{2}), all land.

== Demographics ==
Historical population
Census	Pop.	Note	%±
2000	928		—
2010	1,025		10.5%
2020	1,006		−1.9%
U.S. Decennial Census

As of the 2000 census, there were 928 people, 273 households, and 220 families residing in the CDP. The population density was 6.2 inhabitants per square mile (2.4/km^{2}). There were 310 housing units at an average density of 2.1 per square mile (0.81/km^{2}). The racial makeup of the CDP was 62.93% White, 0.22% African American, 1.40% Native American, 1.83% Asian, 0.65% Pacific Islander, 30.50% from other races, and 2.48% from two or more races. Hispanic or Latino of any race were 35.02% of the population.

There were 273 households, out of which 51.3% had children under the age of 18 living with them, 65.9% were married couples living together, 9.9% had a female householder with no husband present, and 19.4% were non-families. Of all households, 14.7% were made up of individuals, and 4.4% had someone living alone who was 65 years of age or older. The average household size was 3.40 and the average family size was 3.81.

In the CDP, the population was spread out, with 38.8% under the age of 18, 7.7% from 18 to 24, 26.8% from 25 to 44, 19.5% from 45 to 64, and 7.2% who were 65 years of age or older. The median age was 29 years. For every 100 females, there were 106.7 males. For every 100 females age 18 and over, there were 100.7 males.

The median income for a household in the CDP was $48,365, and the median income for a family was $49,327. Males had a median income of $38,929 versus $20,990 for females. The per capita income for the CDP was $17,587. About 1.7% of families and 3.1% of the population were below the poverty line, including 3.2% of those under age 18 and none of those age 65 or over.

== Education ==
Moapa has a public library, a branch of the Las Vegas-Clark County Library District.

== Infrastructure ==
Lying within Moapa is the second tallest structure in Nevada, the 1,400-foot (430 m) Moapa Entravision Tower, located at the coordinates 36°36′3.5″ N, 114°35′9.1″ W.

The community was home to Reid Gardner Generating Station, a major coal-fired power plant which had been jointly owned by NV Energy and the California Department of Water Resources. Three units of this plant shut down in 2014, and the remaining unit shut down in 2017. The site has since been redeveloped into the Reid Gardner Battery Energy Storage System, wholly owned by NV Energy.
