= Ely Shoshone Indian Reservation =

Coordinates: 39°14′12″N 114°52′12″W

- Indian reservation
- Location of the Ely Shoshone Indian Reservation in Nevada
- Tribe: Ely Shoshone Tribe of Nevada
- Country: United States
- State: Nevada
- County: White Pine

Area
  - Total: 0.4249 km^{2} (0.1641 sq mi)
- Website: Ely Shoshone Tribe

The Ely Shoshone Indian Reservation is an Indian reservation for the Ely Shoshone Tribe of Nevada, Shoshone people, in and near the south side of the city of Ely in south-central White Pine County, Nevada. In 2005 it had a population of around 500, a textile business, and its own court system. The reservation is quite small, with a land area of only 104.99 acres (0.4249 km^{2}) and a 2000 census official resident population of 133 persons. Part of the city of Ely lies within its territory.
