= Harry Allen Generating Station =

Power station in Nevada, United States

- Country: United States
- Location: Clark County, near North Las Vegas, Nevada
- Coordinates: 36°25′48″N 114°54′4″W
- Status: Operational
- Commission date: 1995; 31 years ago
- Owner: NV Energy

Thermal power station
- Primary fuel: Natural gas
- Combined cycle?: Yes

Power generation
- Units operational: 2 X 72 MW; 484 MW system
- Nameplate capacity: 628 MW

The Harry Allen Generating Station is a 628-megawatt (842,000 hp) natural gas fired combined cycle power plant located in Clark County, Nevada about 30 mi (48 km) north of Las Vegas. Electricity is generated by two GE Frame 7EA combustion turbines, two GE Frame 7FA+e combustion turbines, and a D11 steam turbine.

== History ==
The initial facility consisting of a single 72mw GE Frame 7EA simple cycle gas turbine was completed in 1995. The station was originally planned to be operated mostly during hotter periods when demand would be the highest. A second similar unit was added in 2006

In 2011, a 484mw combined cycle facility was completed consisting of two GE Frame 7FA+E gas turbines with the exhaust heat from both units captured to produce steam for a GE D11 steam turbine to generate additional electricity

== Facility ==
Due to its location in a desert where water is limited, the combined cycle plant utilizes a six-story-high dry cooling system. Operating similar to a massive automotive radiator, thirty-six 36-foot (11 m) diameter fans are used to help cool and condense steam back in to water. The dry cooling system allows the combined cycle facility to operate with just 7% of the water normally used by conventional water cooled plants of similar rating. The facility also utilizes a waste water reclamation system that recaptures and recycles approximately 75 % of the water used in the power generating process
