= NV Energy =

Public utility in the United States

NV Energy, Inc.
- Company type: Subsidiary
- Industry: Public utilities
- Founded: Reno, Nevada, United States (1928)
- Headquarters: 6226 West Sahara Avenue Las Vegas, Nevada, United States
- Key people: Brandon Barkhuff (President and CEO)
- Products: Electricity, natural gas
- Revenue: US$ 4.5 billion (2025)
- Operating income: US$ 755 million (2017)
- Net income: US$ 2.87 billion (2023)
- Total assets: US$ 13.49 billion (2023)
- Owner: Berkshire Hathaway (100%)
- Number of employees: c. 2,700
- Parent: Berkshire Hathaway Energy
- Website: nvenergy.com

NV Energy is a investor-owned public utility which generates, transmits and distributes electric service in northern and southern Nevada, including the Las Vegas Valley, and provides natural gas service in the Reno – Sparks metropolitan area of northern Nevada. Based in Las Vegas, Nevada, it serves about 1. 3 million customers and over 40 million tourists annually.

MidAmerican Energy Holdings Company (now Berkshire Hathaway Energy), a subsidiary of Berkshire Hathaway, acquired NV Energy in a transaction completed on December 19, 2013. When the merger was announced, the companies stated that NV Energy would continue to be based in Las Vegas under its then-current name. Prior to the acquisition by MidAmerican, the company's common stock was listed on the New York Stock Exchange under the ticker symbol NVE.

== History ==
NV Energy is the product of the 1998 merger of the two major utilities in Nevada—northern Nevada's Sierra Pacific Power based in Reno and Las Vegas' Nevada Power.

Sierra Pacific Power was founded in 1928 from a merger of several companies dating back to the gold rush of the 1850s. In 1984, it reorganized as a holding company, Sierra Pacific Resources. Nevada Power was formed in 1906 as the Consolidated Power and Telephone Company of Nevada. It sold off its telephone operations in 1929 and became Southern Nevada Power, changing its name to Nevada Power in 1961. A year later, it became the first Nevada-based company listed on the New York Stock Exchange.

In 1999, Sierra Pacific and Nevada Power merged. Sierra Pacific Resources was the nominal survivor, with Nevada Power joining Sierra Pacific Power as one of its operating companies. However, headquarters moved from Reno to Nevada Power's old campus in Las Vegas. The merger created a company with a service territory stretching over 44, 400 square miles—nearly all of Nevada's densely populated area.

On September 22, 2008, Nevada Power and Sierra Pacific Power began doing business as NV Energy. This is the result of the corporate decision to unify its image under a single brand. Later, Sierra Pacific Resources changed its corporate name to NV Energy, Inc.

In 2009, NV Energy sold its California operations to a partnership of Algonquin Power & Utilities and Emera. Algonquin later bought out Emera. In February 2010, NV Energy entered a 20-year agreement with Pattern Energy to be the sole purchaser of power generated by Pattern's Spring Valley Wind Farm, which opened in August 2012. The wind farm generates power for NV Energy customers in northern Nevada and the Las Vegas Valley.

In July 2018, NV Energy launched an electric vehicle infrastructure program. The Nevada Public Utilities Commission authorized the company to invest $15 million to incentivize the development of publicly available charging stations. The program was authorized by the state legislature (Senate Bill 145) and "integrated with a broad, years-old $295 million legislative mandate that includes solar incentives and other renewables. "

== Service reliability ==
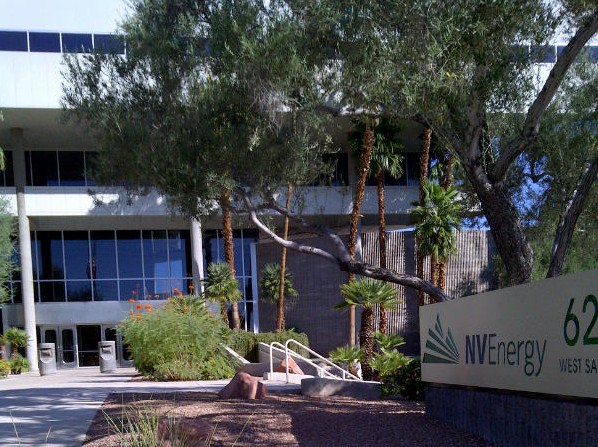
Entrance to NV Energy corporate headquarters

Based on the reliability of electric distribution service, NV Energy ranked among the best 10% of electric utilities nationwide in 2012, 2011 and 2010, and was the best in the nation in 2009. The rankings are based on interruption frequency and interruption duration compared to a peer group constructed by the Edison Electric Institute.

== Electric sources ==
The company serves its customers through a variety of sources including company-owned power plants (most of which are fueled by natural gas), purchased power and renewable energy. The company is currently exceeding Nevada's renewable portfolio standard, of 18 percent of its total energy sales. NV Energy's northern Nevada operating company achieved a 33. 6 percent renewable energy and renewable energy credit level, and southern Nevada achieved a 20. 2 percent renewable portfolio standard.

In April 2019, the Nevada legislature passed a bill that requires 50% of electricity in the state to be generated from renewable resources by 2030. The bill also sets a goal of 100% carbon-free generation resources by 2050. The new law applies to all electricity providers, including cooperatives and power marketers.

== Solar energy ==
NV Energy buys power from the 100 MW Playa Solar 2 project at $0. 0378/kWh under a 20-year power purchase agreement.

In 2018, NV Energy announced plans to purchase power from the Eagle Shadow Mountain Solar Project, a 300 MW solar photovoltaic project which is being developed by Avantus.

In June 2019, NV Energy announced three new solar power projects with total generating capacity of 1, 200 MW paired with 590 MW of battery storage. The projects will be developed by 8minute Solar Energy, EDFG Renewables, Quinbrook Infrastructure and Arevia Power, and are set to be completed by 2023. They consist of:

- Arrow Canyon Solar Project (200 MW);
- Southern Bighorn Solar & Storage Center (300 MW), and
- Gemini Solar + Battery Storage Project, $1. 9 billion. 690 MW of generating capacity and a 380 MW / 1, 400 MWh battery, at $38. 44/MWh.

== Other projects ==
In 2006, the company announced plans to construct the Ely Energy Center near Ely, Nevada but was delayed for approximately 10 years in February 2009.

In May 2011, the company completed construction of the Harry Allen gas-fired generating plant below budget and ahead of schedule.

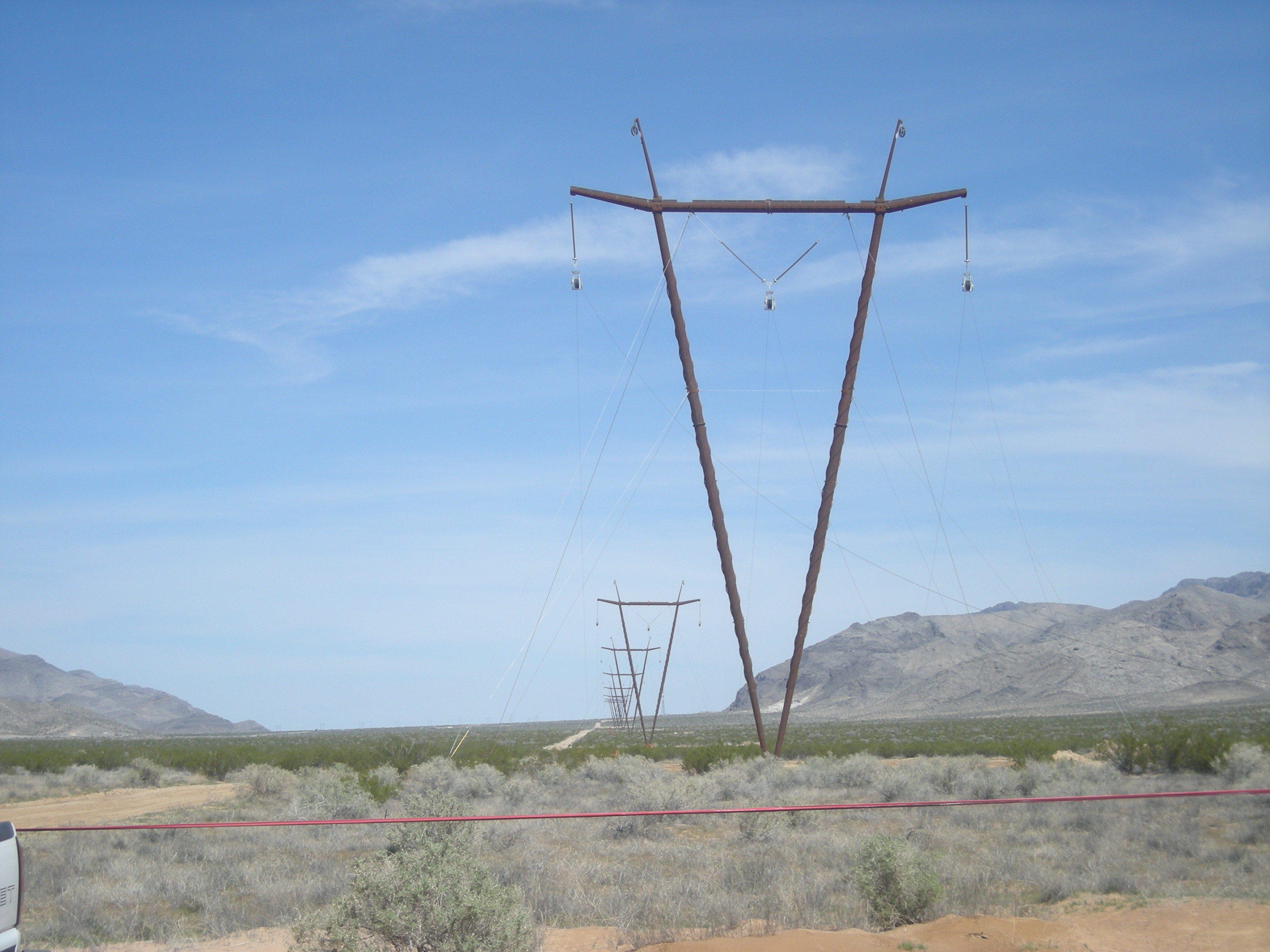
NV Energy's One Nevada (ON) Line

Prior to 2013, the company's northern and southern Nevada electric grids were not connected, and ran as separate systems. This changed in late 2013, when the company completed a transmission line running from the Harry Allen plant north to Ely, Nevada. The 500-kilovolt One Nevada Transmission Line (ONLine) is expected to improve electric service reliability, reduce costs and allow development of renewable energy sources, such as wind, solar and geothermal generating units, in remote parts of the state.

== "Energy Choice" initiative ==
In 2016 and 2018, Nevada voters considered a proposal to establish a competitive retail energy market in the state in place of the traditional one-utility model. Voters ultimately rejected that proposal in the 2018 election. Nevertheless, six major commercial customers left NV Energy's system during 2016 through 2018 and began buying power from other sources, exercising their right to do so under a 2001 state law.

== Subsidiaries ==
- Nevada Power Company
- Sierra Pacific Power Company
