= List of power stations in Nevada =

Sources of Nevada electricity generation in gigawatt-hours, full-year 2025:
1. Natural gas: 22,866 (50.5%)
2. Solar: 13,640 (30.1%)
3. Geothermal: 3,875 (8.56%)
4. Coal: 2,589 (5.72%)
5. Hydroelectric: 1,885 (4.16%)
6. Wind: 351 (0.78%)
7. Biomass: 54 (0.12%)

This is a list of electricity-generating power stations in the U.S. state of Nevada, sorted by type and name. In 2024, Nevada had a total summer capacity of 16.7 GW through all of its power plants, and a net generation of 45,528 GWh. In 2025, the electrical energy generation mix was 50.5% natural gas, 30.1% solar, 8.6% geothermal, 5.7% coal, 4.2% hydroelectric, 0.8% wind, and 0.1% biomass.

Small-scale solar including customer-owned photovoltaic panels delivered an additional net 2,272 GWh to Nevada's electricity grid in 2025. This was about six times smaller than the amount generated by the state's utility-scale PV plants. Nevada ranks second in the nation as a producer of geothermal resources, and fourth as a producer of solar resources.

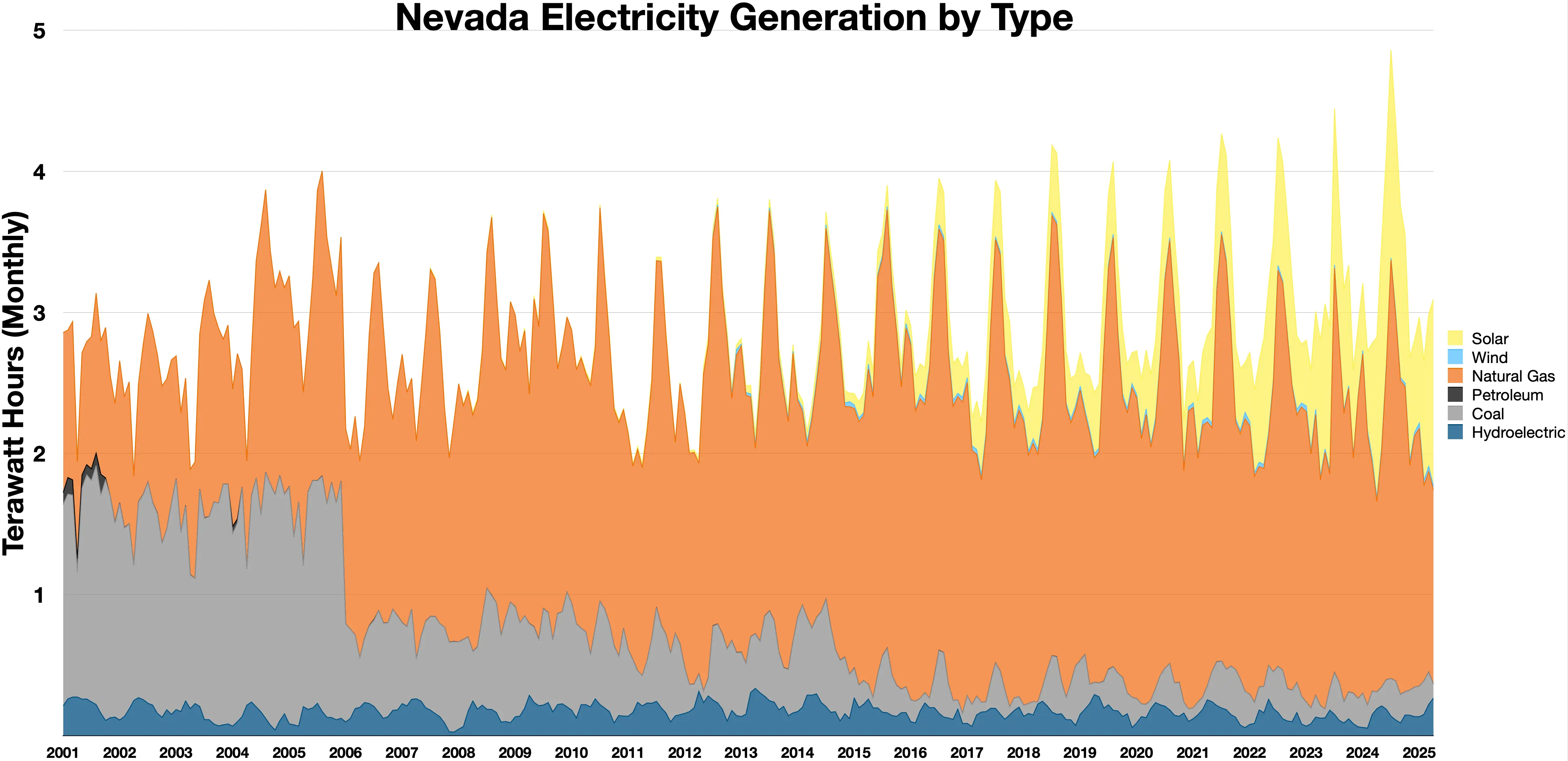
Nevada electricity generation by type

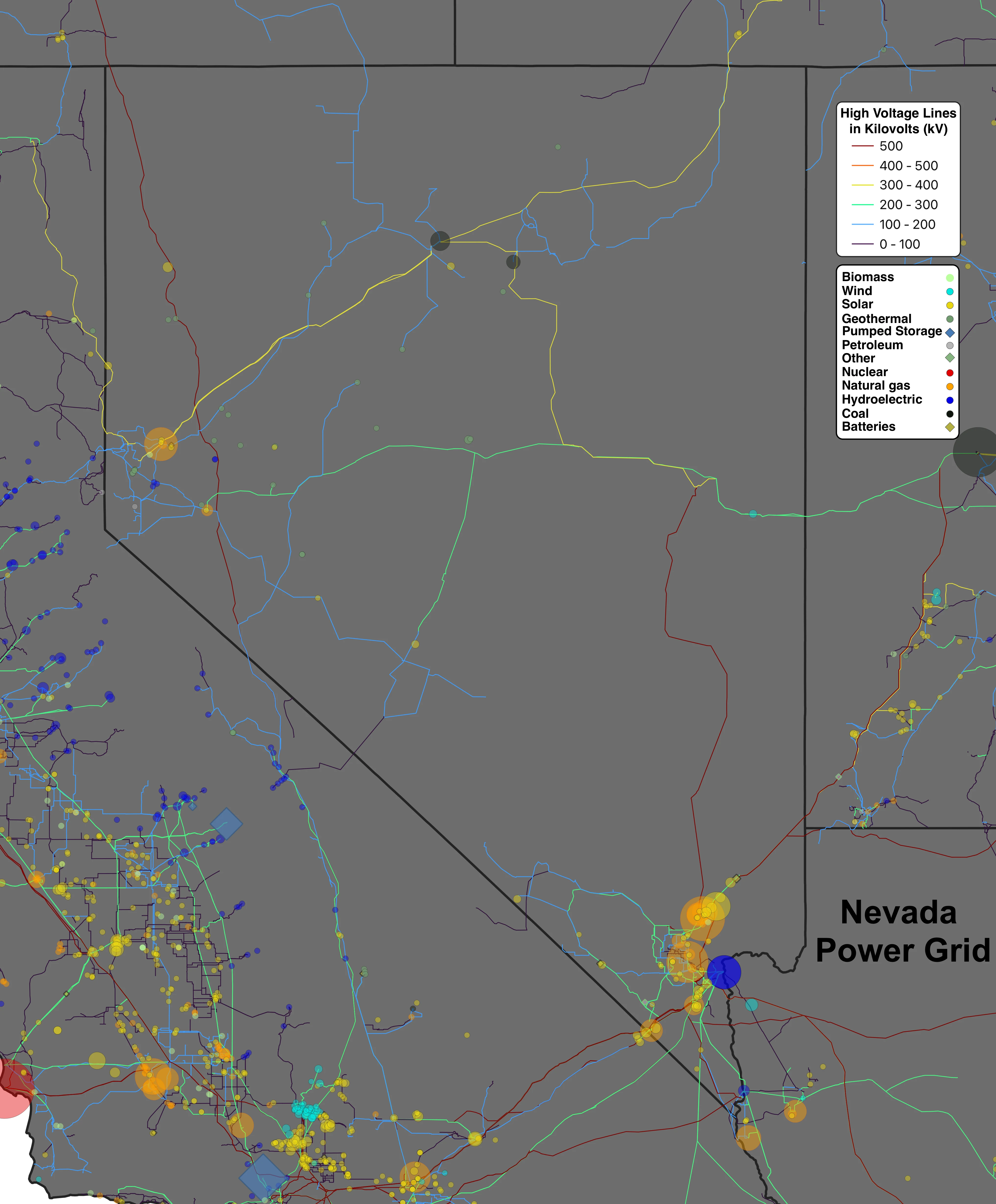
Nevada power grid

== Fossil-fuel power stations ==
Data from the U.S. Energy Information Administration serves as a general reference.

=== Coal ===
Name	Location	Coordinates	Capacity (MW)	Operator	Year opened	Scheduled retirement	Ref
North Valmy Generating Station	Humboldt County	40°52′50″N 117°09′08″W	522	NV Energy	1981 (Unit 1); 1985 (Unit 2)	2021 (Unit 1); 2023 (Unit 2)	
Reid Gardner Generating Station	Clark County	36°39′22″N 114°37′58″W	557	NV Energy	1965 (Unit 1); 1968 (Unit 2); 1976 (Unit 3); 1983 (Unit 4)	2014 (Unit 1); 2014 (Unit 2); 2014 (Unit 3); 2017 (Unit 4); Demolished in 2019	
TS Power Plant	Eureka County	40°44′48″N 116°31′42″W	242	Nevada Gold Mines	2008	2022 convert to ng	

Cancelled facilities:

- Ely Energy Center: 1,500–2,500 MW
- White Pine Energy Station: 1,590 MW

=== Natural gas ===
Name	Location	Coordinates	Capacity (MW)	Generation type	Operator	Year opened	Note	Ref
Apex Generating Station	Clark County	36.4160°N 114.9609°W	525	2×1 combined cycle	Southern California Public Power Authority	2003		
Black Mountain (Nevada Cogen. Assoc. #2)	Clark County	36.2253°N 114.8783°W	85	3×1 combined cycle	Northern Star Generation	1992		
Chuck Lenzie Generating Station	Clark County	36.3837°N 114.9218°W	1,102	2×1 combined cycle (×2)	NV Energy	2006		
Desert Star Energy Center	Clark County	35.7889°N 114.9942°W	450	2×1 combined cycle	Sempra Energy	2000		
Edward W. Clark Generating Station	Clark County	36.0875°N 115.0507°W	1,103	2×1 combined cycle (×2), simple cycle (x13)	NV Energy	1973/ 1979–1982/ 1993–1994/ 2008		
Fort Churchill Generating Station	Lyon County	39.1281°N 119.1322°W	226	Steam turbine (×2)	NV Energy	1968/1971		
Frank A. Tracy Generating Station	Storey County	39.5625°N 119.5250°W	885	2×1 combined cycle, 1x1 combined cycle, simple cycle (x2), steam turbine	NV Energy	1974/1994/ 1996/2008		
Garnet Valley (Nevada Cogen. Assoc. #1)	Clark County	36.3432°N 114.9207°W	90	3×1 combined cycle	Northern Star Generation	1992		
Goodsprings Waste Heat Recovery Station	Clark County	35.8094°N 115.4114°W	5.0	ORC generator	NV Energy	2010	Waste heat from gas compressor station	
Harry Allen Generating Station	Clark County	36.4306°N 114.9024°W	628	2×1 combined cycle, simple cycle (x2)	NV Energy	1995/2006/ 2011		
Las Vegas Generating Station	Clark County	36.2319°N 115.1222°W	272	2×1 combined cycle (×2), 1×1 combined cycle	NV Energy	1974/1994/ 1996/2008		
Saguaro Power Plant	Clark County	36.0417°N 115.0117°W	101	2×1 combined cycle	Saguaro Power	1991		
Silverhawk Generating Station	Clark County	36.4078°N 114.9606°W	520	2×1 combined cycle	NV Energy	2004		
Sun Peak Generating Station	Clark County	36.1375°N 115.0339°W	210	Simple cycle (×3)	NV Energy	1991		
Walter M. Higgins Generating Station	Clark County	35.6139°N 115.3561°W	530	2×1 combined cycle	NV Energy	2004		

== Renewable power stations ==
Data from the U.S. Energy Information Administration serves as a general reference.

=== Battery Storage ===
Name	Location	Coordinates	Power Capacity (MW)	Energy Capacity (MWh)	Operator	Year opened	Note	Ref
Dodge Flat Solar Energy Center: Battery Storage	Washoe County	39°40′32.4″N 119°22′04.8″W	50	200	NextEra Energy	2022		
Gemini Solar + Storage	Clark County	36°28′04.08″N 114°48′21.6″W	380	1,400	Primergy, Quinbrook	2024		
Reid Gardner Battery Energy Storage System	Clark County	36.658714°N 114.634315°W	220	440	NV Energy	2023		

=== Biomass ===
Name	Location	Coordinates	Capacity (MW)	Generation type	Fuel	Operator	Year opened	Note	Ref
Clark County Landfill Energy	Clark County	36.3587°N 114.8748°W	12	Simple cycle (x2)	Landfill gas	DCO Energy	2012		
Waste Management Lockwood LFGTE	Washoe County	39.4933°N 119.6203°W	3.2	Reciprocating engine (x2)	Landfill gas	Waste Management	2012		

=== Geothermal ===
Name	Location	Coordinates	Capacity (MW)	Generation type	Operator	Year opened	Note	Ref
Beowawe	Lander County	40.5547°N 116.6175°W	17.7	Flash steam	Terra-Gen Power	1985		
Beowawe 2	Lander County	40.5548°N 116.6174°W	1.5	Binary	Terra-Gen Power	2011		
Blue Mountain	Humboldt County	40.9961°N 118.1414°W	50	Binary (x3)	Altarock	2009		
Brady Hot Springs	Churchill County	39.7960°N 119.0100°W	26.1	Binary (x2)	Ormat	2002/2018		
Desert Peak	Lyon County	39.7540°N 118.9535°W	25	Binary (x2)	Ormat	2006		
Dixie Valley	Churchill County	39.9663°N 117.8557°W	67	Flash steam	Terra-Gen Power	1988		
Dixie Valley 2	Churchill County	39.9664°N 117.8558°W	6.2	Binary	Terra-Gen Power	2012		
Don Campbell 1	Mineral County	38.8367°N 118.3239°W	22.5	Binary	Ormat	2013		
Don Campbell 2	Mineral County	38.8358°N 118.3253°W	25	Binary	Ormat	2015		
Florida Canyon Mine	Pershing County	40.5781°N 118.2270°W	0.1	Binary	ElectraTherm	2012		
Galena II	Washoe County	39.3732°N 119.7645°W	13	Binary	Ormat	2007		
Galena III	Washoe County	39.3887°N 119.7489°W	26.5	Binary (x2)	Ormat	2008		
Jersey Valley	Pershing County	40.1808°N 117.4739°W	22.5	Binary (x2)	Ormat	2010		
McGinness Hills 1	Lander County	39.5911°N 116.9119°W	45	Binary (x3)	Ormat	2012		
McGinness Hills 2	Lander County	39.5912°N 116.9118°W	45	Binary (x3)	Ormat	2015		
McGinness Hills 3	Lander County	39.5963°N 116.8942°W	69	Binary (x2)	Ormat	2018/2021		
Patua	Churchill County	39.5858°N 119.0735°W	21	Binary (x3)	Cyrq	2013	Geothermal-solar hybrid	
Richard Burdett	Washoe County	39.3908°N 119.7546°W	26	Binary (x2)	Ormat	2005		
Salt Wells	Churchill County	39.2944°N 118.5725°W	23.6	Binary (x2)	Enel Green Power	2009		
San Emidio	Washoe County	40.3806°N 119.3997°W	11.8	Binary	U.S. Geothermal	1987/2012		
Soda Lake II	Churchill County	39.5570°N 118.8383°W	19.5	Binary (x6)	Cyrq	1991		
Soda Lake III	Churchill County	39.5545°N 118.8500°W	26	Binary	Cyrq	1987/2019		
Steamboat I	Washoe County	39.3939°N 119.7537°W	8.4	Binary	Ormat	1986		
Steamboat IA	Washoe County	39.3938°N 119.7538°W	2.4	Binary	Ormat	1988		
Steamboat II	Washoe County	39.3956°N 119.7468°W	13.4	Binary (x2)	Ormat	1992		
Steamboat III	Washoe County	39.3944°N 119.7475°W	13.4	Binary (x2)	Ormat	1992		
Steamboat Hills	Washoe County	39.3700°N 119.7669°W	84	Binary (x6)	Ormat	1988/2007/ 2020		
Stillwater	Churchill County	39.5475°N 118.5556°W	47.3	Binary (x4)	Enel Green Power	2009	Solar-geothermal hybrid	
Tungsten Mountain	Churchill County	39.6670°N 117.6937°W	24	Binary	Ormat	2017	Geothermal-solar hybrid	
Tuscarora	Elko County	41.4828°N 116.1511°W	32	Binary (x2)	Ormat	2012		
Wabuska (Whitegrass 1)	Lyon County	39.1633°N 119.1805°W	6.4	Binary (x4) (Kaishan)	Open Mountain; Energy	1984/1987/ 2018		

=== Hydroelectric ===
Name	Location	Coordinates	Capacity (MW)	Operator	Year opened	Note	Ref
Davis Dam	Clark County	35.1970°N 114.5707°W	251	United States Bureau of Reclamation	1951	Electricity generated in Arizona	
Fleish	Washoe County	39.481°N 119.992806°W	2.5	Truckee Meadows Water Authority	1905		
Hoover Dam	Clark County	36.0155°N 114.7380°W	2080^{[A]}	United States Bureau of Reclamation	1936-1938/ 1944/1961	Electricity generation split equally with Arizona	
Lahontan Dam	Churchill County	39.4625°N 119.0667°W	5.9	Truckee-Carson Irrigation District	1915/1989	4.0MW added 1989	
Verdi	Washoe County	39.523873°N 119.980624°W	2.3	Truckee Meadows Water Authority	1911		
Washoe (Mogul)	Washoe County	39.506237°N 119.934559°W	1.9	Truckee Meadows Water Authority	1904		

^{A} Total generating capacity of the 17 turbines at Hoover dam was derated to 1,596 MW in June 2014 due to persistently low water storage levels and projected further declines.

=== Solar photovoltaic ===
Active and finishing construction power plants
Name	Location	Coordinates	Capacity (MW_{AC})	Operator	PPA recipient	Year completed	Note	Ref
Apex Nevada Solar	North Las Vegas	36.3900°N 114.9700°W	20	SunEdison	NV Energy	2012		
Boulder Solar (I & II)	Boulder City	35.3480°N 114.9700°W	150	Sunpower	NV Energy	2016-2017		
Copper Mountain Solar Facility (I - V)	Boulder City	35.7822°N 114.9754°W	802	First Solar	Pacific Gas & Electric; Southern California Public Power Authority	2008-2021		
Eagle Shadow Mountain Solar Farm	Moapa River Indian Reservation	36.6298°N 114.6840°W	300	Capital Dynamics	NV Energy	2021		
Fort Churchill Solar Array	Lyon County	39.1281°N 119.1322°W	19.9	NV Energy	NV Energy	2015		
Gemini Solar	Clark County		690	Gemini Solar		2024	Coupled with 380MW/1,400MWh BESS	
Luning Solar Energy Center	Mineral County	38.5469°N 118.1916°W	50	Liberty Utilities	Liberty Utilities California	2017		
Mega Solar Array (Harry Allen Solar Energy)	Clark County		100	Invenergy	American Electric Power/MGM	2021		
Moapa Southern Paiute Solar Project	Moapa River Indian Reservation	36.5300°N 114.7703°W	250	First Solar	Los Angeles Department of Water and Power	2016		
Mountain View Solar	North Las Vegas	36.3906°N 114.9644°W	20	NextEra Energy Resources	NV Energy	2014		
Nellis AFB Solar Star	Clark County	36.2603°N 115.0544°W	14	TerraForm Power	U. S. Air Force (Nellis Air Force Base)	2007		
Nellis AFB Solar Array II	Clark County	36.2067°N 115.0477°W	15	Nevada Power Company	U. S. Air Force (Nellis Air Force Base)	2015		
NRG Solar	Las Vegas	36.1022°N 115.1695°W	6.5	MGM Resorts	MGM Resorts (rooftop solar)	2015		
Patua Solar	Churchill County	39.5857°N 119.0736°W	10.6	Cyrq	Sacramento Municipal Utility District	2017	Solar-geothermal hybrid	
Playa Solar (Switch Station)	Clark County	36.4080°N 114.9080°W	179	EDF Energy	NV Energy	2017		
River Mountains Solar	Las Vegas	36.0316°N 114.9294°W	14.4	TerraForm Power	Southern Nevada Water Authority	2016		
Searchlight Solar	Searchlight	35.4797°N 114.9361°W	17.5	Swinerton	NV Energy	2014		
Silver State North Solar Project	Primm	35.7931°N 115.3503°W	50	First Solar	NV Energy	2012		
Silver State South Solar Project	Primm	35.6300°N 115.3200°W	250	NextEra Energy Resources	Southern California Edison	2016		
Spectrum Nevada Solar	Clark County	36.2300°N 114.8700°W	30	Southern Power Company	NV Energy	2013		
Stillwater Solar (I & II)	Churchill County	39.5475°N 118.5556°W	42	Enel Green Power	NV Energy	2012/2018	Solar-geothermal hybrid	
Sunshine Valley Solar	Nye County	36.5180°N 116.4970°W	103.5	EDP Renewables, First Solar	Southern California Edison	2019		
Techren Solar Project (I - V)	Boulder City	35.8673°N 114.9564°W	400	Swinerton	Nevada Power Company, Sierra Pacific Resources	2019-2021		
Townsite Solar	Boulder City	35.9373°N 114.8840°W	180	Capital Dynamics	Western Area Power Administration	2021		
Tungsten Mountain	Washoe County	39.6670°N 117.6937°W	7.3	Ormat	Los Angeles Department of Water and Power; Southern California Public Power Authority	2019	Solar-geothermal hybrid	
Turquoise Liberty Solar	Washoe County	39.5900°N 119.5200°W	10	Liberty Utilities	NV Energy	2019		
Turquoise Solar	Washoe County	39.5740°N 119.5242°W	50	Greenbacker RE Corp.	NV Energy	2020		

As of February 2023, there are more than 30 proposed solar projects in Nevada. These have more than 20 GW of solar capacity and 17 GW of battery storage.

=== Solar thermal ===
Name	Location	Coordinates	Capacity (MW_{AC})	Operator	PPA recipient	Year completed	Note	Ref
Crescent Dunes Solar Energy Project	Nye County, Nevada	38.2389°N 117.3636°W	110	Tonopah Solar Energy, LLC (subsidiary of SolarReserve)	NV Energy	2015	Molten salt heat storage	
Nevada Solar One	Boulder City, Nevada	35.7998°N 114.9817°W	64	Acciona Solar Power	Nevada Power Company; Sierra Pacific Resources	2007		

=== Wind ===
Name	Location	Coordinates	Capacity (MW)	Number of turbines	Operator	Year opened	Ref
Spring Valley Wind Farm	White Pine County	39.1042°N 114.4922°W	152	66	NV Energy	2012	
