= Techren Solar Project =

Solar power plant located near Boulder City, Nevada

- Country: United States
- Location: Boulder City, Nevada
- Coordinates: 35°47′00″N 115°01′00″W
- Status: Operational
- Construction began: 2017 (TS1); 2018 (TS2)
- Commission date: March 2019 (TS1); September 2019 (TS2)
- Operator: Swinerton Renewable Energy

Solar farm
- Type: Flat-panel PV single-axis tracking
- Site area: 2,300 acres (930 ha)

Power generation
- Nameplate capacity: 400 MW_{AC}

The Techren Solar Project is a 400 megawatt (MW_{AC}) solar photovoltaic power plant near Boulder City, Nevada. Electricity production began with completion of the two building phases in 2019–2020. The project is co-located with several other large solar power projects in the Eldorado Valley.

== Project details ==
The project was originally founded and developed by SECP (Sustainable Energy Capital Partners) and further developed by 174 Power Global, the US subsidiary of the South Korean company, Hanwha Group. The project was constructed in two phases: the 100 MW Techren 1 began in 2017 and the 200 MW Techren 2 began in 2018.

Both units are built to a 1.5 kV_{dc} maximum system voltage standard. This increase from the previous 1.0 kV_{dc} standard enables the inverter to operate at higher efficiency and reliability, and is expected to reduce overall balance of system costs over the lifetime of the facility. Swinerton Renewable Energy was the EPC contractor, and Clenera provided asset management services. Project completion in September 2019 was as scheduled.

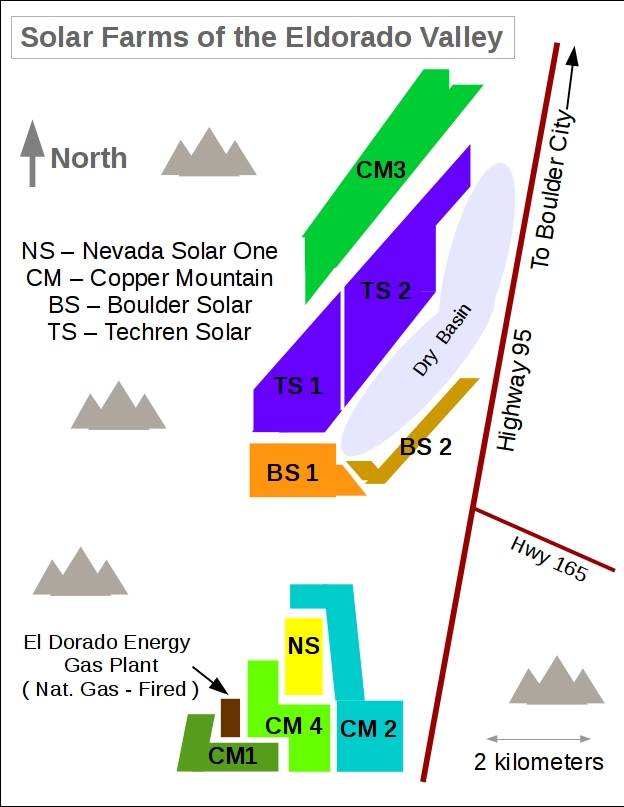
Map of solar farms in the Eldorado Valley

NV Energy is purchasing the electricity from both facilities, which are eligible for further customer participation under the NV GreenEnergy Rider opportunity. As with Boulder Solar and the Fort Churchill Solar Array, Apple Inc. helped to motivate the project through participation of its northern Nevada data centers in the program.

An additional 100 MW was developed: the 25 MW Techren 3, the 25 MW Techren 4 which were completed in October 2020, and the 50 MW Techren 5 completed in December 2020.

== See also ==
- Nevada Solar One
- Copper Mountain Solar
- List of photovoltaic power stations
- List of power stations in Nevada
- Solar power plants in the Mojave Desert
- Solar power in Nevada
