= Fort Churchill Solar Array =

Solar power station in Lyon County, Nevada

- Country: United States
- Location: Mason Valley, Yerington, Nevada
- Coordinates: 39°07′41″N 119°08′24″W
- Status: Operational
- Construction began: mid 2014
- Commission date: August 2015
- Owner: Apple Inc.
- Operator: NV Energy

Solar farm
- Type: CPV
- Site area: 137 acres (55 ha)

Power generation
- Units operational: 1248 SunPower C7 Gen2
- Nameplate capacity: 19.9 MW_{AC}
- Capacity factor: 18.6% (average 2016-2023)
- Annual net output: 32.4 GW·h, 236 MW·h/acre

The Fort Churchill Solar Array is a 19.9 megawatt (MW_{AC}) concentrator photovoltaics power station near the city of Yerington in Lyon County, Nevada. It is the largest assembly of SunPower C7 tracker low concentration PV (LCPV) technology in the United States. The facility was constructed for Apple Inc. to service its Reno Technology Park Data Center.

== Project details ==
The project occupies 137 acres adjacent to NV Energy's 226 MW natural gas-fueled Fort Churchill Generating Station in the Mason Valley. SunPower constructed the project using 1,248 of its second-generation, single-axis C7 tracker systems. The system reflects direct sunlight in order to concentrate it by a factor of seven onto high-efficiency (22.8% at 7x concentration) mono-crystalline silicon solar cells.

Apple initiated the project with Sunpower and NV Energy to supply its growing data center business in the state with 100% renewable energy. The resulting arrangement is unusual in that Apple owns the facility, leases it to NV Energy to operate and maintain under a 20-year contract, then repurchases the power through the NV GreenEnergy Rider opportunity.

== Electricity production ==
Generation (MW·h) of Fort Churchill Solar
Year	Jan	Feb	Mar	Apr	May	Jun	Jul	Aug	Sep	Oct	Nov	Dec	Total
2015					1978	2179	2018	1984	1830	1614	1537	1262	14,400
2016	1309	1654	2461	2595	3322	3344	3764	3673	3585	2974	2861	2301	33,843
2017	1517	1686	2910	3205	3586	3782	3659	4021	3790	3687	2402	2262	36,507
2018	1679	2154	2758	3444	3652	4265	3633	3674	3534	2771	2166	1677	35,407
2019	1920	2101	2906	3438	3644	4013	4053	3946	3373	3275	2235	1509	36,412
2020	2090	2639	2819	3324	3723	3994	4149	3725	3248	2944	2188	1807	36,650
2021	1606	2052	2595	3135	3462	3172	3049	3194	2824	2224	1814	1384	30,511
2022	1511	1828	2223	2602	2971	2823	2579	2368	2301	2071	1517	1123	25,915
2023	1003	1336	1537	2713	2869	3179	3836	2285	1885	1716	917	426	23,702
Average Annual Production for years 2016-2023 --->													32,368

== LCPV technology commercialization ==
SunPower's proprietary high-efficiency solar cell technology, marketed under the "Maxeon" trademark, was originally developed to meet the more rigorous demands of LCPV, despite ultimately having a much greater success in the flat-panel PV market in the U.S. Among the features, copper is deposited on the back of the cells to lower electrical and thermal resistances; thus mitigating the risks from concentrator "hotspots" and improving reliability. In late 2011, SunPower announced that its C7 concentrator system technology could reduce the levelized cost of electricity relative to competing 'utility-scale' PV installations available at the time by 20%.

In a strategic effort to achieve cost reductions at manufacturing scale - reductions similar to those rapidly being realized by commoditized PV using less efficient technology - SunPower entered a joint venture (JV) with the Chinese firm Tianjin Zhonghuan Semiconductor (TZS) to ramp-up LCPV production in late 2012. In early 2014, SunPower announced the supply of 70 MW of "concentrator cell assemblies" to the JV's first 50 MW production line in Inner Mongolia for the first of two projects totaling 120 MW to be completed by the end of 2015.

During the early 2015 completion of its Fort Churchill facility in the U.S., Apple announced its funding of another 40 MW of the JV's LCPV projects in China to support of its growing operations there with renewable energy. The JV was reported to have ramped to three 50 MW production lines at that time. Apple, SunPower, and Zhonghuan Energy (TZS's project development entity) indicated later in 2015 their intention to construct and jointly own an additional 170 MW of LCPV projects in northern China.

In August 2020, SunPower completed a split of its proprietary cell manufacturing and sales business into a separate company Maxeon Solar Technologies (NASDAQ:MAXN). TZS invested $298 million in the new entity and maintains close ties. Maxeon continues to manufacture and sell solar panel technology under the SunPower brand outside of the US and Canada.

== See also ==
- Boulder Solar
- Solar power in Nevada
- Solar power in the United States
