= Mountain View Solar Energy Project =

20 MW solar photovoltaic power plant

Mountain View Solar
- Country: United States
- Location: North Las Vegas
- Coordinates: 36°12′N 115°7′W
- Status: Operational
- Construction began: June 2013
- Commission date: January 2014
- Owner: NextEra Energy Resources

Solar farm
- Type: Flat-panel PV

Power generation
- Nameplate capacity: 20 MW

The Mountain View Solar Energy Project is a 20 MW solar photovoltaic power plant located in the Mountain View Industrial Park near North Las Vegas in Clark County, Nevada. All power generated by the nearly 84,000 modules is sold to NV Energy via a power purchase agreement. The plant is operated by Mountain View Solar, a subsidiary of NextEra Energy Resources

== See also ==
- Solar power in Nevada
- List of power stations in Nevada
