= Boulder Solar =

Photovoltaic power stations in the United States

Boulder Solar I/II
- Country: United States
- Location: Boulder City
- Coordinates: 35°50′12″N 114°58′28″W
- Status: Operational
- Commission date: December 2016 (BS1); January 2017 (BS2)
- Owners: Southern Power (BS1-51%); New Energy Solar (BS1-49%); American Electric Power (BS2)
- Operator: SunPower

Solar farm
- Type: Flat-panel PV single-axis tracking
- Site area: 900 acres (3.64 km^{2})

Power generation
- Nameplate capacity: 150 MW_{AC}
- Capacity factor: 30.9% (average 2017–2019)
- Annual net output: 407 GW·h, 452 MW·h/acre

The Boulder Solar project is a 150 megawatt (MW_{AC}) photovoltaic power station near Boulder City, Nevada. It was built in two phases by SunPower using its Oasis Power Plant system. The project is co-located with several other large solar power projects in the Eldorado Valley.

== Facility details ==
The 100 MW Boulder Solar 1 began construction on 600 acres in December 2015, and went online in mid-December 2016. It uses 288,000 tracker-mounted panels manufactured by SunPower. It has an expected annual production of about 280 GWh and will provide Boulder City with $20 million in land lease payments over the 20-year term.

Southern Power purchased a controlling (51%) interest in Boulder Solar 1 in November 2016. New Energy Solar purchased the remaining 49% interest in February 2018. The electricity is being sold to NV Energy under a 20-year power purchase agreement. Along with geothermal power and numerous smaller solar energy installations throughout the city, Boulder Solar 1 allowed Las Vegas to operate all municipal services with renewable energy sources starting at the end of 2016.

The 50 MW Boulder Solar 2, also constructed by SunPower, entered service in January 2017 with an expected annual production of 140 GWh. It is owned by American Electric Power and is also selling its electricity to NV Energy. Apple Inc. motivated this construction phase of the project through the participation of its northern Nevada data centers in the NV GreenEnergy Rider opportunity.

== Electricity production ==
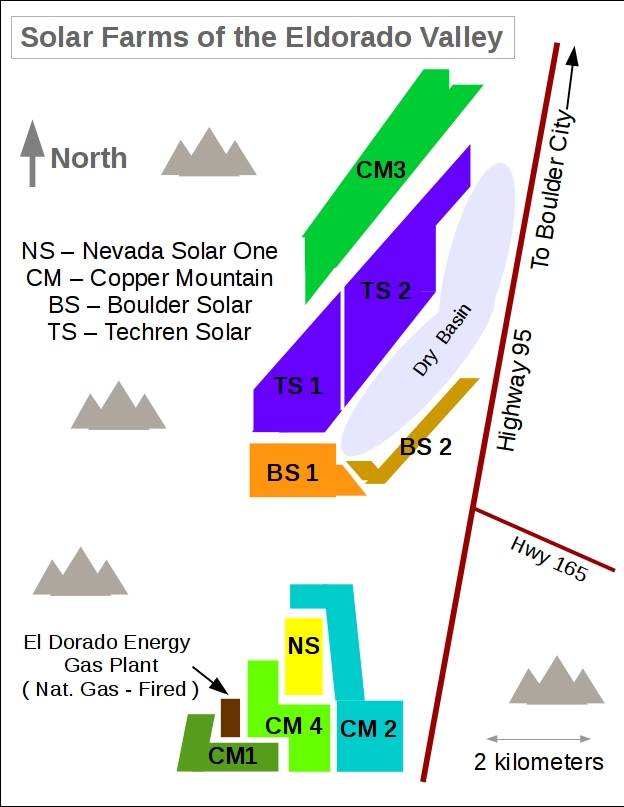
Map of solar farms in the Eldorado Valley

Total Facility Generation (Annual Sum from Both Units Below)
Year	Total Annual MW·h
2016	10,740
2017	405,214
2018	415,341
2019	399,324
2020	417,972
2021	389,826
2022	397,756
Average (2017–2022)	404,405

Generation (MW·h) of Boulder Solar 1 - 100 MW unit)
Year	Jan	Feb	Mar	Apr	May	Jun	Jul	Aug	Sep	Oct	Nov	Dec	Total
2016												10,740	10,740
2017	11,302	10,807	23,954	28,536	32,221	33,171	27,273	27,327	24,147	23,122	15,208	14,435	271,503
2018	14,653	17,350	22,677	28,887	31,586	33,857	28,388	26,658	26,169	20,714	16,626	12,538	280,103
2019	13,616	15,077	24,140	25,737	28,035	26,986	30,612	29,624	24,634	23,039	15,647	10,987	268,134
2020													281,229
2021													260,496
2022													267,761

Generation (MW·h) of Boulder Solar 2 - 50 MW unit)
Year	Jan	Feb	Mar	Apr	May	Jun	Jul	Aug	Sep	Oct	Nov	Dec	Total
2017	5,507	6,536	12,296	13,795	15,698	16,306	13,480	13,265	11,666	11,084	7,197	6,881	133,711
2018	7,079	8,146	11,006	14,014	15,311	16,522	13,923	12,723	12,656	9,902	7,959	5,997	135,238
2019	6,551	7,322	11,697	12,623	13,885	15,375	14,982	12,650	11,999	11,263	7,564	5,279	131,190
2020													136,743
2021													129,330
2022													130,085

== See also ==
- Nevada Solar One
- Copper Mountain Solar Facility
- Techren Solar Project
- Solar power in Nevada
- List of power stations in Nevada
