= Copper Mountain Solar Facility =

Solar power plant in Nevada, United States

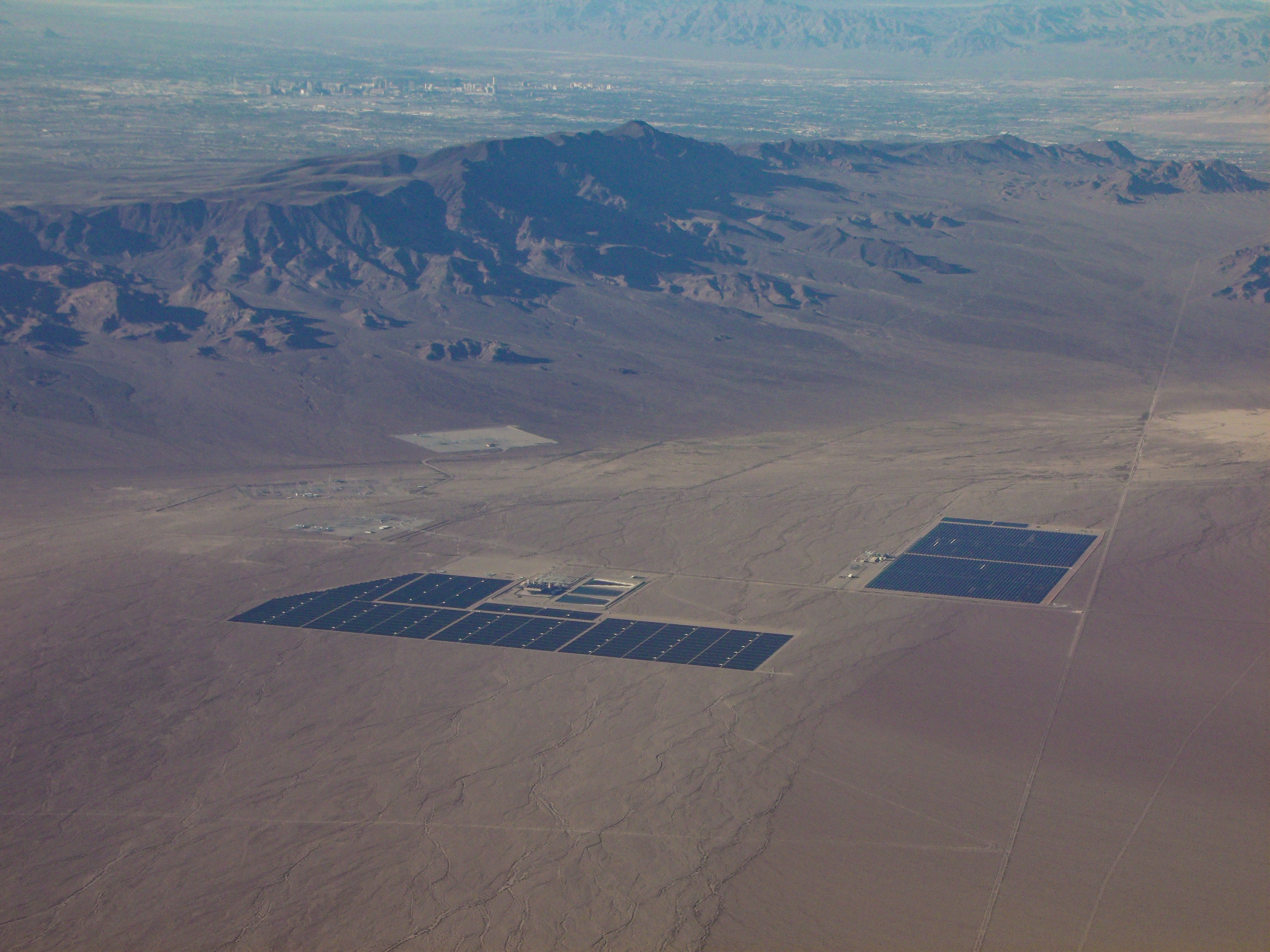
- Copper Mountain Solar 1 (at left)
- Country: United States
- Location: Boulder City, Nevada
- Coordinates: 35°47′00″N 114°59′30″W
- Status: Operational
- Construction began: January 2010
- Commission date: Dec 2008 - Mar 2021
- Owner: Sempra Generation

Solar farm
- Type: Flat-panel PV
- Site area: 4,000 acres (1,600 ha)

Power generation
- Units operational: 9 million First Solar panels
- Nameplate capacity: 802 MW_{AC}
- Capacity factor: 27.9% (average 2017-2019)
- Annual net output: 1,348 GW·h, 337 MW·h/acre

External links
- Commons: Related media on Commons

The Copper Mountain Solar Facility is a 802 megawatt (MW_{AC}) solar photovoltaic power plant in Boulder City, Nevada, United States. The plant was developed by Sempra Generation. When the first unit of the facility entered service on December 1, 2010, it was the largest photovoltaic plant in the U.S. at 58 MW. With the opening of Copper Mountain V in March 2021, it again became the largest in the United States. It is co-located with the 64 MW Nevada Solar One, 150 MW Boulder Solar, and 300 MW Techren Solar projects in the Eldorado Valley, thus forming a more than 1 gigawatt (GW) solar generating complex. By comparison, generating capacity at the nearby Hoover Dam is about 2 GW.

== History ==
=== First unit ===
Sempra Generation completed the 10 MW demonstration plant named El Dorado Solar near the existing El Dorado natural gas-fired power station and the Nevada Solar One concentrated solar power plant in December 2008. It was the company's first venture into utility-scale solar generation. A 48 MW second phase named Copper Mountain was constructed from January to December 2010 at a cost of about $141 million. At its construction peak more than 350 workers were installing the 775,000 First Solar panels on the 450-acre (180 ha) site. The power from the original 10 MW plant is sold to Pacific Gas & Electric under a separate 20-year power purchase agreement.

=== Second unit ===
Based on its successes with the first unit, a second 150 MW unit was approved adjacent to the site in late 2010 and a construction plan announced On August 4, 2011. The first 92 MW phase came online in January 2013, and the 58 MW expansion phase was eventually completed in early 2015.

=== Third unit ===
Construction on the third, and thus far largest, 250 MW unit began in 2013 and was completed in early 2015, with a formal dedication ceremony on 30 April 2015. This unit is located about 5 kilometres (3.1 miles) north of the prior grouping, and is capable of generating enough electricity to power about 80,000 homes.

=== Fourth unit ===
Copper Mountain Solar 4 is the fourth unit of the Copper Mountain Solar complex. Construction on the 94 MW unit, adjacent to the grouping of Units 1 and 2, commenced in 2015. It also sustained about 350 construction jobs at peak, and completed year-end 2016. In contrast to prior units, the rows of panels run north to south, with solar trackers tilting the rows from east to west in order to maximize energy production.

=== Fifth unit ===
The 250 MW Copper Mountain 5 unit went online in March 2021.

== Facility unit details ==
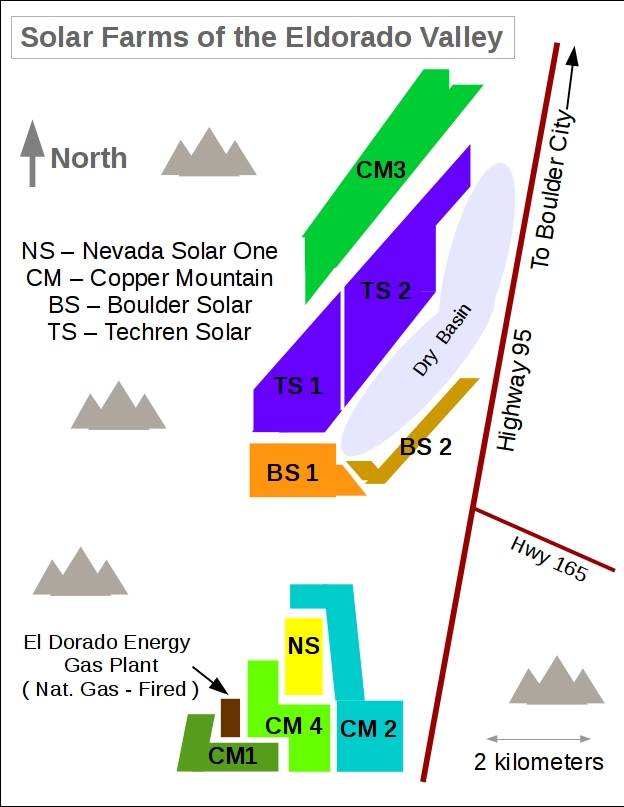
Map of solar farms in the Eldorado Valley

Copper Mountain Solar Facility
Unit	Capacity MW_{AC}	Complete Date	Coordinates	Owner	PPA Recipient	PPA Length
Unit 1 Pilot	10 MW	Dec 2008	35.78510632°N 114.99598468°W	Sempra U.S. Gas & Power	Pacific Gas & Electric	20yrs
Unit 1 Phase 2	48 MW	Dec 2010	35.77997069°N 114.99090615°W	Sempra U.S. Gas & Power	Pacific Gas & Electric	20yrs
Unit 2 Phase 1	92 MW	Dec 2012	35.78737752°N 114.96158993°W	Sempra U.S. Gas & Power & Consolidated Edison Development	Pacific Gas & Electric	25yrs
Unit 2 Phase 2	58 MW	Apr 2015	35.80803793°N 114.96732424°W	Sempra U.S. Gas & Power & Consolidated Edison Development	Pacific Gas & Electric	25yrs
Unit 3	250 MW	mid-2015	35.88979281°N 114.95674042°W	Sempra U.S. Gas & Power & Consolidated Edison Development	Southern California Public Power Authority	20yrs
Unit 4	94 MW	Dec 2016	35.78934926°N 114.98015631°W	Sempra U.S. Gas & Power	Southern California Edison (SCE)	20yrs (2020 start)
Unit 5	250 MW	Mar 2021		Consolidated Edison Development		

== Electricity production ==
Total Facility Generation (Annual Sum from All Units Below)
Year	Total Annual MW·h
2008	826
2009	21,661
2010	50,922
2011	129,590
2012	199,689
2013	352,561
2014	503,599
2015	1,078,497
2016	1,122,818
2017	1,342,662
2018	1,364,969
2019	1,336,619
Average (2017-2019)	1,348,083

Generation (MW·h) of Copper Mountain Solar 1 - CM10 subunit (10MW)
Year	Jan	Feb	Mar	Apr	May	Jun	Jul	Aug	Sep	Oct	Nov	Dec	Total
2008												826	826
2009	416	727	2,136	2,472	2,863	2,102	2,486	2,882	2,386	1,573	1,063	556	21,661
2010	299	554	1,367	1,746	2,474	2,920	2,256	2,845	2,652	1,606	1,529	898	21,146
2011	971	1,301	1,631	2,275	2,512	2,874	2,103	2,469	1,765	1,700	1,041	903	21,546
2012	556	726	1,048	1,619	2,373	2,451	2,172	2,132	2,426	2,356	1,909	1,477	21,245
2013	1,152	1,412	1,736	2,015	2,169	2,208	1,709	1,706	1,678	1,951	1,327	1,312	20,375
2014	973	1,017	1,466	1,545	1,828	2,096	1,835	1,995	2,066	2,093	1,779	1,177	19,869
2015	994	1,394	1,808	2,045	1,874	2,064	1,912	1,879	1,733	1,530	1,456	1,196	19,885
2016	626	3,662	1,177	1,241	1,589	1,600	1,801	1,757	1,715	1,423	1,369	1,101	19,061
2017	803	892	1,540	1,696	1,898	2,002	1,937	2,128	2,006	1,951	1,271	1,197	19,321
2018	930	1192	1,527	1,906	2,016	2,361	2,011	2,034	1,956	1,534	1,199	928	19,595
2019	1190	1302	1,800	2,130	2,258	2,487	2,511	2,445	2,090	2,029	1,385	935	22,562

Generation (MW·h) of Copper Mountain Solar 1 - CM48 subunit (48MW)
Year	Jan	Feb	Mar	Apr	May	Jun	Jul	Aug	Sep	Oct	Nov	Dec	Total
2010						1,690	2,412	3,918	4,305	5,394	6,670	5,387	29,776
2011	7,756	8,077	9,249	10,350	10,992	10,636	9,231	10,164	8,558	9,165	7,147	6,719	108,044
2012	7,564	7,486	9,414	9,668	11,081	10,638	9,422	9,029	9,507	9,180	7,320	6,069	106,378
2013	7,290	7,986	9,320	10,156	10,504	10,195	8,769	8,870	8,887	9,320	6,863	7,091	105,251
2014	7,355	7,125	9,633	9,796	10,454	10,131	8,784	9,171	9,146	8,988	7,672	5,201	103,456
2015	6,573	7,807	9,359	10,147	9,204	9,639	9,052	9,250	8,947	7,994	7,549	6,415	101,936
2016	5,915	8,338	8,933	8,619	8,696	9,651	9,963	9,157	9,028	7,993	6,329	5,669	98,291
2017	4,206	4,675	8,068	8,883	9,941	10,485	10,143	11,147	10,506	10,221	6,658	6,270	101,204
2018	4,754	6,097	7,809	9,749	10,310	12,075	10,285	10,400	10,004	7,843	6,131	4,746	100,205
2019	5,166	5,652	7,818	9,251	9,804	10,799	10,904	10,618	9,077	8,811	6,013	4,061	97,974

Generation (MW·h) of Copper Mountain Solar 2 (150MW)
Year	Jan	Feb	Mar	Apr	May	Jun	Jul	Aug	Sep	Oct	Nov	Dec	Total
2012							5,751	9,416	13,857	14,648	15,569	12,825	72,066
2013	15,532	16,971	19,879	21,460	22,276	22,448	19,450	19,402	19,397	20,112	14,949	15,059	226,935
2014	15,742	15,521	20,509	20,723	22,239	22,234	19,590	20,143	20,614	20,043	16,628	11,000	224,986
2015	15,813	22,847	32,606	35,639	33,533	35,903	34,065	34,143	32,696	29,524	28,180	19,300	354,249
2016	21,561	28,303	32,347	28,763	29,914	35,865	36,913	32,992	33,124	29,486	26,004	20,358	356,633
2017	15,226	16,922	29,206	32,157	35,988	37,955	36,720	40,351	38,032	37,002	24,103	22,699	365,361
2018	17,435	22,360	28,638	35,752	37,810	44,280	37,717	38,140	36,689	28,763	22,485	17,406	367,474
2019	18,873	20,650	28,565	33,798	35,821	39,453	39,840	38,793	33,164	32,193	21,969	14,836	357,955

Generation (MW·h) of Copper Mountain Solar 3 (250MW)
Year	Jan	Feb	Mar	Apr	May	Jun	Jul	Aug	Sep	Oct	Nov	Dec	Total
2014					3,789	11,030	14,733	20,025	23,153	30,470	29,671	22,417	155,288
2015	33,165	45,414	55,583	60,855	57,697	61,213	56,920	56,164	51,528	44,901	43,550	35,437	602,427
2016	33,304	49,489	53,820	53,388	62,617	62,240	60,812	57,121	53,930	47,424	40,083	31,626	605,854
2017	34,306	34,423	54,975	59,303	64,274	64,486	55,440	56,390	52,768	54,330	38,729	38,337	607,761
2018	37,913	42,311	51,664	59,515	62,897	64,859	57,551	56,242	56,140	48,832	42,398	33,544	613,866
2019	35,491	36,265	45,385	55,641	56,435	61,710	60,577	60,209	54,467	55,545	40,816	29,610	592,151

Generation (MW·h) of Copper Mountain Solar 4 (94MW with tracking)
Year	Jan	Feb	Mar	Apr	May	Jun	Jul	Aug	Sep	Oct	Nov	Dec	Total
2016									4,903	14,020	13,526	10,530	42,979
2017	10,349	11,502	19,851	21,857	24,461	25,798	24,958	27,427	25,851	25,150	16,383	15,428	249,015
2018	12,518	16,053	20,560	25,669	27,146	31,791	27,079	27,383	26,341	20,650	16,143	12,496	263,829
2019	14,023	15,344	21,225	25,114	26,617	29,316	29,603	28,826	24,642	23,921	16,324	11,024	265,977

== See also ==
- List of photovoltaic power stations
- List of power stations in Nevada
- Solar power in Nevada
- Solar power plants in the Mojave Desert
- Solar power in the United States
- Renewable energy in the United States
- Renewable portfolio standard
