= Solar power plants in the Mojave Desert =

Electricity-generation facilities in California

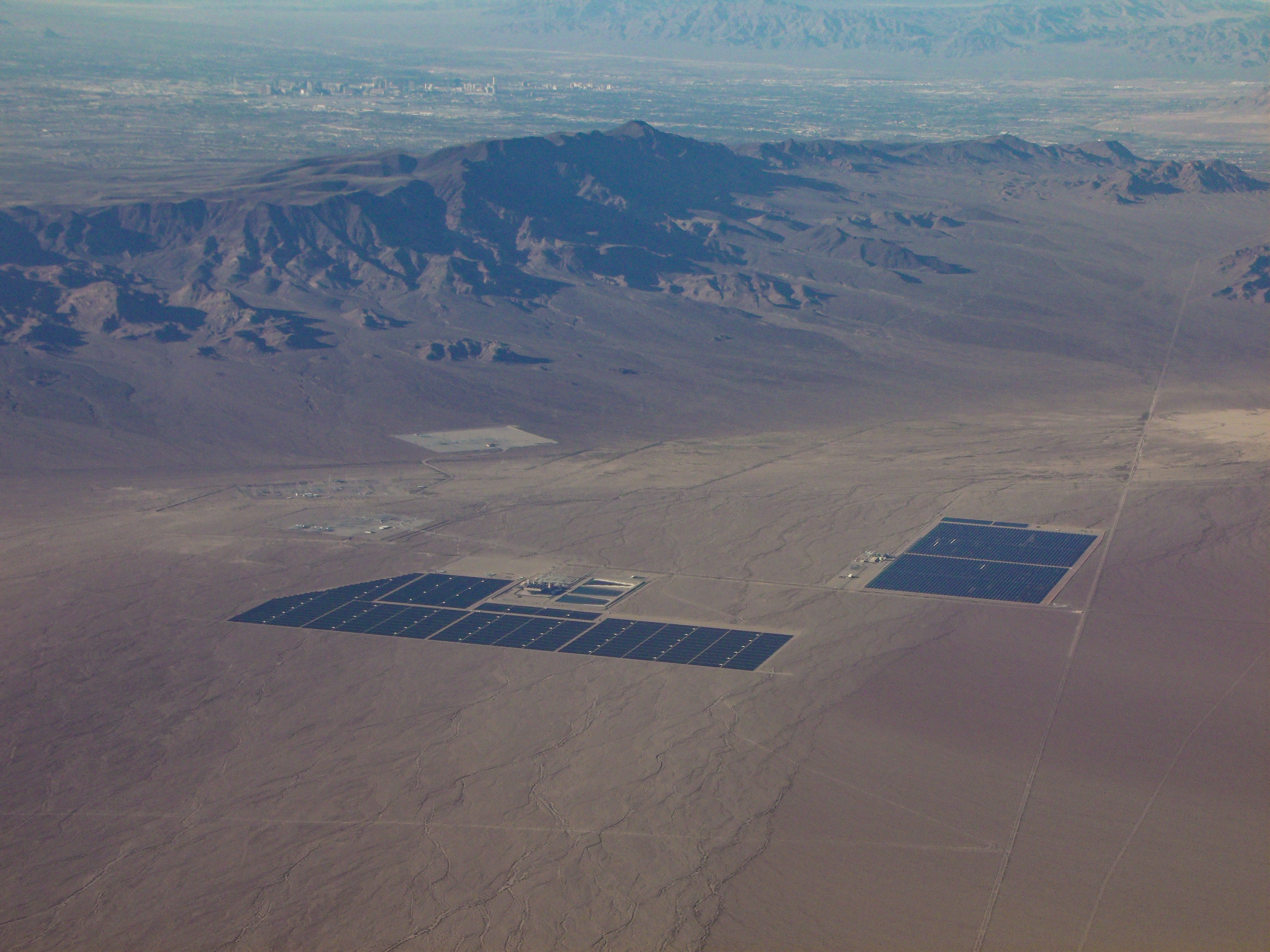
Nevada Solar One (at right), and Copper Mountain Solar 1 (at left)

There are several solar power plants in the Mojave Desert which supply power to the electricity grid. Insolation (solar radiation) in the Mojave Desert is among the best available in the United States, and some significant population centers are located in the area. These plants can generally be built in a few years because solar plants are built almost entirely with modular, readily available materials. Solar Energy Generating Systems (SEGS) is the name given to nine solar power plants in the Mojave Desert which were built in the 1980s, the first commercial solar plant. These plants have a combined capacity of 354 megawatts (MW) which made them the largest solar power installation in the world, until Ivanpah Solar Power Facility was finished in 2014.

Nevada Solar One is a solar thermal plant with a 64 MW generating capacity, located near Boulder City, Nevada. The Copper Mountain Solar Facility is a 150 MW photovoltaic power plant in Boulder City, Nevada. The Ivanpah Solar Power Facility is a 370 MW facility which consists of three separate solar thermal power plants just off interstate highway 15 on the Nevada-California border in the Mojave Desert. There are also plans to build other large solar plants in the Mojave Desert.

== Overview ==
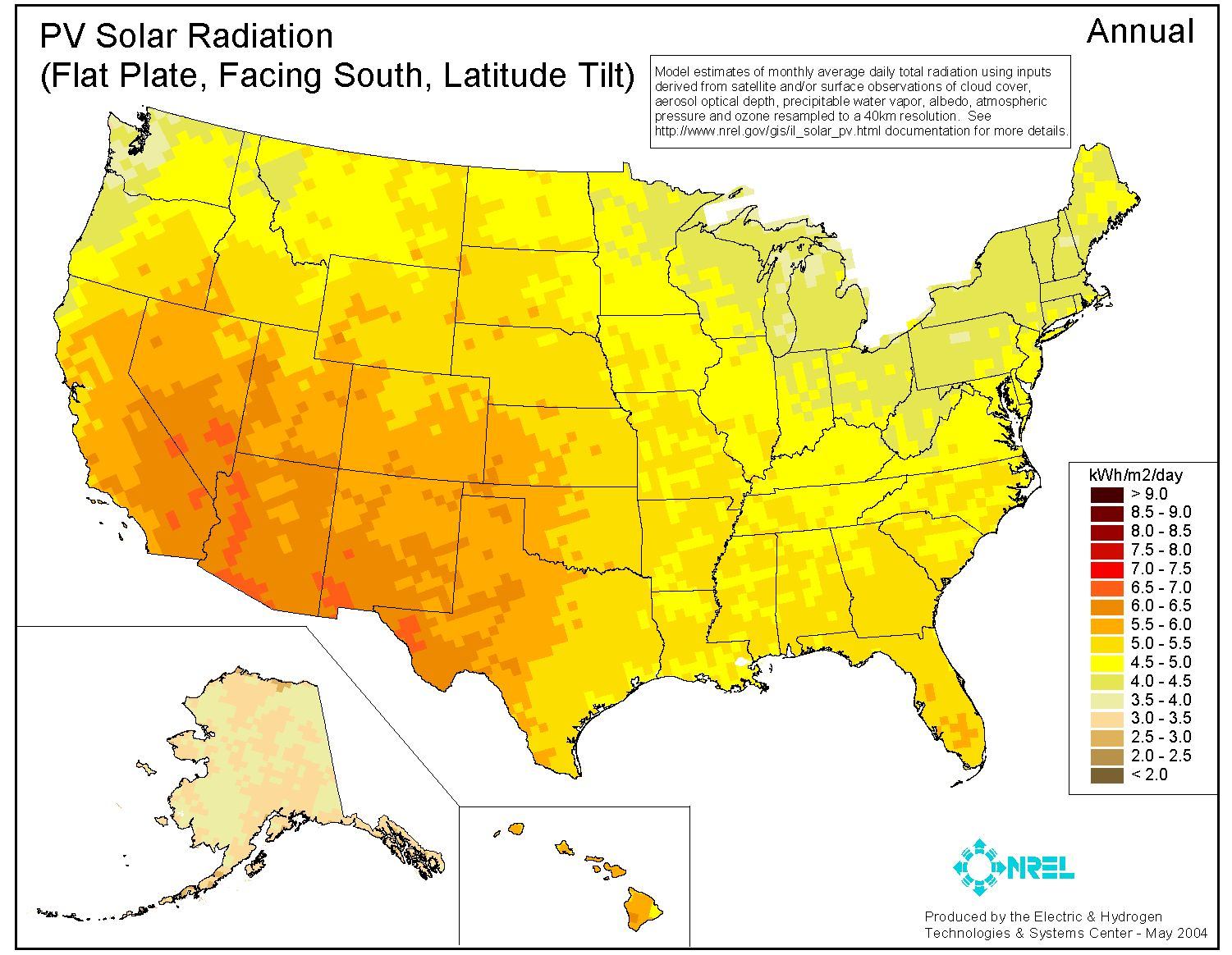
US annual average solar energy received by a latitude tilt photovoltaic cell (modeled).

Sketch of a Parabolic Trough Collector system

The Southwestern United States is one of the world's best areas for insolation, and the Mojave Desert receives up to twice the sunlight received in other regions of the country. This abundance of solar energy makes solar power plants a cleaner alternative to traditional power plants, which burn fossil fuels such as oil and coal. Solar power stations provide an environmentally benign source of energy, produce virtually no emissions, and consume no fuel other than sunlight. Some groups are also encouraging more distributed generation, or rooftop solar.

In 2008, solar electricity was not cost competitive with bulk, baseload power. However, it does provide electricity when and where power is most limited and most expensive, which is a strategic contribution. Solar electricity mitigates the risk of fuel-price volatility and improves grid reliability. Since then costs have decreased to make solar electricity increasingly competitive.

While many of the costs of fossil fuels are well known, others (pollution related health problems, environmental degradation, the impact on national security from relying on foreign energy sources) are indirect and difficult to calculate. These are traditionally external to the pricing system, and are thus often referred to as externalities. A corrective pricing mechanism, such as a carbon tax, could lead to renewable energy, such as solar thermal power, becoming cheaper to the consumer than fossil fuel based energy.

Solar thermal power plants can generally be built in a few years because solar plants are built almost entirely with modular, readily available materials. In contrast, many types of conventional power projects, especially coal and nuclear plants, require long lead times.

== Solar plants ==
=== Solar One and Solar Two ===
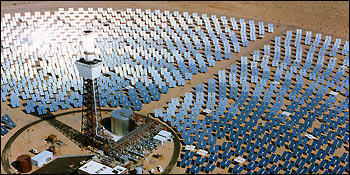
Aerial view of the Solar Two facility, showing the power tower (left) surrounded by the sun-tracking mirrors

Solar power towers use thousands of individual sun-tracking mirrors (called heliostats) to reflect solar energy onto a central receiver located on top of a tall tower. The receiver collects the sun's heat in a heat-transfer fluid that flows through the receiver. The U.S. Department of Energy, with a consortium of utilities and industry, built the first two large-scale, demonstration solar power towers in the desert near Barstow, California.

Solar One operated successfully from 1982 to 1988, proving that solar power towers work efficiently to produce utility-scale power from sunlight. The Solar One plant used water/steam as the heat-transfer fluid in the receiver; this presented several problems in terms of storage and continuous turbine operation. To address these problems, Solar One was upgraded to Solar Two, which operated from 1996 to 1999. Both systems had a 10 MW power capacity.

The unique feature of Solar Two was its use of molten salt to capture and store the sun's heat. The very hot salt was stored and used when needed to produce steam to drive a turbine/generator that produces electricity. The system operated smoothly through intermittent clouds and continued generating electricity long into the night. Solar Two was decommissioned in 1999, and was converted by the University of California, Davis, into CACTUS, an Air Cherenkov Telescope, in 2001, measuring gamma rays hitting the atmosphere.

=== Solar Energy Generating Systems ===
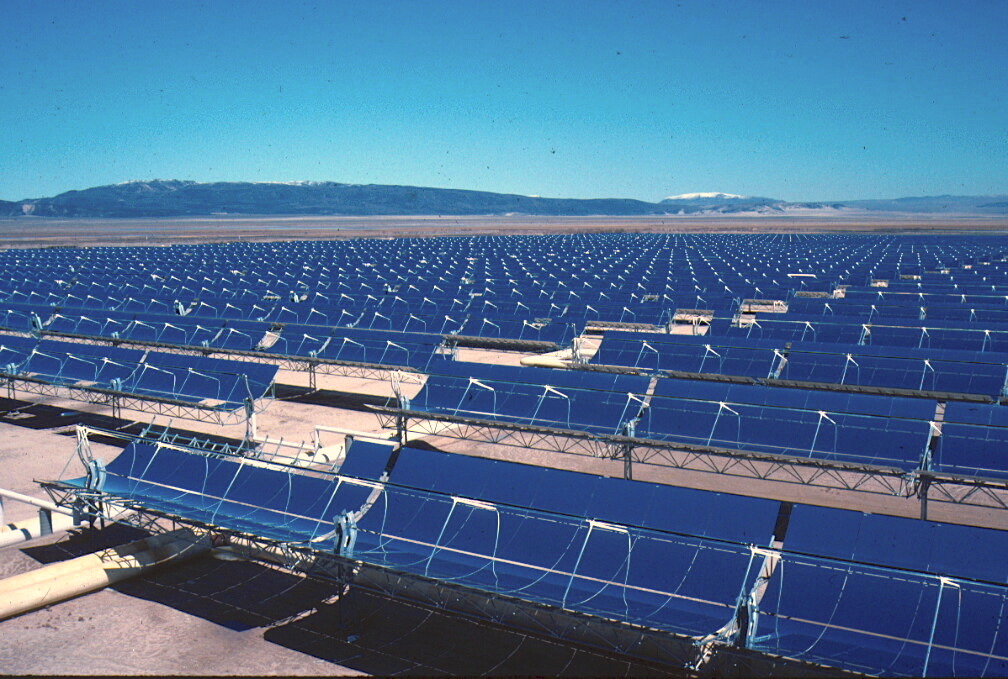
Part of the 354 MW SEGS solar complex in northern San Bernardino County, California.

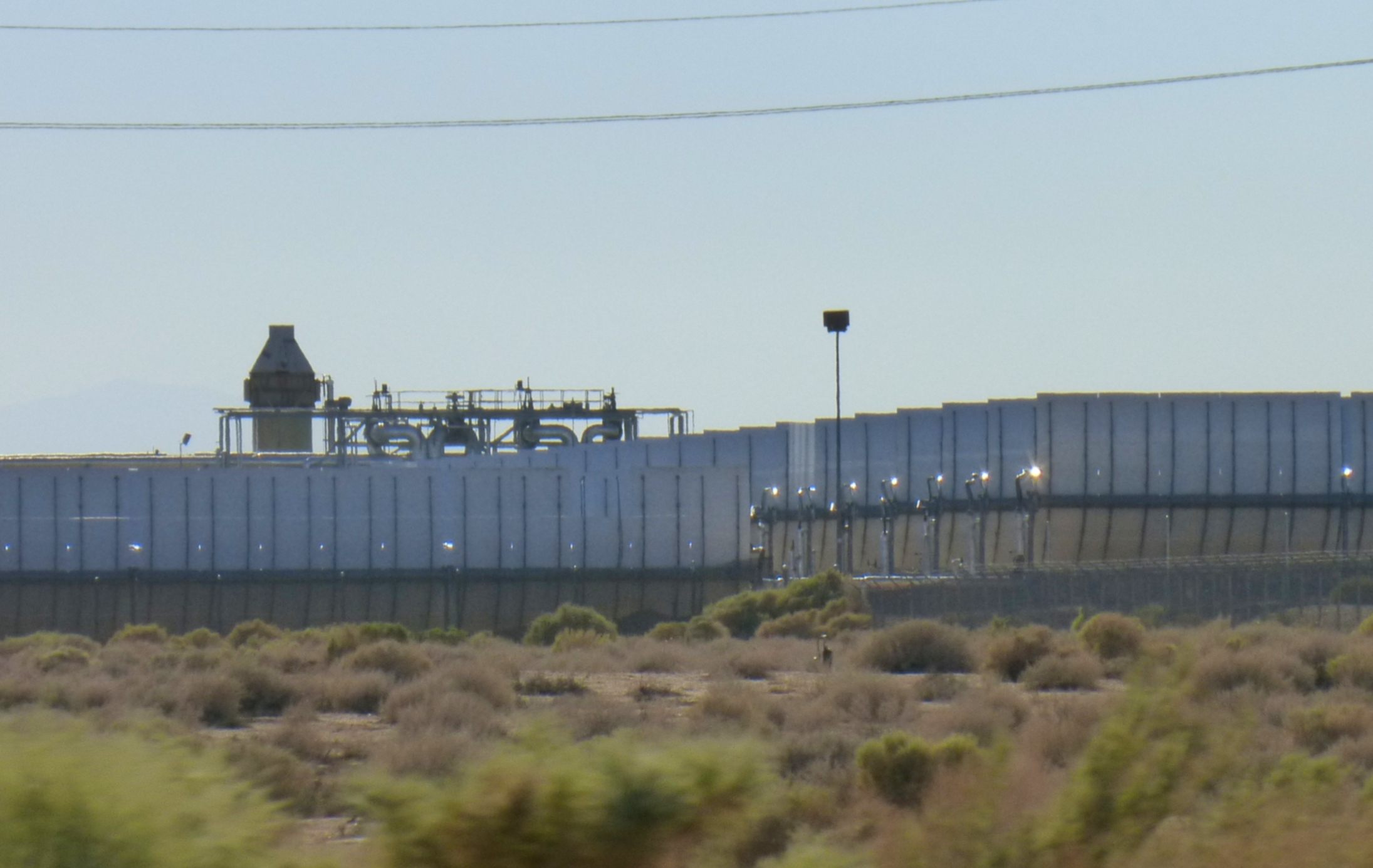
A close-up view of Kramer Junction SEGS plant

Trough systems predominate among today's commercial solar power plants. Nine separate trough power plants, called Solar Energy Generating Systems (SEGS), were built in the 1980s in the Mojave Desert near Barstow by the Israeli company BrightSource Energy (formerly Luz Industries). These plants have a combined capacity of 354 MW. NextEra says that the solar plants power 232,500 homes (during the day, at peak power) and displace 3,800 tons of pollution per year that would have been produced if the electricity had been provided by fossil fuels, such as oil.

Trough systems convert the heat from the sun into electricity. Because of their parabolic shape, trough collectors can focus the sun at 30-60 times its normal intensity on a receiver pipe located along the focal line of the trough. Synthetic oil circulates through the pipe and captures this heat, reaching temperatures of 390 °C (735 °F). The hot oil is pumped to a generating station and routed through a heat exchanger to produce steam. Finally, electricity is produced in a conventional steam turbine. The SEGS plants operate on natural gas on cloudy days or after dark, and natural gas provides 25% of the total output. Critics note that this reliance on gas-fired power for "backup" electricity has, over the 35-year history of the plants, generated over 3 million tons of CO_{2} emissions more than if the electricity had been generated by a nuclear plant.

=== Desert Sunlight Solar Farm ===
The Desert Sunlight Solar Farm is a 550 megawatt (MW_{AC}) photovoltaic power station approximately six miles north of Desert Center, California, in the Mojave Desert. It uses approximately 8.8 million cadmium telluride modules made by the US thin-film manufacturer First Solar. As of Fall 2015, the Solar Farm has the same 550 MW installed capacity as the Topaz Solar Farm in the Carrizo Plain region of Central California, making both of them tied for the second largest completed solar plants by installed capacity.

=== Nevada Solar One ===
Nevada Solar One has a 64-MW generating capacity and is located in Boulder City, Nevada. It was built by the U.S. Department of Energy, National Renewable Energy Laboratory, and Acciona Solar.

Nevada Solar One uses parabolic troughs as thermal solar concentrators, heating tubes of liquid which act as solar receivers. These solar receivers are specially coated tubes made of glass and steel, and about 19,300 of these four meter long tubes are used in the plant. Nevada Solar One also uses a technology that collects extra heat by putting it into phase-changing molten salts, which enable energy to be drawn at night. Using thermal energy storage systems, solar thermal operating periods can even be extended to meet baseload needs. Solar thermal power plants designed for solar-only generation are well matched to summer noon peak loads in prosperous areas with significant cooling demands, such as the south-western United States.

The cost of Nevada Solar One is in the range of $220–250 million. The power produced is slightly more expensive than wind power, but was less than photovoltaic (PV) power. As photovoltaics became less expensive, some proposed CSP projects have been converted to photovoltaics projects.

=== Copper Mountain Solar Facility ===
The Copper Mountain Solar Facility is a 552 megawatt (MW) solar photovoltaic power plant in Boulder City, Nevada. Sempra Generation began construction of the plant in January 2010 and the facility began generating electricity on December 1, 2010. At its construction peak more than 350 workers were installing the 775,000 First Solar panels on the 380-acre site. The power from Copper Mountain Solar Facility (and the adjacent 10 MW El Dorado Solar Power Plant) is being sold to Pacific Gas & Electric under separate 20-year contracts. Californian utilities were required to obtain 20 percent of their energy supply from renewable energy sources by the end of 2010, increasing to 33 percent by 2020.

=== Nellis Solar Power Plant ===
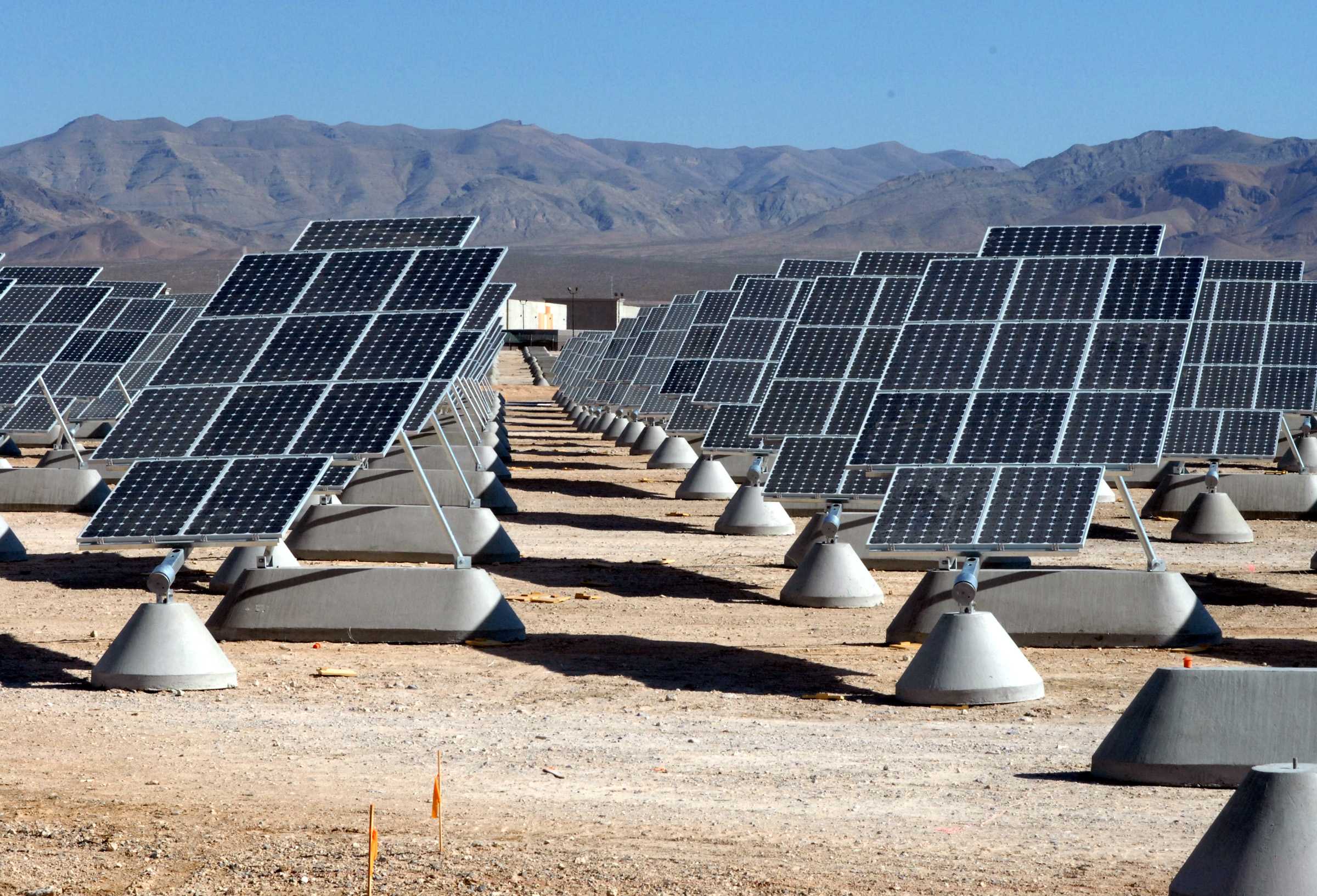
Nellis Solar Power Plant at Nellis Air Force Base in the USA. These panels track the sun in one axis.

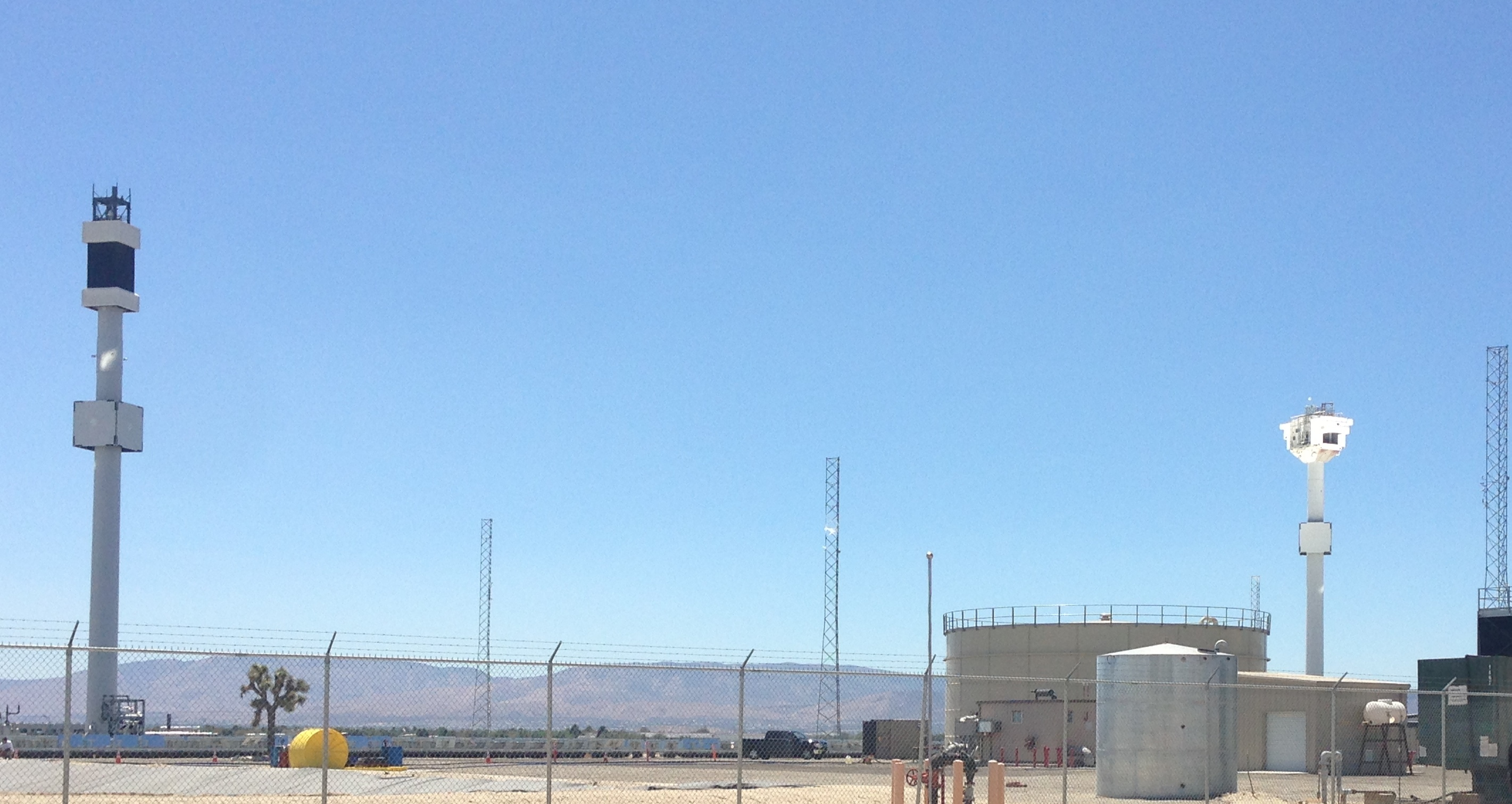
The Sierra SunTower power plant in Lancaster, California.

In December 2007, the U.S. Air Force announced the completion of the Nellis Solar Power Plant, a solar photovoltaic (PV) system, at Nellis Air Force Base in Clark County, Nevada. Occupying 140 acres (57 ha) of land leased from the Air Force at the western edge of the base, this ground-mounted photovoltaic system employs an advanced sun tracking system, designed and deployed by SunPower. Tilted toward the south, each set of solar panels rotates around a central bar to track the sun from east to west. The 14 MW system generates more than 30 million kilowatt-hours of electricity each year (about 82 thousand kilowatt-hours per day) and supply approximately 25 percent of the total power used at the base. The Nellis Solar Power Plant was one of the largest solar photovoltaic systems in North America.

=== Ivanpah Solar Power Facility ===
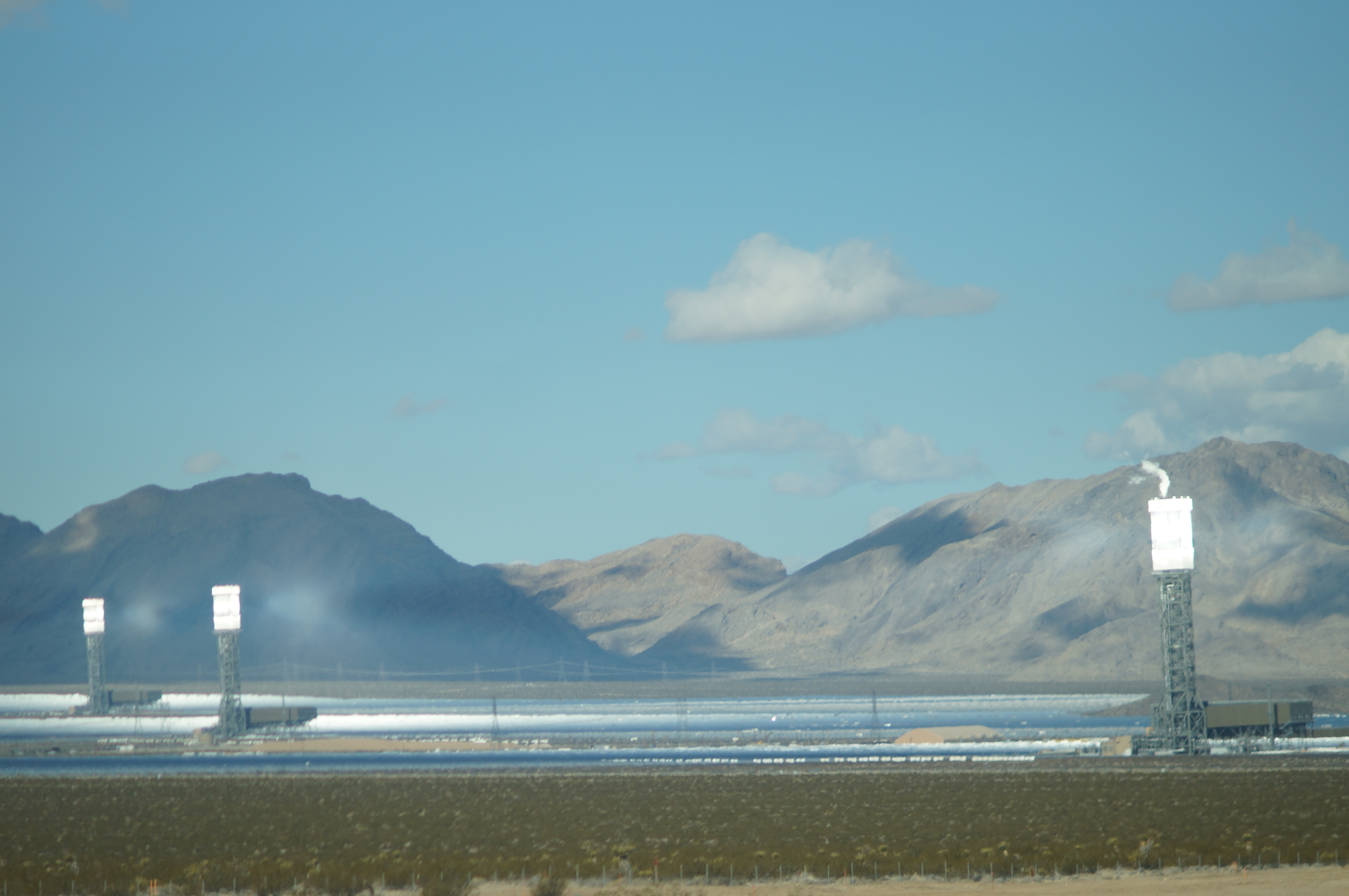
Ivanpah Solar Electric Generating System with all three towers under load, Feb 2014. Taken from I-15

The 392 MW Ivanpah Solar Power Facility, located 40 miles (64 km) southwest of Las Vegas, is the world's largest solar-thermal power plant project, which became fully operational on February 13, 2014. BrightSource Energy received a $1.6 billion loan guarantee from the United States Department of Energy to build the project, which deploys 347,000 heliostat mirrors focusing solar energy on boilers located on centralized solar power towers. In February 2012, Ivanpah was awarded the CSP (Concentrating Solar Power) Project of the Year by Solar Power Generation USA.

=== Mojave Solar Project ===
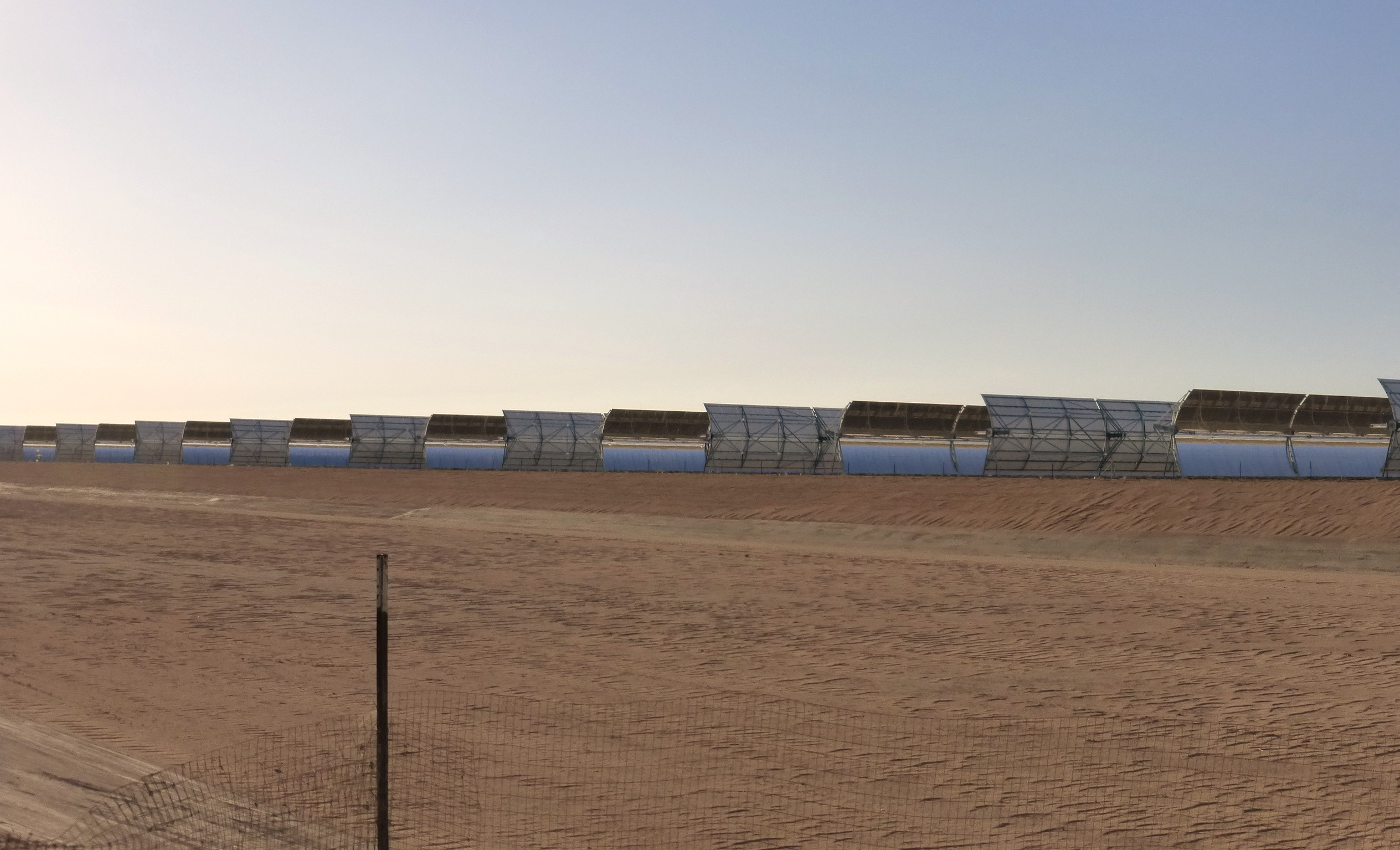
The Mojave Solar Project near Harper Lake in California

The Mojave Solar Project is a solar thermal power facility in the Mojave Desert in California, about 20 miles (32 km) northwest of Barstow. Surrounding the hamlet of Lockhart, Mojave Solar is adjacent to Harper Lake and the SEGS VIII–IX solar plant. The 250 MW concentrating solar power (CSP) plant was estimated to cost $1.6 billion in total and was commissioned in December 2014. The developer, Abengoa, secured a $1.2 billion loan guarantee from the US Department of Energy for the project.

The nominal 250 MW solar electric generating facility generates steam in solar steam generators, which will expand through a steam turbine generator to produce electrical power from twin, independently operable solar fields, each feeding a 125 MW power island. The plant should generate 617,000 MWh of power annually, enough power for more than 88,000 households and will prevent the emission of over 430 kilotons of CO_{2} a year. Pacific Gas & Electric has agreed to a 25-year power purchase agreement.

=== Antelope Valley Solar Ranch ===
The 230 MW Antelope Valley Solar Ranch is a First Solar photovoltaic project now owned by Exelon in the Antelope Valley area of the Western Mojave Desert. In September 2011, the project received a $646 million loan guarantee from the US Department of Energy, and its construction was estimated to generate 350 construction jobs and 20 permanent jobs. It features an innovative utility-scale deployment of inverters with voltage regulation and monitoring technologies, which will "enable the project to provide more stable and continuous power". Electricity from the Antelope Valley Solar Ranch project will be sold to Pacific Gas & Electric Company under a 25-year contract.

== Environmental impacts ==
=== Land use issues ===
A 2013 study by the National Renewable Energy Laboratory concluded that the average large photovoltaic plant in the United States occupied 3.1 acres (1.3 ha) of permanently disturbed area and 3.4 acres (1.4 ha) of total site area per gigawatt-hour per year. The average concentrated solar power plant in the US occupied 2.7 acres (1.1 ha) of disturbed area and 3.5 acres (1.4 ha) of total area per GWh/yr, A 2015 life-cycle analysis of land use for various sources of electricity concluded that concentrating solar power had a land-use footprint of 9.0 m^{2}/MWhr for trough, and 14 m^{2}/MWhr for power tower. The concentrating solar footprint was smaller than that of coal power (18 m^{2}/MWhr), but larger than the other sources studied, including ground photovoltaic (7.9 m^{2}/MWhr), natural gas (0.49 m^{2}/MWhr), and wind power (0.26 m^{2}/MWhr).

The federal government has dedicated nearly 2,000 times more acreage to oil and gas leases than to solar development. In 2010 the Bureau of Land Management approved nine large-scale solar projects, with a total generating capacity of 3,682 megawatts, representing approximately 40,000 acres (16,000 ha). In contrast, in 2010, the Bureau of Land Management processed more than 5,200 applications gas and oil leases, and issued 1,308 leases, for a total of 3.2 million acres. Currently, 38.2 million acres of onshore public lands and an additional 36.9 million acres of offshore exploration in the Gulf of Mexico are under lease for oil and gas development, exploration and production.

Some of the land in the eastern Mojave Desert will be preserved, but the solar industry is mainly interested in areas of the western desert, "where the sun burns hotter and there is easier access to transmission lines", said Kenn J. Arnecke of FPL Energy, a view shared by many industry executives.

=== Water use issues ===
Concentrating solar plants in the Mojave Desert have brought up issues of water use, because concentrating solar power plants with wet-cooling systems have high water-consumption intensities compared to other types of electric power plants; only fossil-fuel plants with carbon capture and storage may have higher water intensities. A 2013 study comparing various sources of electricity found that the median water consumption during operations of concentrating solar power plants with wet cooling was 810 gal/MWhr for power tower plants and 890 gal/MWhr for trough plants. This was higher than the operational water consumption (with cooling towers) for nuclear (720 gal/MWhr), coal (530 gal/MWhr), or natural gas (210 gal/MWhr). A 2011 study by the National Renewable Energy Laboratory came to similar conclusions: for power plants with cooling towers, water consumption during operations was 865 gal/MWhr for CSP trough, 786 gal/MWhr for CSP tower, 687 gal/MWhr for coal, 672 gal/MWhr for nuclear, and 198 gal/MWhr for natural gas. The Solar Energy Industries Association noted that the Nevada Solar One trough CSP plant consumes 850 gal/MWhr.

In 2007, the US Congress directed the Department of Energy to report on ways to reduce water consumption by CSP. The subsequent report noted that dry cooling technology was available that, although more expensive to build and operate, could reduce water consumption by CSP by 91 to 95 percent, bringing their consumption below that of conventional power plants. A hybrid wet/dry cooling system could reduce water consumption by 32 to 58 percent. A 2015 report by NREL noted that of the 24 operating CSP power plants in the US, 17 used wet-cooling systems. The four existing CSP plants with dry-cooled systems were the three power plants at the Ivanpah Solar Power Facility near Barstow, California, and the Genesis Solar Energy Project in Riverside County, California. Of 15 CSP projects under construction or development in the US as of March 2015, 6 planned to use wet systems (including one wet system using reclaimed wastewater), 7 planned for dry systems, 1 hybrid, and 1 unspecified.

=== Wildlife ===
Some solar power plants with power tower designs in the Mojave Desert have come under scrutiny for bird mortality. In general, these facilities are fenced off to help keep terrestrial wildlife out. However, in the case of concentrated solar power plants such as the Ivanpah Solar Power Facility, studies have concluded that a significant number of birds and bats are injured or killed either by colliding into the heliostat mirrors or from burning in solar flux created by the mirror field. Also, roadrunners become trapped outside the installed perimeter fences, where they become easy prey for coyotes, who have killed and eaten dozens of them since the facilities have been constructed.

=== Mitigation ===
Ecologically sensitive habitat in the vicinity of Boron and Mojave may experience negative impacts from photovoltaic solar and battery installations by Avantus. The Onyx Conservation Project will set aside 215,000 acres (87,000 ha) of contiguous space for space and forage free of disruption for the desert tortoise, Mohave ground squirrel and California condor. The project will also protect more than 80,000 acres (32,000 ha) of western Joshua Tree habitat. Avantus bought federal grazing rights located west of Highway 14 between Red Rock Canyon and Highway 178. Avantus then applied for permission to permanently retire the grazing rights on the property.

== See also ==
- List of solar thermal power stations
- Renewable energy commercialization
- Solar power in California
- List of photovoltaic power stations
- Renewable energy in the United States
- Renewable portfolio standard
