= RV Apex Solar =

Coordinates: 36.393°N 114.965°W

Apex Solar is a 154-acre (62 ha) 20 MWac (24.9 MWdc) photovoltaic solar power facility located entirely on private land within the Apex Industrial Park in the City of North Las Vegas, Nevada. The plant is connected to the local grid via an existing 69kV transmission line owned by NV Energy.

Power will be generated by 88,000 Trina Solar poly-crystalline modules and sold via 25-year power purchase agreement with Nevada Power Company (a unit of NV Energy). SunEdison is responsible for operation and maintenance.

== History ==
The plant was acquired by the Southern Company in June 2012.
