= Truckee Meadows Water Authority =

Truckee Meadows Water Authority (TMWA) is a public authority providing water services in the Truckee Meadows of Washoe County in Northern Nevada, which serves more than 330,000 residents. The Authority is governed by a seven-member Board of Directors, appointed by the cities of Reno and Sparks and Washoe County.

The staff is led by a General Manager. The Authority provides a wide range of water services to households and businesses within its service area, ranging from potable water residential service, to irrigation, non-potable water and fire protection services.

The Authority is a party to the Truckee River Operating Agreement, an interstate agreement governing the use of water resources from the Truckee River.

== Member agencies ==
- TMWA Chairwoman and Washoe County Commissioner Clara Andriola (Republican)
- TMWA Vice Chairman Paul Anderson (Republican)
- TMWA Director and Reno City Council Member Naomi Duerr (Democratic)
- TMWA Director and Washoe County Commissioner Alexis Hill (Democratic)
- TMWA Director and Reno City Council Member Miguel Martinez (Independent)
- TMWA Director and Reno City Council Member Kathleen Taylor (Republican)
- TMWA Director and Sparks City Council Member Dian VanderWell (Independent)

== See also ==
- Donner Lake
