= Silverhawk Generating Station =

Coordinates: 36.410694°N 114.960750°W

Silverhawk Generating Station is a 585 MW gas-fired power station located in the Apex Industrial Park in North Las Vegas, Nevada. Power is generated by a D-11 steam turbine powered by two 501FD2 combustion turbines. The Southern Nevada Water Authority is a 25% owner in the plant.

== History ==
The facility began construction as a Pinnacle West power station.

== Facility ==
Since it is located in a desert where water is limited, the plant uses a six-story-high dry cooling system.
