= Nellis Solar Power Plant =

Solar park in Nevada, US

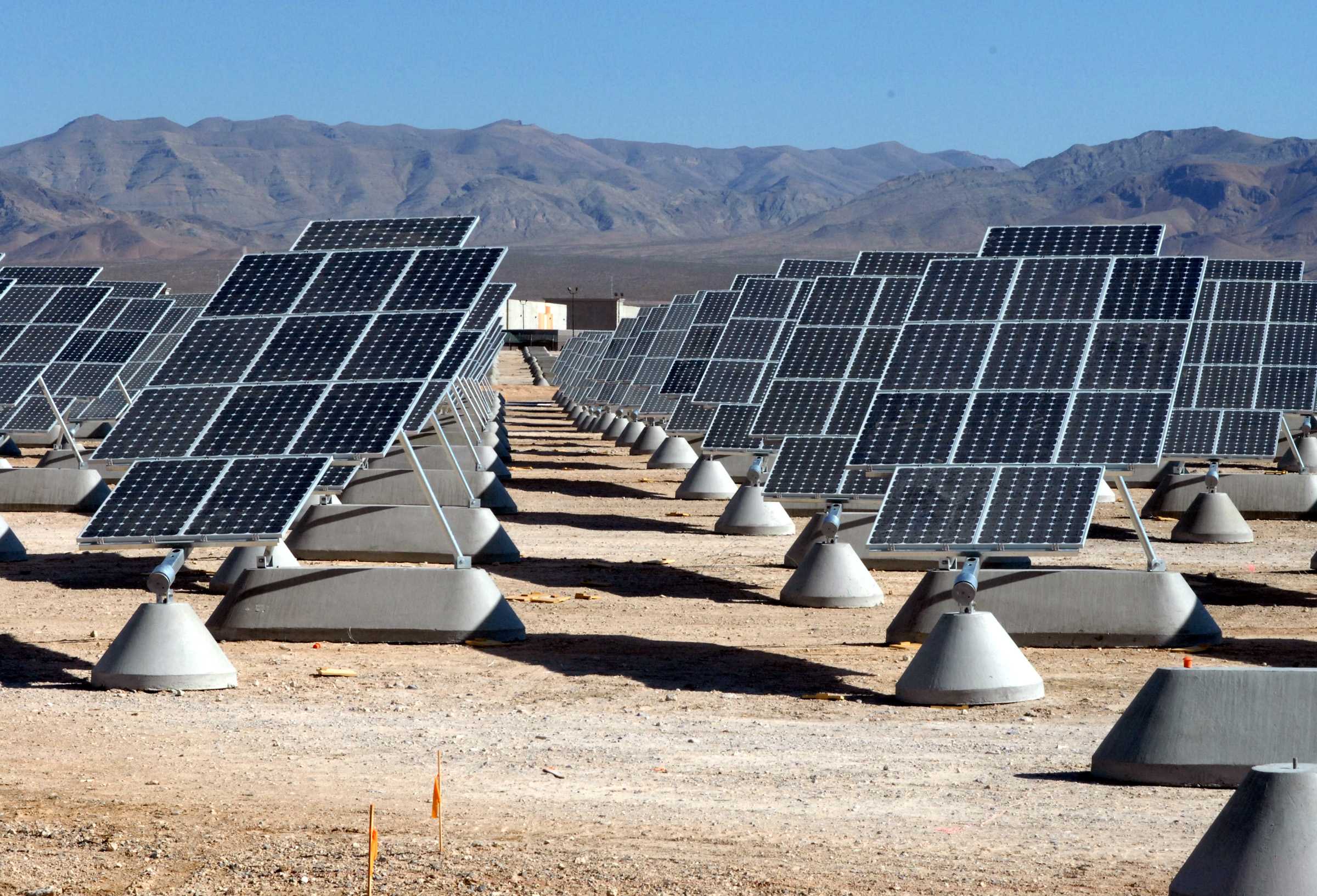
- Nellis Solar Power Plant, was the second largest photovoltaic power plant in North America when built
- Country: United States
- Location: Nellis Air Force Base, Nevada
- Coordinates: 36°15′30″N 115°03′10″W
- Commission date: December 17, 2007
- Owner: MEMC

Solar farm
- Type: Flat-panel PV
- Site area: 140 acres (0.6 km^{2})

Power generation
- Units operational: 72,416
- Nameplate capacity: 14.2 MW
- Annual net output: 32 GWh

External links
- Commons: Related media on Commons

The Nellis Solar Power Plant is a 14-megawatt (MW) photovoltaic power station located within Nellis Air Force Base. The power plant was inaugurated in a ceremony on December 17, 2007, with Nevada Governor Jim Gibbons activating its full operation.

The peak power generation capacity of the plant is 15 MW_{AC}. This means the ratio of average to peak output, or capacity factor, of this plant is around 22%.

Construction began on April 23, 2007, and operation of the first 5 MW began on October 12, 2007.

== Economics ==
Under the terms of the Power Purchase Agreement, MMA Renewable Ventures, who own the panels, is leasing the land at no cost and Nellis is agreeing to buy the power for 20 years at about 2.2 cents/kW·h, instead of the 9 cents they are paying to Nevada Power, saving the Air Force $1 million each year. None of the $100 million cost came from the Air Force, but instead MMA "funds, owns and operates the solar energy system and sells the electricity generated to the energy customer through a predictable, long term contract."

The partners were able to build the plant, recover costs and produce electricity at a savings, because of the fairly complex financing structure arranged among MMA, its investors, Nevada Power, and Nellis — in addition to the value of solar tax incentives.

The plant was expected to produce 30 GWh per year but actually produced about 32 GWh the first year, 8% more than expected, saving the Air Force $1.2 million in the first year of operation.

Gaining the most resilience benefit from a solar installation requires adding a Battery energy storage system to retain power when the solar array is not producing and ideally a Microgrid to allow independent operation from the electric grid during a power outage. For this reason, Nellis announced a battery storage and microgrid project in 2022 to complement its solar array.

== Design ==
Nellis consists of 5,821 tilted axes, T20 single axis trackers made by Sunpower, and uses 72,416 solar panels, each 200 watts, and 54 Xantrex (Schneider Electric) GT 250 inverters, each rated 250 kW. The maximum output is therefore inverter limited to 13.5 megawatts (AC). At full output, the inverters are 96% efficient. Approximately 10% of the panels are mounted on north–south-oriented horizontal single-axis trackers. About one-third of the solar panels were made by Suntech Power, the lead supplier.

== Renewable portfolio standard ==
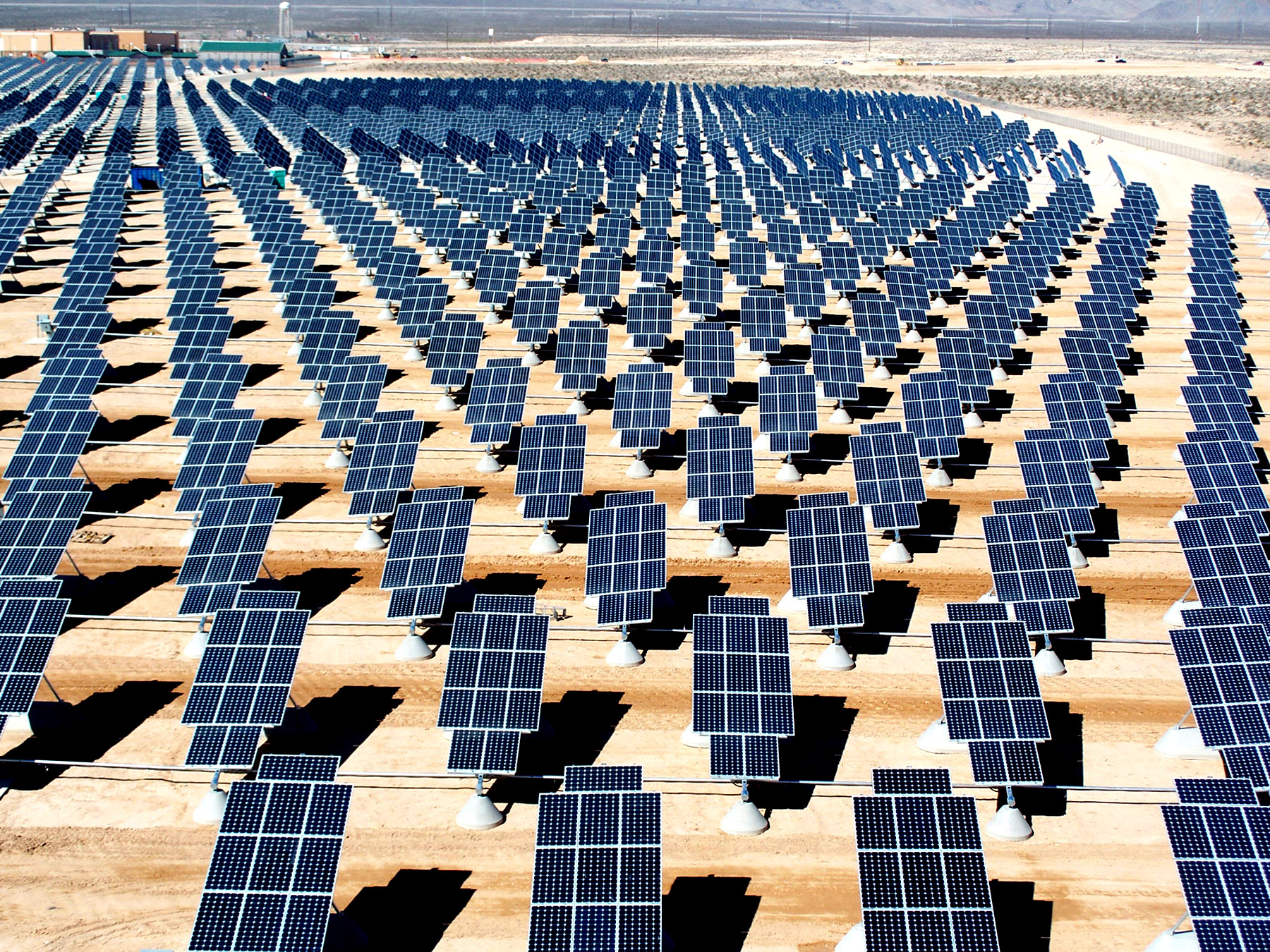
A section of the Nellis Solar Power Plant

In 1999, Nevada passed a renewable portfolio standard (RPS) as part of their 1997 Electric Restructuring Legislation (AB 366). It required any electric providers in the state to acquire actual renewable electric generation or purchase renewable energy credits so that each utility had 1 percent of total consumption in renewables. However, on June 8, 2001, Nevada Governor Kenny Guinn signed SB 372, at the time the country's most aggressive renewable portfolio standard. The law requires that 15 percent of all electricity generated in Nevada be derived from new renewables by the year 2013.

The 2001, revision to the RPS keeps in place Nevada's commitment to expand solar energy resources by requiring that at least 5 percent of the renewable energy projects must generate electricity from solar energy.

In June 2005, the Nevada legislature passed a bill during a special legislative session that modified the Nevada RPS (Assembly Bill 03). The bill extends the deadline and raised the requirements of the RPS to 20 percent of sales by 2015.

== Expansion ==
A separate plant called Nellis Solar PV II, located to the south of the base, generates another 15 megawatts of power. It began construction on March 24, 2015, and was completed in February 2016.

== Presidential visit ==
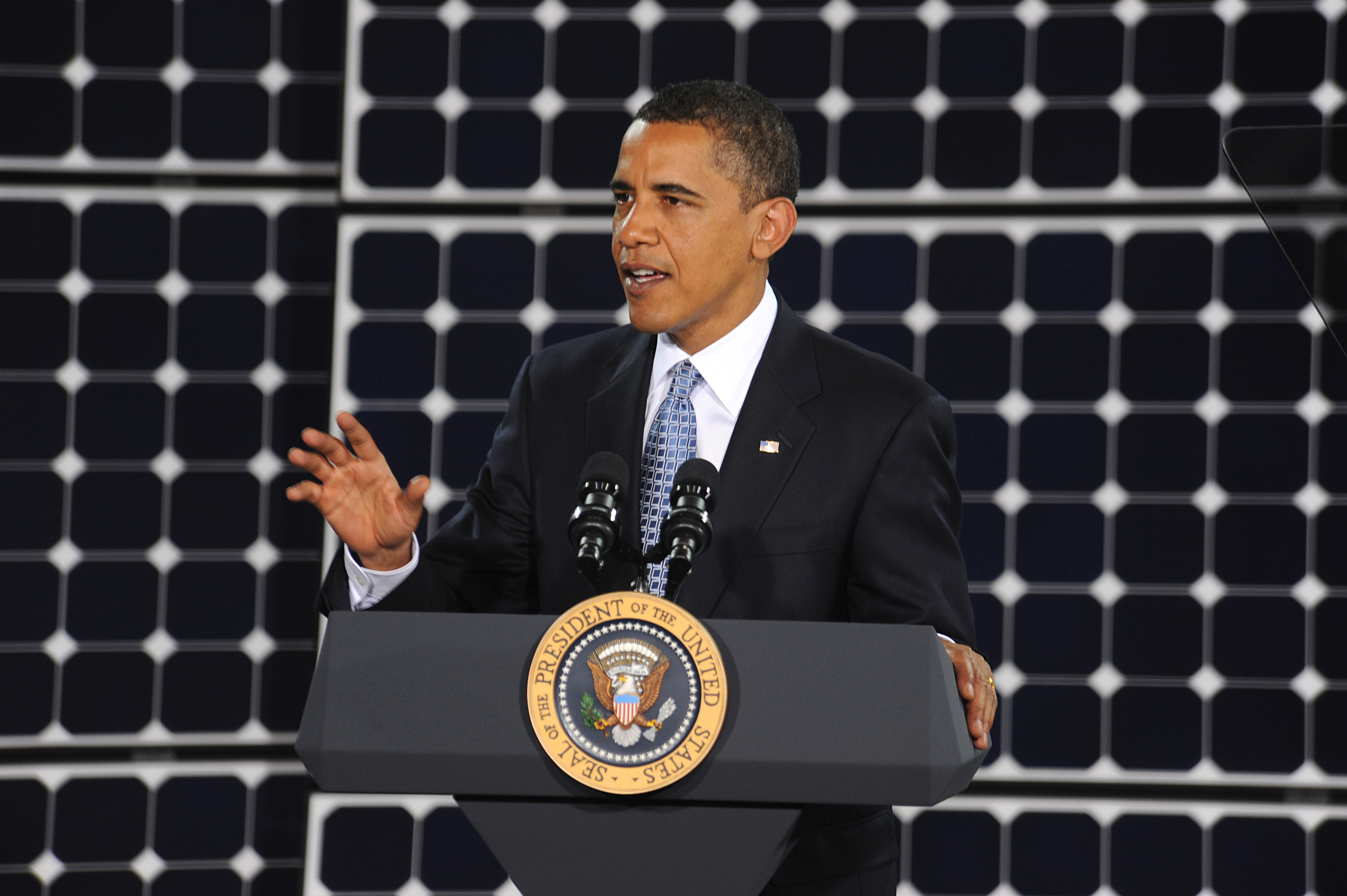
President Barack Obama at the Nellis Solar Power Plant in 2009

President Barack Obama visited the facility and addressed an audience of more than 450 people on May 27, 2009.

== Production ==
Generation (MW·h) of Nellis Air Force Base Solar Array
Year	Jan	Feb	Mar	Apr	May	Jun	Jul	Aug	Sep	Oct	Nov	Dec	Total
2007										1,497	859	398	2,755
2008	535	1,284	3,143	3,923	3,995	5,120	3,630	3,386	3,338	2,382	1,136	627	32,500
2009	614	1,073	3,155	3,651	4,230	3,106	3,672	4,258	3,525	2,323	1,571	821	32,000
2010	443	819	2,023	2,585	3,662	4,322	3,339	4,211	3,925	2,377	2,264	1,330	31,301
2011	1,447	1,940	2,432	3,392	3,745	4,286	3,135	3,681	2,632	2,535	1,553	1,347	32,125
2012	842	1,099	1,587	2,450	3,593	3,710	3,288	3,228	3,672	3,566	2,889	2,236	32,159
2013	1,796	2,200	2,706	3,141	3,381	3,441	2,664	2,658	2,616	3,040	2,069	2,046	31,758
2014	1,527	1,597	2,302	2,426	2,870	3,291	2,882	3,134	3,244	3,287	2,793	1,849	31,202
2015	1,521	2,134	2,767	3,130	2,867	3,159	2,925	2,876	2,652	2,341	2,228	1,829	30,428
2016	648	3,789	1,218	1,284	1,644	1,655	1,863	1,818	1,774	1,472	1,416	1,139	19,725
2017	1,413	1,453	2,537	2,790	3,123	3,206	2,697	2,768	2,484	2,442	1,678	1,615	28,213
2018	1,276	1,637	2,097	2,618	2,768	3,242	2,762	2,792	2,686	2,106	1,646	1,274	26,910
2019	1,395	1,527	2,112	2,499	2,649	2,917	2,946	2,869	2,452	2,380	1,624	1,097	27,897
2020	1,423	1,797	1,919	2,263	2,535	2,719	2,825	2,536	2,212	2,004	1,489	1,230	24,959
2021	1,009	1,289	1,631	1,970	2,176	1,993	1,916	2,008	1,774	1,398	1,140	869	19,180
2022	1,164	1,408	1,713	2,005	2,289	2,175	1,987	1,825	1,773	1,595	1,169	866	19,975
2023	796	1,454	985	2,634	2,094	2,436	1,597	2,267	2,197	2,062	1,864	1,337	21,723
2024	1,380	1,457	2,028	2,533	2,635	2,330	2,176	2,280	2,074	1,860	1,599	1,412	23,764
Total													468,574

== See also ==
- DeSoto Next Generation Solar Energy Center
- List of photovoltaic power stations
- Renewable energy in the United States
- Renewable portfolio standard
- Solar power
- Solar power in the United States
- Solar power in Nevada
