= Fort Churchill Generating Station =

Gas-fired power plant in Nevada, USA

Coordinates: 39°07′41″N 119°07′56″W

Fort Churchill Generating Station is a 226-megawatt plant located at Wabuska, Nevada owned by NV Energy. The plant consists of 2 units and first went into service in 1968. The plant burns natural gas to power two boilers. It is located in Lyon County, north of Yerington.

The plant cooling water is used to help sustain the Nevada Department of Wildlife’s Mason Valley Wildlife Management Area wetlands.

== Units ==
- 1 113-MW gas-fired (1968), Babcock & Wilcox boiler with General Electric generator
- 1 113-MW gas-fired (1971), Babcock & Wilcox boiler with General Electric generator

== Safety record ==
In 2010, the plant was recognized by the Edison Electric Institute for operating over 23 years without a lost time accident. The plant employs 26 people. As of 2021, the plant has operated for 28 years without incurring a lost time accident.
