= Solar power in Nevada =

Overview of solar power in the U.S. state of Nevada

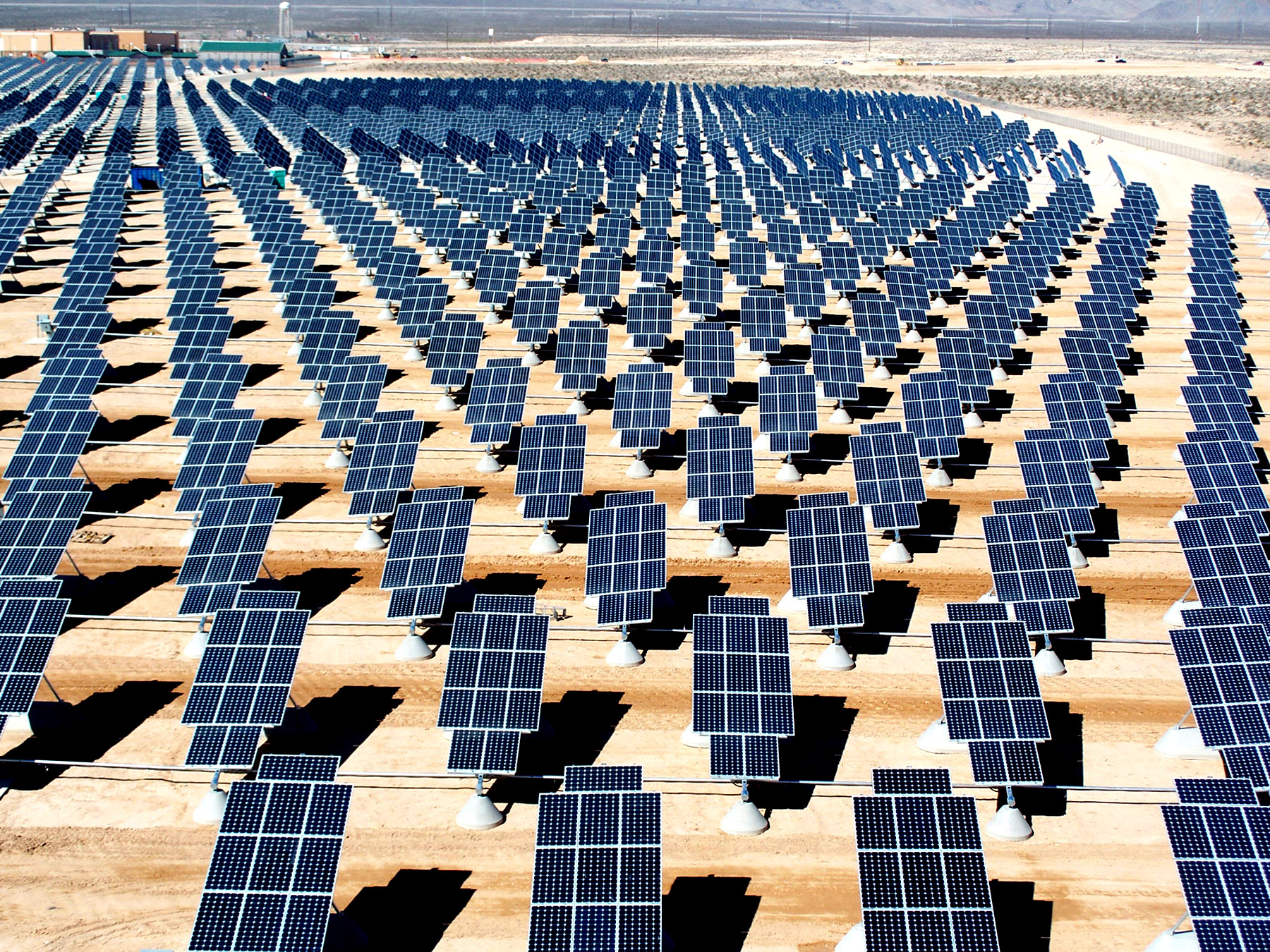
Nellis Solar Power Plant

Solar power in Nevada is growing due to a renewable portfolio standard which requires 50% renewable energy by 2030. The state has abundant open land areas and some of the best solar potential in the country.

== Solar power plants ==
2017 electricity generation in Nevada by source

The number and size of photovoltaic power stations in Nevada has been growing rapidly since 2010. As of 2018, the largest is the 552 MW Copper Mountain Solar Facility near Boulder City, which is a group of co-located units, each sized up to 250 MW. Another 250 MW unit has been approved for construction, which could make it the largest solar facility in the United States. Earlier notable solar facilities in the state include the 14.2 megawatt (MW-peak), 140 acre Nellis Solar Power Plant; and the 64 MW, 400 acre concentrating solar thermal power plant Nevada Solar One, which both began operation in 2007.

Nevada has also been a leader in low-cost solar electricity generation, establishing several milestones. The Nellis plant was able to provide Nellis Air Force Base with electricity for only 2.2 cents/kWh—compared to the 9 cents they were paying Nevada Power—by selling renewable energy credits (RECs). In 2015, the 100 MW Playa Solar 2 project—to be constructed by First Solar with a 20-year power purchase agreement with NV Energy - was proposed for $0.0378 per kilowatt-hour. This was below the lowest price of $0.046 available the previous year from the 100 MW Boulder Solar plant. In 2018, the 300 megawatt (MWAC) Eagle Shadow Mountain Solar Farm was approved for construction with flat rate of $0.02376 per kilowatt-hour throughout its 25-year PPA term, which could establish a new record.

Solar photovoltaic and/or thermal power has also been proposed to augment some geothermal power plants in the region—which struggle to meet demand during mid-day peak hours due to their higher bottom of the thermodynamic cycle—since the solar plants will peak at that time.

As of February 2022, there are 26 large proposed projects in Nevada, totaling over 21 GW of capacity, or five times the state's existing solar capacity. These projects also include more than 17 GW of energy storage. Half of these were proposed in Nye County, which would be enabled by two new transmission lines, though some are close to Death Valley National Park.

== Solar-related businesses in Nevada ==
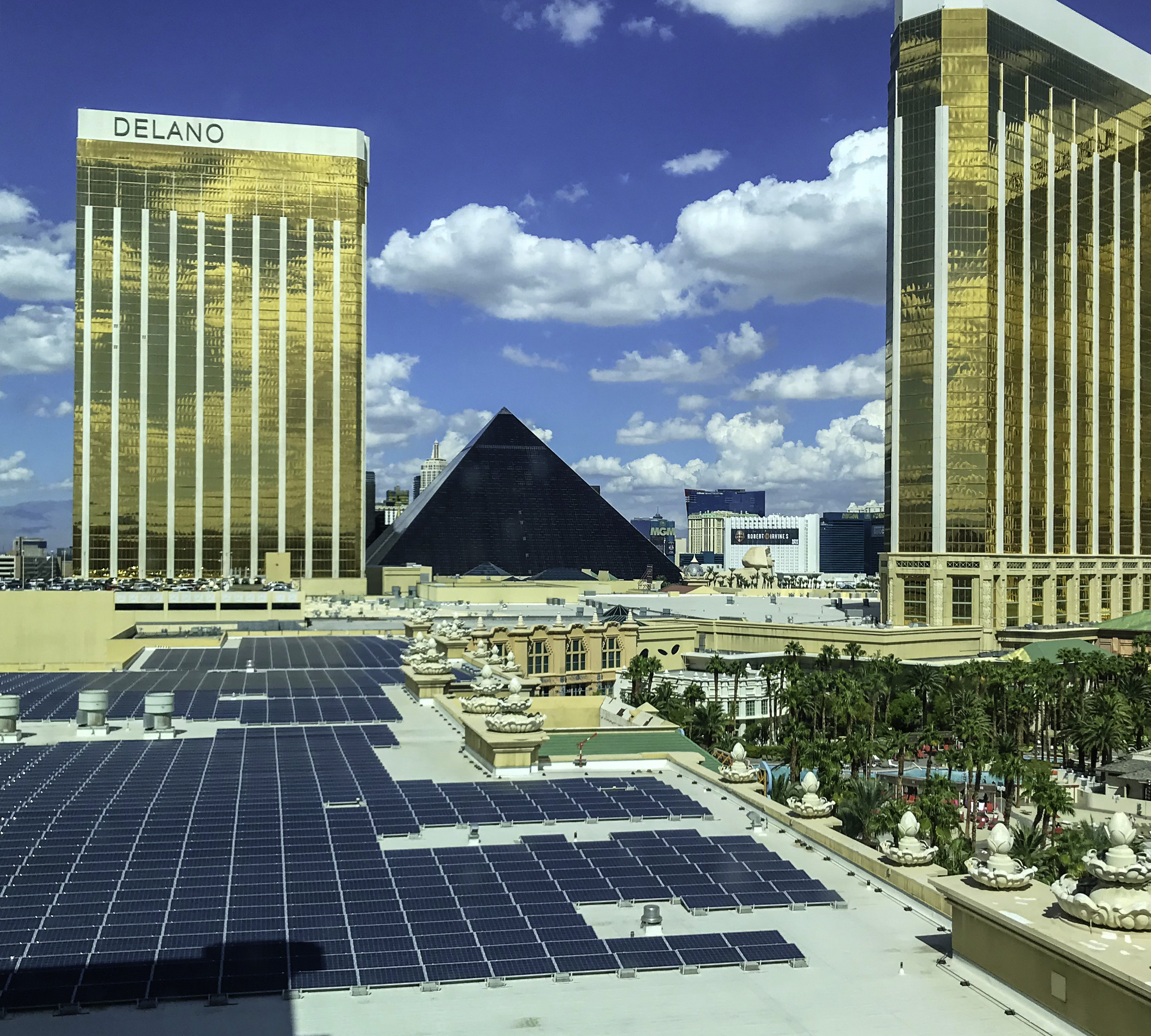
Rooftop solar, Las Vegas

Prominent Nevada-based solar installation companies include 702 Energy Savers, Radiant Solar, Summerlin Energy, Bombard Renewable Energy, and Hamilton Solar.

Nevada had 129 MW in private installations of rooftop solar in 2015.

== Incentives ==
The federal Residential Energy Efficient Property Credit (income tax credit on IRS Form 5695) for residential PV and solar thermal was extended in December 2015 to remain at 30% of system cost (parts and installation). There is no maximum cap on the credit, the credit can be applied toward the alternative minimum tax, and any excess credit (greater than that year's tax liability) can be rolled into the following year.

== Net metering controversy ==
Net energy metering rules were changed in December 2015, unfavorably for homeowners having or considering rooftop solar, and were applied even to existing installations. Some major installers, including SolarCity, Vivint, and SunRun, withdrew from the Nevada market.

After a public outcry, the earlier favorable rules were grandfathered for up to 32,000 customers whose systems were active or had a pending application by December 31, 2015. The Public Utilities Commission of Nevada approved bill AB405 in 2017 to restore net metering.

== Statistics ==
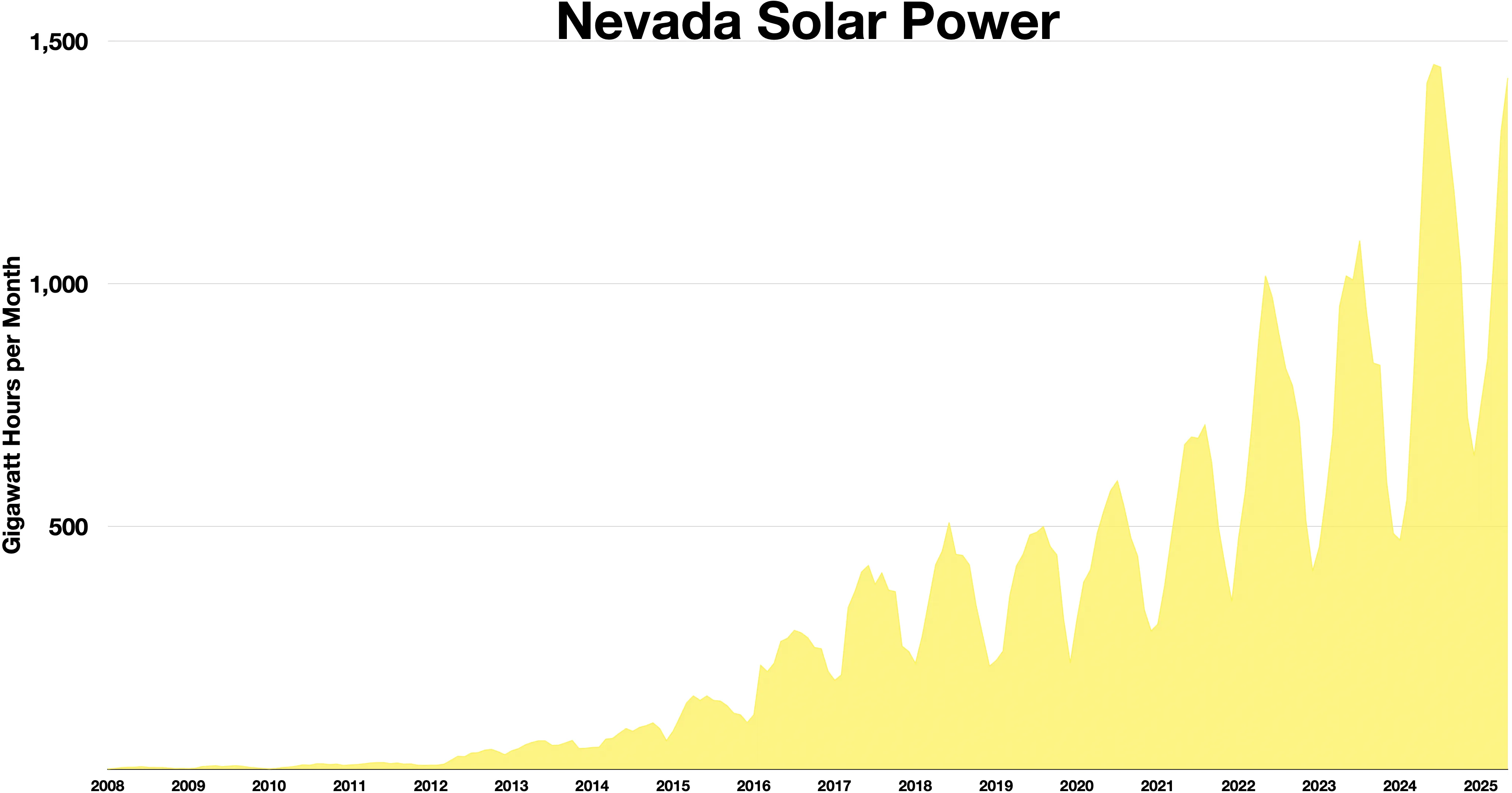
Nevada solar power

Nevada solar capacity (MW)
Year	Photovoltaics			CSP		
Year	Capacity	Installed	% change	Capacity	Installed	% change
2007	18.8	15.9	548%	64		
2008	34.2	14.9	82%	64		
2009	36.4	2.5	6%	64		
2010	104.7	68.3	188%	64		
2011	124.1	19.4	19%	64		
2012	349.7	225.6	182%	64		
2013	424.0	74.3	21%	64		
2014	823	399	94%	64		
2015	1,240	417	51%	184	120	
2016	2,241.9	1,001.9	81%	184	0	
2017	2,421.3	179.4	8%	184	0	
2018	2,951.3	530	21%	184	0	
2019	3,556.2	604.9	20%	184	0	
2020	3,871.7	315.5	8%	184	0	
2021	4,510.8	639.1	%			
2022	5,366	855.2	%			

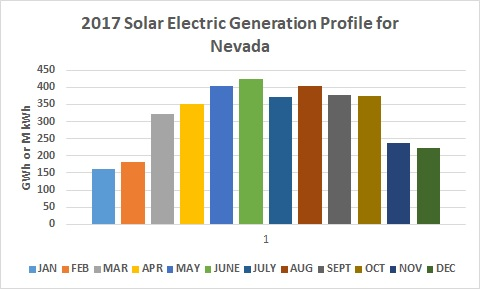
2017 Nevada solar energy generation profile

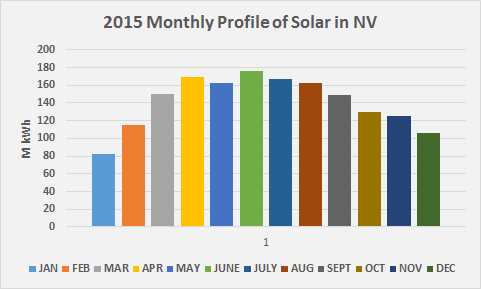
2015 monthly profile of solar energy for Nevada

Utility scale solar generation
Year	Generation (GWh)	Generation (% of NV total)	Generation (% of US solar)
2010	217	0.6%	17.9%
2011	290	0.9%	16%
2012	473	1.3%	10.9%
2013	749	2.1%	8.2%
2014	1,028	2.8%	5.6%
2015	1,658	4.2%	6.6%
2016	3,124	7.85%	8.67%
2017	3,966	10.38%	7.44%
2018*	4,344	10.88%	6.52%

* Preliminary data from Electric Power Monthly.

Beginning with the 2014 data year, the Energy Information Administration has estimated distributed solar photovoltaic generation and distributed solar photovoltaic capacity. These non-utility scale estimates project that, Nevada, generated the following additional solar energy.

Estimated distributed solar electric generation in Nevada
Year	Summer capacity (MW)	Electric energy (GWh or M kWh)
2014	49	86
2015	120.4	186
2016	209.5	372
2017	227.3	412
2018*	299.1	493

== See also ==
- Wind power in Nevada
- Eagle Shadow Mountain Solar Farm
- Solar power in the United States
- Renewable energy in the United States
