= Nevada Solar One =

Concentrated solar power station

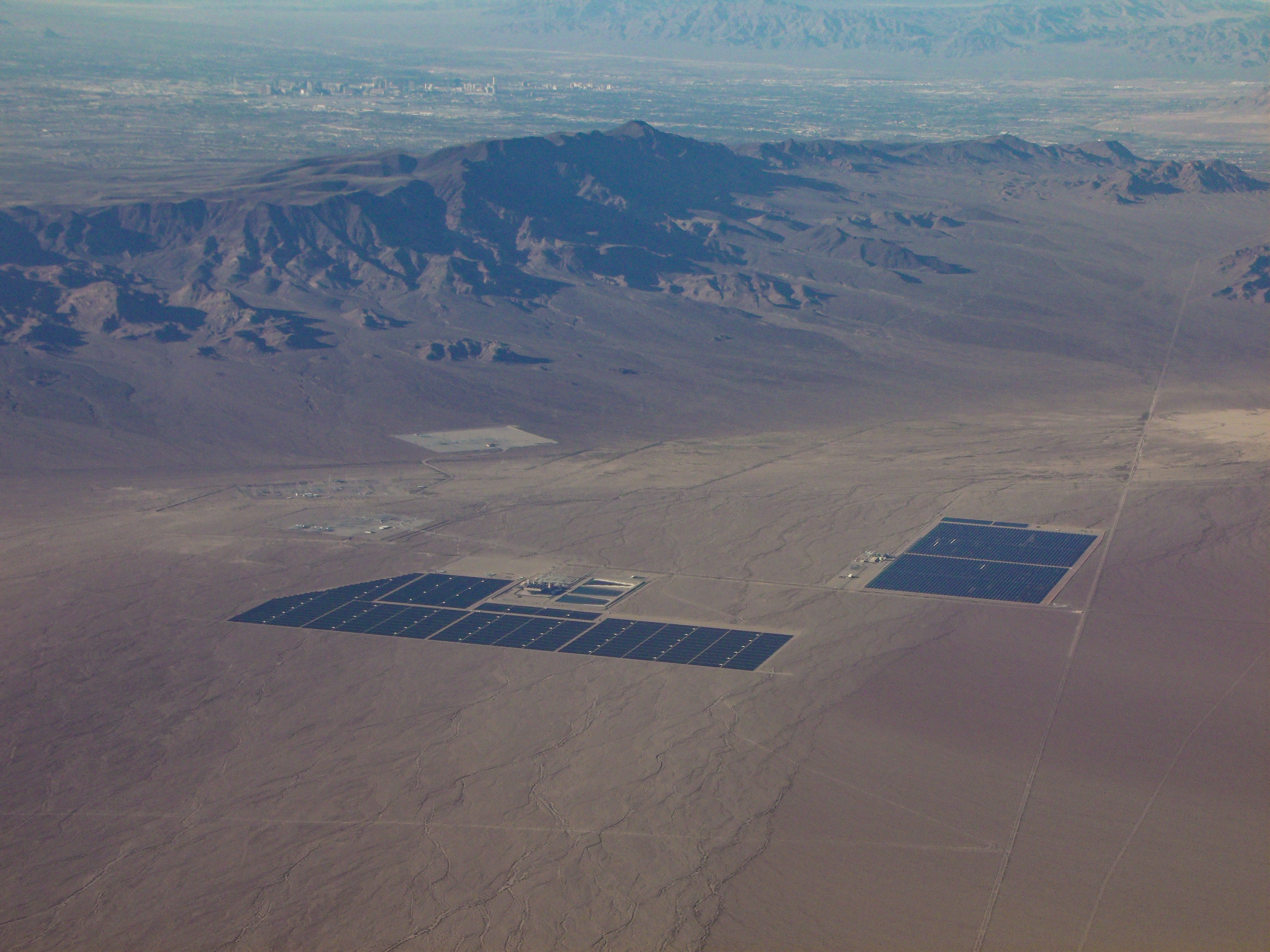
- Photograph of Nevada Solar One, with the Las Vegas Valley beyond the mountains behind it
- Country: United States
- Location: Eldorado Valley, Boulder City, Nevada
- Coordinates: 35°48′N 114°58.6′W
- Status: Operational
- Construction began: February 2006
- Commission date: June 2007
- Construction cost: $266 million
- Owner: Acciona Energy

Solar farm
- Type: CSP
- CSP technology: Parabolic trough
- Site resource: 2,606 kWh/m^{2}/yr
- Site area: 400 acres (162 ha)

Power generation
- Units operational: 1 x 75 MWe (gross)
- Make and model: Siemens SST-700
- Nameplate capacity: 72 MW
- Capacity factor: 18.4% (2014-2018)
- Annual net output: 115.9 GW·h

External links
- Website: nevada solar one
- Commons: Related media on Commons

Nevada Solar One is a concentrated solar power plant, with a nominal capacity of 64 MW and maximum steam turbine power output up to 72 MW net (75 MW gross), spread over an area of 400 acres (160 ha). The projected CO_{2} emissions avoided are equivalent to taking approximately 20,000 cars off the road. The project required an investment of $266 million USD, and the project officially went into operation in June 2007. Electricity production is estimated to be 134 GWh (gigawatt hours) per year.

In 2007, when the plant came on line, it was the second solar thermal energy (STE) power plant built in the United States in more than 16 years, and in 2007, the largest STE plant built in the world since 1991. It is located in Eldorado Valley in the southwest fringe of Boulder City, Nevada, and was built in that city's Energy Resource Zone, which requires renewable generation as part of plant development permits; Nevada Solar One was approved as part of Duke Energy's larger El Dorado Energy project, which built 1 GW of electrical generation capacity. The solar trough generation was built by Acciona Solar Power, a partially owned subsidiary of Spanish conglomerate Acciona Energy. Lauren Engineers & Constructors (Abilene, TX) was the EPC contractor for the project. Acciona purchased a 55 percent stake in Solargenix (formerly Duke Solar), and Acciona owns 95 percent of the project. Nevada Solar One is unrelated to the Solar One power plant in California.

== History ==
In 2006, located 30 miles (48 km) north of Tucson, Arizona Public Service's Saguaro Solar Facility opened, with 1 MW of electrical generation capacity. Nevada Solar One went online for commercial use on June 27, 2007. It uses similar technology and was constructed over a period of 16 months. The total project site is approximately 400 acres (1.6 km^{2}; 0.63 mi^{2}), while the solar collectors cover 300 acres (1.2 km^{2}).

== Technology ==
Nevada Solar One uses proprietary technology to track the sun's location and concentrate its rays during peak demand hours. The plant uses 760 parabolic trough concentrators with more than 182,000 mirrors that concentrate the sun's rays onto more than 18,240 solar receivers placed at the focal axis of the troughs. These contain a heat transfer fluid that heats up to 735 °F (391 °C) and is used to produce steam that drives a Siemens SST-700 steam turbine, adapted to the specific requirements of the CSP technology, which is connected to a generator to produce electricity.

The mirrors are manufactured by Flabeg AG in Germany. In contrast to the power tower concentrator concept that California's original Solar One project uses. The specially coated tubes, made of glass and steel, were designed and produced by Solel Solar Systems as well as by Schott Glass in Germany. Motion control was supplied by Parker Hannifin, from components by Ansco Machine Company.

Solar thermal power plants designed for solar-only generation are well matched to summer noon peak loads in areas with significant cooling demands, such as the southwestern United States. Using thermal energy storage systems, solar thermal operating periods can be extended to meet base load needs. Given Nevada's land and sun resources, the state has the theoretical ability to have more than 600 GW of electrical generation capacity using solar thermal concentrators like those used by Nevada Solar One. It has been proposed that massive expansion of solar plants such as Nevada Solar One has the potential to provide sufficient electricity to power the entire United States.

Parabolic concentrator facilities have been successfully operating in California's Mojave Desert commercially since 1984, with a combined generating capacity of 354MW from the Solar Energy Generating Systems.

== Production ==
Nevada Solar One's production is as follows (values in GW·h).

Year	Solar	Fossil	Total
2007	41.21	0.38	41.59
2008	122.69	0.91	123.31
2009	120.65	2.43	123.07
2010	133.00	1.16	134.16
2011	128.26	1.99	130.26
2012	128.94	1.39	130.33
2013	112.79	2.31	115.10
2014	116.23	2.58	118.80
2015	105.65	2.14	107.79
2016	116.89	2.24	119.13
2017	118.03	2.58	120.60
2018	110.38	2.57	112.95

Fossil backup, night time preservation, and morning pre-heating, is provided by natural gas and provides up to 2% of total output.

Solar generation (MW·h) of Nevada Solar One
Year	Jan	Feb	Mar	Apr	May	Jun	Jul	Aug	Sep	Oct	Nov	Dec	Total
2007						1,876	8,827	10,251	10,186	6,075	3,101	896	41,212
2008	1,942	4,837	11,696	14,759	14,868	19,308	13,935	12,987	12,785	9,141	4,207	2,222	122,687
2009	2,239	3,971	11,982	13,920	16,096	11,638	13,839	16,117	13,314	8,754	5,838	2,940	120,648
2010	2,147	4,143	10,349	13,261	18,850	20,674	14,863	17,989	16,220	7,186	5,476	1,842	133,000
2011	3,137	6,370	8,772	14,625	16,516	20,698	13,698	16,732	10,752	9,420	4,333	3,210	128,263
2012	2,740	5,814	9,719	13,152	19,733	21,710	14,140	12,159	12,798	9,679	5,003	2,288	128,935
2013	2,641	7,023	10,355	14,613	17,063	18,402	10,552	10,166	5,149	9,382	4,142	3,302	112,790
2014	3,336	4,976	10,120	12,321	15,501	19,698	12,011	11,987	12,007	8,145	4,609	1,516	116,227
2015	2,051	6,375	9,993	13,982	9,993	15,337	12,565	11,308	9,221	6,684	5,624	2,519	105,652
2016	1,693	7,797	8,403	8,547	16,628	17,835	17,669	12,517	12,274	6,715	4,924	1,885	116,887
2017	2,560	3,876	10,683	13,305	16,753	19,672	10,770	13,111	10,236	9,839	3,908	3,312	118,025
2018	284	2,947	7,996	13,492	15,677	19,517	12,645	11,296	12,636	7,310	4,474	2,105	110,379
2019	2,041	4,185	9,035	10,898	12,168	16,321	15,335	15,317	10,316	9,736	3,583	1,306	110,241
2020	2,105	6,121	6,348	8,284	15,581	15,388	17,367	12,717	9,634	8,040	3,841	1,940	107,366
2021	882	5,565	8,056	13,261	16,038	12,173	8,571	11,918	8,601	5,466	3,761	1,417	95,709
2022	2,277	5,085	7,717	11,909	15,303	12,204	10,430	6,734	8,782	7,323	2,791	1,201	91,756
2023	1,706	3,105	4,942	11,597	12,823	12,973	13,971	9,485	8,149	7,474	3,319	1,759	91,303
Total (2007–2023)													1,851,080

== In popular culture ==
Nevada Solar One served as inspiration for the HELIOS One solar power plant's geographic location in the 2010 videogame Fallout: New Vegas.

== See also ==
- Copper Mountain Solar Facility
- Dish Stirling
- List of solar thermal power stations
- Renewable energy in the United States
- Renewable portfolio standard
- Solar power in Nevada
- Solar power plants in the Mojave Desert
- Solar power tower
- Solar thermal energy
