= Outline of solar energy =

Overview of and topical guide to solar energy

The following outline is provided as an overview of and topical guide to solar energy:

Solar energy is radiant light and heat from the Sun. It has been harnessed by humans since ancient times using a range of ever-evolving technologies. Modern day applications of solar energy technologies include solar heating, solar photovoltaics, solar thermal electricity and solar architecture. Today, these technologies serve as critical components for mitigation of global energy and environmental challenges.

== Overview ==
Solar energy can be described as all of the following:

- Energy – an indirectly observed quantity, often understood as the ability a physical system has to do work on other physical systems.
  - Renewable energy – energy which comes from natural resources which are naturally replenished.
- Natural resource – materials and components (something that can be used) that can be found within the environment. Every man-made product is composed of natural resources (at its fundamental level). A natural resource may exist as a separate entity such as fresh water, and air, as well as a living organism such as a fish, or it may exist in an alternate form which must be processed to obtain the resource such as metal ores, oil, and most forms of energy.
  - Renewable resource – natural resource with the ability to reproduce through biological or natural processes and are replenished with the passage of time.

=== Sunlight ===
- Sun – the star at the center of the Solar System
- Sunlight – in the broad sense, is the total frequency spectrum of electromagnetic radiation given off by the Sun, particularly infrared, visible, and ultraviolet light.

== History of solar energy ==
- Growth of photovoltaics –
- Timeline of solar cells – begins in the 19th century when it is observed that the presence of sunlight is capable of generating usable electrical energy.
- Timeline of solar energy –

== Conversion of solar energy ==
Solar power – the conversion of sunlight into electricity, either directly using photovoltaics (PV), or indirectly using concentrated solar power (CSP).

- Active solar – technologies are employed to convert solar energy into another more useful form of energy (for example, to heat or electrical energy).
- Heliostat – a device that includes a mirror, usually a plane mirror, which turns so as to keep reflecting sunlight toward a predetermined target, compensating for the Sun's apparent motions in the sky.
- Solar tracker – devices that orient various payloads toward the Sun.
- Role of copper in generating and transmitting energy with maximum efficiency in solar photovoltaic power generation, concentrating solar thermal power, and solar water heaters.
- Solar cell efficiency –
- Solar cell – made from a monocrystalline silicon wafer
- Solar chemical – a number of possible processes that harness solar energy by absorbing sunlight in a chemical reaction in a way similar to photosynthesis in plants but without using living organisms.
- Solar constant – a measure of flux density, it is the amount of incoming solar electromagnetic radiation per unit area that would be incident on a plane perpendicular to the rays, at a distance of one astronomical unit (AU) (roughly the mean distance from the Sun to the Earth).
- Solar inverter – or PV inverter, converts the variable direct current output of a photovoltaic (PV) solar panel into a utility frequency alternating current that can be fed into a commercial electrical grid or used by a local, off-grid electrical network.
- Solar photovoltaics –

=== Solar thermal energy ===
Solar thermal energy (STE) – technology for harnessing solar energy for thermal energy (heat).

- Solar district heating and solar district cooling. See: Seasonal thermal energy storage.
- Solar water heating (SWH) – or solar hot water (SHW) systems comprise several innovations and many mature renewable energy technologies that have been well established for many years.
- Solar air conditioning – any air conditioning (cooling) system that uses solar power.
- Thermal mass – a concept in building design regarding how the mass of the building provides "inertia" against temperature fluctuations, sometimes known as the thermal flywheel effect.
- Solar pond – a pool of saltwater which acts as a large-scale solar thermal energy collector with integral heat storage for supplying thermal energy.
- Solar chimney – solar chimney – often referred to as a thermal chimney – is a way of improving the natural ventilation of buildings by using convection of air heated by passive solar energy.

=== Concentrated solar power ===
Concentrated solar power – a system that uses mirrors or lenses to concentrate a large area of sunlight, or solar thermal energy, onto a small area. Electrical power is produced when the concentrated light is converted to heat, which drives a heat engine (usually a steam turbine) connected to an electrical power generator.

- Parabolic trough – a type of solar thermal energy collector.

=== Photovoltaics ===
Photovoltaics –

- Photoelectric effect – electrons are emitted from matter (metals and non-metallic solids, liquids or gases) as a consequence of their absorption of energy from electromagnetic radiation of very short wavelength, such as visible or ultraviolet radiation.
- Photovoltaics (PV) – is a method of generating electrical power by converting solar radiation into direct current electricity using semiconductors that exhibit the photovoltaic effect.
- Growth of photovoltaics – showing the history of installed photovoltaics.
- Timeline of solar cells – begins in the 19th century when it is observed that the presence of sunlight is capable of generating usable electrical energy.
- Solar insolation – a measure of solar radiation energy received on a given surface area and recorded during a given time. It is also called solar irradiation. Not to be confused with insulation.
- Solar constant – a measure of flux density, is the amount of incoming solar electromagnetic radiation per unit area that would be incident on a plane perpendicular to the rays, at a distance of one astronomical unit|astronomical unit (AU) (roughly the mean distance from the Sun to the Earth).
- Solar cell efficiency – the percentage of the solar energy to which the cell is exposed that is converted into electrical energy. Also referred to as "energy conversion efficiency".
- Third generation photovoltaic cell – are solar cells that are potentially able to overcome the Shockley-Queisser limit of 31-41% power efficiency for single bandgap solar cells.
- Solar cell research – in universities and research institutions around the world.
- Quantum efficiency of a solar cell –
- Cadmium telluride – a crystalline compound formed from cadmium and tellurium, used as an infrared optical window and a solar cell material.
- Thermophotovoltaic (TPV) – energy conversion is a direct conversion process from heat differentials to electricity via photons.
- Polycrystalline silicon photovoltaics – are a type of solar cell.
- Thermodynamic efficiency limit – the absolute maximum theoretically possible conversion efficiency of sunlight to electricity.
- Sun-free photovoltaics –
- Polarizing organic photovoltaics (ZOPV) – is a concept for harvesting energy from Liquid crystal display screens, developed by engineers from UCLA.
- Solar cell – made from a monocrystalline silicon wafer.
- Polymer solar cell – are a type of flexible solar cell.
- Nanocrystal solar cell – are solar cells based on a substrate with a coating of nanocrystals.
- Solar panel – (also solar module, photovoltaic module or photovoltaic panel) is a packaged, connected assembly of photovoltaic cells.
- Photovoltaic system – (PV system) use solar panels to convert sunlight into electricity.
- Photovoltaic power station – also known as a solar park or solar farm, is a large-scale photovoltaic system designed for the supply of merchant power into the electricity grid.

==== Photovoltaic system ====
Photovoltaic system –

===== Solar cells =====
- Solar cell – made from a monocrystalline silicon wafer
- Solar panel – (also solar module, photovoltaic module or photovoltaic panel) is a packaged, connected assembly of photovoltaic cells.
- Thin film solar cell – made by depositing one or more thin layers of photovoltaic material onto a thin substrate.
- Polymer solar cell – are a type of flexible solar cell.
- Nanocrystal solar cell – are solar cells based on a substrate with a coating of nanocrystals.
- Organic solar cell – a photovoltaic cell that uses organic electronics—a branch of electronics that deals with conductive organic polymers or small organic molecules.
- Quantum dot solar cell – are an emerging field in solar cell research that uses quantum dots as the photovoltaic material, as opposed to better-known bulk materials such as silicon, copper indium gallium selenide (CIGS) or CdTe.
- Hybrid solar cell – combine advantages of both organic and inorganic semiconductors.
- Plasmonic solar cell (PSC) – are a class of photovoltaic devices that convert light into electricity by using plasmons.
- Carbon nanotubes in photovoltaics –
- Dye-sensitized solar cell (DSC or DYSC) – is a low-cost solar cell belonging to the group of thin film solar cells.
- Cadmium telluride photovoltaics –
- Copper indium gallium selenide solar cells – a direct bandgap semiconductor useful for the manufacture of solar cells.
- Multijunction photovoltaic cell – tandem cells are solar cells containing several p-n junctions.
- Printed solar panel –

===== System components =====
- Solar charge controller –
- Solar inverter – or PV inverter, converts the variable direct current output of a photovoltaic (PV) solar panel into a utility frequency alternating current that can be fed into a commercial electrical grid or used by a local, off-grid electrical network.
- Solar micro-inverter – or micro inverter, converts direct current (DC) electricity from a single solar panel to alternating current (AC).
- Solar cable – the interconnection cable used in photovoltaic power generation.
- Solar combiner box – an electrical distribution box where the DC fuses or circuit breakers are placed.
- Photovoltaic mounting system – are used to fix solar panels on surfaces like roofs, empty plots etc.
- Maximum power point tracker –
- Solar tracker – devices that orient various payloads toward the Sun.
- Solar shingles – also called photovoltaic shingles, are solar cells designed to look like conventional asphalt shingles.
- Solar mirror § Photovoltaic augmentation –

===== System concepts =====
- Perturb and observe method –
- Incremental conductance method –
- Constant voltage method –
- Fill factor –
- Concentrated photovoltaics (CPV) – technology uses optics such as lenses to concentrate a large amount of sunlight onto a small area of solar photovoltaic materials to generate electricity.
- Photovoltaic thermal hybrid solar collector – sometimes known as hybrid PV/T systems or PVT, are systems that convert solar radiation into thermal and electrical energy.
- Space-based solar power – : Part of the solar energy is lost on its way through the atmosphere by the effects of reflection and absorption.
- Watt-peak – ) is a measure of the nominal power of a photovoltaic solar energy device under laboratory illumination conditions.

==== Photovoltaic power stations ====
Photovoltaic power station –

- Solar Energy Generating Systems –
- Stand-alone photovoltaic power system – : To store energy when an excess is available and to provide it when required.
- Grid-connected photovoltaic power system –
- Rooftop photovoltaic power station – a system which uses one or more photovoltaic panels, installed on rooftops of residential or commercial buildings, to convert sunlight into electricity.
- Topaz Solar Farm – a 550 megawatt (MW) solar photovoltaic power plant, being built in San Luis Obispo County, California.
- Solar Ark – one of the most famous solar buildings.
- Solar Umbrella house – a private residence in Venice, California, remodeled using active and passive solar design strategies to enable the house to function independent of the electrical grid.
- Erlasee Solar Park – also sometimes called the Gut Erlasee Solar Park, is a photovoltaic power station located in one of the sunniest regions of Germany.
- Guadarranque solar power plant – (also known as Cádiz solar power plant, Spanish: Parque Solar Guadarranque, or Planta Solar Guadarranque) is a photovoltaic solar power plant in the Guadarranque industrial park in San Roque, Cádiz, Spain.
- Pocking Solar Park – a photovoltaic solar power plant in Pocking, Lower-Bavaria, Germany.
- Copper Mountain Solar Facility – a 58 MW_{p} (48 megawatt MW AC) solar photovoltaic power plant in Boulder City, Nevada.
- Wyandot Solar Facility – a solar photovoltaic power plant completed in 2010, located in Salem Township, Wyandot County, Ohio.
- Kvthen Solar Park –
- Building-integrated photovoltaics – photovoltaic materials that are used to replace conventional building materials in parts of the building envelope such as the roof, skylights, or facades.
- Moura Photovoltaic Power Station – a large photovoltaic power station in Amareleja, in the municipality of Moura, Portugal. Also known as the Amareleja Photovoltaic Power Station.
- Nevada Solar One – a concentrated solar power plant, with a nominal capacity of 64 MW and maximum capacity of 75 MW, spread over an area of 400 acres.
- Panoche Valley Solar Farm – a proposed 399 MW photovoltaic power plant in San Benito County, California.
- Beneixama photovoltaic power plant – a 20 MW photovoltaic power plant located in Beneixama, Spain.
- Gottelborn Solar Park – also known as Solarpark Zeche Göttelborn, is an 8.
- Darro Solar Park – also referred to as Solarpark Darro, is a 5.
- Olmedilla Photovoltaic Park – a large photovoltaic power plant in Olmedilla de Alarcón, Spain.
- Blythe Photovoltaic Power Plant – the largest photovoltaic (PV) solar project in California.
- Strasskirchen Solar Park – the eighth largest photovoltaic power station in the world, with an installed capacity of 54 MW.
- Puertollano Photovoltaic Park – the fourth largest photovoltaic power station in the world, with a nominal capacity of 47.6 MW.
- Alamosa photovoltaic power plant – is an 8.22 MW photovoltaic power plant in Alamosa County, Colorado.
- Topaz Solar Farm – a 550 megawatt (MW) solar photovoltaic power plant, being built in San Luis Obispo County, California.

=== Experimental proposed solar power ===
- Solar updraft tower – a renewable-energy power plant for generating electricity from solar power.
- Solar-pumped laser – laser that shares the same optical properties as conventional lasers such as emitting a beam consisting of coherent electromagnetic radiation which can reach high power, but which uses solar radiation for pumping the lasing medium. This type of laser is unique from other types in that it does not require any artificial energy source.
- Thermoelectric generator – (also called thermogenerators) are devices which convert heat (temperature differences) directly into electrical energy, using a phenomenon called the "Seebeck effect" (or "thermoelectric effect").
- Solar chemical – a number of possible processes that harness solar energy by absorbing sunlight in a chemical reaction in a way similar to photosynthesis in plants but without using living organisms.
- Space-based solar power – : Part of the solar energy is lost on its way through the atmosphere by the effects of reflection and absorption.
- Solar sail – (also called light sails or photon sails) are a form of spacecraft propulsion using the radiation pressure (also called solar pressure) of light from a star to push large ultra-thin mirrors to high speeds.
- Magnetic sail – or magsail is a proposed method of spacecraft propulsion which would use a static magnetic field to deflect charged particles radiated by the Sun as a plasma wind, and thus impart momentum to accelerate the spacecraft.
- Solar thermal rocket – a theoretical spacecraft propulsion system that would make use of solar power to directly heat reaction mass, and therefore would not require an electrical generator like most other forms of solar-powered propulsion do.

=== Economics and politics of solar power ===
- Cost of electricity by source – a calculation of the cost of generating electricity at the point of connection to a load or electricity grid.
- Duck curve – graphs the mismatch between peak power load on the grid and hourly solar and wind energy production.
- Financial incentives for photovoltaics – are incentives offered to electricity consumers to install and operate solar-electric generating systems, also known as photovoltaics (PV).
- Net metering – an electricity policy for consumers who own (generally small) renewable energy facilities (such as wind, solar power or home fuel cells) or V2G electric vehicles.
- Feed-in tariff – standard offer contract advanced renewable tariff or renewable energy payments) is a policy mechanism designed to accelerate investment in renewable energy technologies.

==== Solar power by country ====
- Solar power by country – many industrialized nations are installing significant solar power capacity in their grids as a supplement or alternative to other power sources. Long distance transmission allows remote renewable energy resources to be used to displace fossil fuel consumption.
  - Solar power in Australia – growth in the amount of installed PV capacity in Australia has been dramatic with a 10-fold increase between 2009 and 2011. Feed-in tariffs and mandatory renewable energy targets designed to assist renewable energy commercialisation in Australia have largely been responsible for the rapid increase.
  - Solar power in Canada – Canada has many regions that are sparsely populated and difficult to access. Photovoltaic (PV) cells are increasingly used as standalone units, mostly as off-grid distributed electricity generation to power remote homes, telecommunications equipment, oil and pipeline monitoring stations and navigational devices.
  - Solar power in China – China has over 400 photovoltaic (PV) companies. In 2007 China produced 1.7 GW of solar panel capacity, nearly half of the world production of 3.8 GW, although 99% was exported.
  - Solar power in the European Union – During 2010, the European solar heating yield was 17.3 TWh, annual turnover was 2.6 Billion € and employment was 33,500 persons (1 job for 80 kW new capacity).
    - Solar power in Germany – in 2011, solar PV provided 18 TWh (billion kilowatt-hours) of electricity in Germany, about 3% of its total electricity capacity.
    - Solar power in Italy – ranked among the world's largest producers of electricity from solar power with an installed photovoltaic nameplate capacity of 12,750 MW at the end of 2011 and 263,594 plants in operation as of 18 August 2011.
    - Solar power in Portugal –
      - Serpa solar power plant –
      - Moura Photovoltaic Power Station –
    - Solar power in Romania – had in 2007 an installed capacity of 0.
    - Solar power in Spain – one of the most advanced countries in the development of solar energy, and it is one of the European countries with the most hours of sunshine. Spain is the fourth largest manufacturer in the world of solar power technology and exports 80 percent of this output to Germany.
      - Olmedilla Photovoltaic Park – photovoltaic power plant in Olmedilla de Alarcón, Spain, with 270,000 solar photovoltaic panels generating 60 megawatts (peak). It produces enough electricity to power more than 40,000 homes.
    - Solar power in the United Kingdom – with a total installed generating capacity of 750 megawatts (MW).
  - Solar power in India – already a leader in wind power generation, India is planning to produce 20 GW of solar power by 2020.
  - Solar power in Israel – with no oil reserves and the country's tenuous relations with its oil-rich neighbors, the search for a stable source of energy is a national priority. Solar technology in Israel has advanced to the point where it is almost cost-competitive with fossil fuels.
  - Solar power in Japan – a leading manufacturer of solar panels and is in the top 5 ranking for countries with the most solar PV installed.
  - Solar power in Pakistan –
  - Solar power in the United States – an area of considerable activity and there are many utility-scale solar power plants.
  - Solar power in Turkey –

== Storage of solar energy ==
- Grid energy storage – (also called large-scale energy storage) refers to the methods used to store electricity on a large scale within an electrical power grid.
- Thermal energy storage – This is a wide range of technologies that store heat or cold for later use, either in the short-term or interseasonally.

- Thermal mass – a concept in building design regarding how the mass of the building provides "inertia" against temperature fluctuations, sometimes known as the thermal flywheel effect.
- Seasonal thermal energy storage - a collection of technologies for storing sensible heat, and large storages are capable of storage between opposing seasons with acceptably small heat losses. Technologies include: (1) Aquifer thermal energy storage, involving from a doublet of injection and extraction wells (each half being one or more wells) in a deep, contained aquifer; (2) A mass of native geological stratas (gravel, bedrock, etc.), thermally accessed via a cluster of small-diameter, heat exchanger equipped boreholes typically several hundred feet deep; (3) gravel/water-filled shallow pits, lined and top-insulated; and (4) large tank built on the surface, insulated and covered with earth berms.
- Phase change material – a substance with a high heat of fusion which, melting and solidifying at a certain temperature, is capable of storing and releasing large amounts of energy. Heat is absorbed or released when the material changes from solid to liquid and vice versa; thus, PCMs are classified as latent heat storage (LHS) units.

== Applications of solar energy ==
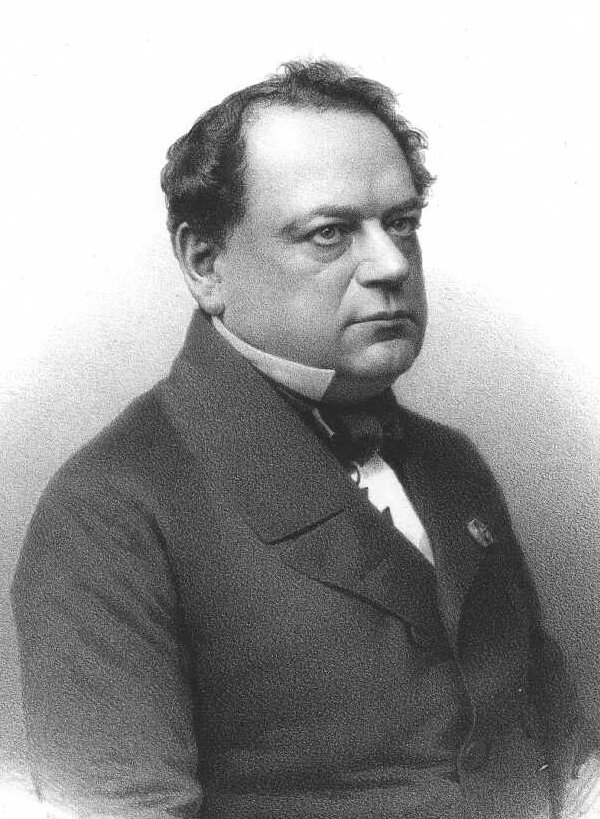

- Solar balloon – a balloon that gains buoyancy when the air inside is heated by the Sun's radiation, usually with the help of black or dark balloon material.

=== Agriculture ===
- Greenhouse – (also called a glasshouse) is a building in which plants are grown.
- Polytunnel – a tunnel made of polyethylene used to grow plants that require a higher temperature and/or humidity than that which is available in the environment.
- Row cover – (or cloche) any material used as a protective covering to shield plants, usually vegetables, primarily from the undesirable effects of cold and wind, and also from insect damage.
- Solar-powered pump – an off-the-grid system made up of solar panels, its controller and a pump

=== Appliances ===
- Solar-powered refrigerator – An appliance to keep food or other things cool; runs on energy directly obtained from the Sun.
- Solar air conditioning – To keep buildings cool; runs on energy directly obtained from the Sun.
- Solar lamp – a portable light fixture composed of an LED lamp, a photovoltaic solar panel, and a rechargeable battery.
- Solar charger – employs solar energy to supply electricity to devices or charge batteries.
- Solar backpack – a cloth sack carried on one's back and secured with two straps that go over the shoulders, equipped with thin film solar cells and batteries.
- Solar tree – a decorative means of obtaining solar energy.
- Solar-powered pump – a pump running on electricity generated by photovoltaics. The operation of solar-powered pumps is more economical and has less environmental impact than pumps powered by an internal combustion engine (ICE).
- Solar-powered watch – partly or wholly powered by solar cells integrated within the watch face.
- Solar Tuki – a portable solar lamp unit with white LED bulbs designed to provide rural Nepal with an alternative to traditional kerosene tukis, their main current source of night-time illumination.
- Photovoltaic keyboard – a wireless computer keyboard that charges its batteries from a light source such as the Sun or interior lighting, addressing a major drawback of wireless computer peripherals that otherwise require regular replacement of discharged batteries.
- Solar road stud – maintenance-free flashing lighting devices powered by solar cellsand used in road construction to delineate road edges and centre lines.
- Solar cell phone charger – uses solar panels to charge cell phone batteries.
- Solar notebook – a laptop with powerful batteries that are recharged by a solar panel attached to the notebook.
- Solar-powered calculator – hand-held electronic calculators powered by photovoltaic panels mounted on the device.
- Solar-powered fountain – an electrical fountain powered by a solar panel.
- Solar-powered radio – a portable radio receiver powered by photovoltaic panels.
- Solar-powered flashlight – flashlights powered by solar energy stored in rechargeable batteries.
- Solar-powered fan – a mechanical fan powered by solar panels.
- Solar street light – raised light sources which are powered by photovoltaic panels generally mounted on the lighting structure.
- Solar traffic light – a signalling device powered by solar panels positioned at road intersections, pedestrian crossings and other locations to control the flow of traffic.

=== Building ===
- Passive solar building design – windows, walls, and floors are made to collect, store, and distribute solar energy in the form of heat in the winter and reject solar heat in the summer.
- Building-integrated photovoltaics – photovoltaic materials are used to replace conventional building materials in parts of the building envelope such as the roof, skylights, facades, or bri-soleil.
- Urban heat island (UHI) – is a metropolitan area which is significantly warmer than its surrounding rural areas due to the modification of land surfaces, and waste heat from buildings and transportation.

=== Lighting ===
- Hybrid solar lighting (HSL) – or hybrid lighting systems combine the use of solar with artificial light for interior illumination by channelling sunlight through fiber optic cable bundles to provide solar light into rooms without windows or skylights, and by supplementing this natural light with artificial—typically LED—light as required.
- Solar lamp – a portable light fixture composed of an LED lamp, a photovoltaic solar panel, and a rechargeable battery.
- Solar Tuki – a portable solar lamp unit with white LED bulbs designed to provide rural Nepal with an alternative to traditional kerosene tukis, their main current source of night-time illumination.
- Light tube – or light pipes are used for transporting or distributing natural or artificial light.
- Daylighting – the practice of placing windows or other openings and reflective surfaces so that during the day natural light provides effective internal lighting.

=== Process heat ===
- Solar pond – a pool of saltwater which acts as a large-scale solar thermal energy collector with integral heat storage for supplying thermal energy.
- Solar furnace – a structure that uses concentrated solar power to produce high temperatures, usually for industry.
- Salt evaporation pond – also called salterns or salt pans, are shallow artificial ponds designed to produce salts from sea water or other brines.

=== Solar cooking ===
- Solar cooker – or solar oven, is a device which uses the energy of sunlight to heat food or drink to cook it or sterilize it.

=== Solar disinfection ===
- Solar water disinfection – also known as SODIS is a method of disinfecting water using only sunlight and plastic PET bottles.
- Soil solarization – an environmentally friendly method of using solar power for controlling disease agents in the soil by mulching the soil and covering it with tarp, usually with a transparent polyethylene cover, to trap solar energy.

=== Solar-powered desalination ===
- Solar desalination – a technique to desalinate water using solar energy.
- Solar still – a low-tech way of distilling water, powered by the heat of the sun (more precisely, the heat & humidity of the soil, and relative cool of the plastic).
- Desalination – desalinization, or desalinisation refers to any of several processes that remove some amount of salt and other minerals from saline water.

=== Solar water heating ===
- Solar water heating (SWH) – or solar hot water (SHW) systems comprise several innovations and many mature renewable energy technologies that have been well established for many years.
- Solar combisystem – provides both solar space heating and cooling as well as hot water from a common array of solar thermal collectors, usually backed up an auxiliary non-solar heat source.
- Solar controller – an electronic device that turns on and off power to the circulating pump in a solar water heater.

=== Solar-powered transport ===
- Electric boat – were popular from the 1880s
- Electric aircraft – an aircraft that runs on electric motors rather than internal combustion engines, with electricity coming from fuel cells, solar cells, ultracapacitors, power beaming, or batteries.
- Solar vehicle – an electric vehicle powered completely or significantly by direct solar energy.

==== Land transport ====
- Solar vehicle – an electric vehicle powered completely or significantly by direct solar energy.
- Solar car – a solar vehicle used for land transport.
- Solar roadway – a road surface that generates electricity by solar photovoltaics.
- Solar golf cart – are golf carts powered by mounting a photovoltaic (PV) or thin film panel on top of the existing roof or using a PV panel as the roof itself.
- The Quiet Achiever – also known as the BP Solar Trek, was the world's first practical solar-powered car built to be driven by a person for long distances and powered solely by photovoltaic solar cells with no other back-up power source (i.
- Sunmobile – was a model of a solar-powered automobile.

==== Air transport ====
- Electric aircraft – an aircraft that runs on electric motors rather than internal combustion engines, with electricity coming from fuel cells, solar cells, ultracapacitors, power beaming, or batteries.
- Mauro Solar Riser – an American biplane ultralight electric aircraft that was the first crewed aircraft to fly on solar power.
- Solar panels on spacecraft – spacecraft in the inner Solar System use solar panels for power.
- Solar-Powered Aircraft Developments Solar One –
- Gossamer Penguin – was a solar-power experimental aircraft created by Paul MacCready's AeroVironment.
- Qinetiq Zephyr – a lightweight solar-powered UAV which was originally designed and built by the QQ1 "Edge of Space" team who were sponsored by the United Kingdom defence firm, Qinetiq.
- Solar Challenger – was a solar-powered electric aircraft designed by Paul MacCready's AeroVironment.

==== Water transport ====
- Solar powered boat – Photovoltaic power, temporarily stored in accumulator batteries, is used to drive a propeller via an electric motor.

==== Solar vehicle racing ====
- Solar car racing – competitive races of electric vehicles which are powered by solar energy obtained from solar panels on the surface of the car (solar cars).
- List of solar car teams – listed by country.
- Blue Sky Solar Racing – a student-run initiative at the University of Toronto
- Frisian Solar Challenge – a 137 miles (220 km) solar boat race.
- Hunt-Winston School Solar Car Challenge – an annual solar-powered car race for predominantly American high school students.
- North American Solar Challenge (ASC) – previously known as Sunrayce, the American Solar Challenge, and the North American Solar Challenge, is a solar car race across the United States and Canada.
- Solar challenge (disambiguation) –
- Solar Cup – an eco-boating competition in Temecula, California.
- Solar Splash – an intercollegiate solar-electric boat competition dedicated to showing the feasibility of solar energy.
- South African Solar Challenge – an alternative fuel vehicle auto racing challenge in South Africa, with classes for hybrid vehicles, electric vehicles, solar vehicles, and biofuel-powered vehicles.
- Tour de Sol – in Switzerland was the first rally for solar-powered vehicles.
- UC Solar Team – a multi-disciplinary student based team at the University of Calgary established to design and build a solar car to compete in the American Solar Challenge (ASC; previously named the North American Solar Challenge) and the World Solar Challenge (WSC).
- Victorian Model Solar Vehicle Challenge – a competition held annually at Scienceworks in Melbourne, Victoria, Australia.
- World Solar Challenge – a solar-powered car race which covers 3,021 km (1,877 mi) through the Australian outback, from Darwin to Adelaide.

== Solar energy organizations ==
- Agency for Non-conventional Energy and Rural Technology
- The Alliance for Solar Choice
- Targray
- Eurosolar
- Fraunhofer Institute for Solar Energy Systems
- Institute of Energy Conversion
- International Solar Energy Society
- International Solar Alliance
- Solar Academy International
- Solar Energy Industries Association

== Solar energy publications ==
- Solar Energy

== Persons influential in solar energy ==
- Armin Aberle
- Andrew Blakers
- Max Deml
- Tom Dinwoodie
- David Faiman
- Hans-Josef Fell
- Charles Fritts – was the American inventor credited with creating the first working solar cell in 1883.
- Calvin Fuller – was a physical chemist at AT&T Bell Laboratories where he worked for 37 years from 1930 to 1967. Fuller was part of a team in basic research that found answers to physical challenges.
- Adolf Goetzberger
- Martin Green (professor)
- Harish Hande
- Denis Hayes
- Abram Ioffe – was a prominent Russian/Soviet physicist. Ioffe was an expert in electromagnetism, radiology, crystals, high-impact physics, thermoelectricity and photoelectricity.
- Darren Kimura
- Stefan Krauter
- Jeremy Leggett
- Reiner Lemoine
- Auguste Mouchout – the French inventor of the first device that directly converted solar energy into mechanical power.
- David Mills (solar researcher)
- Augustin Mouchot
- Elon Musk
- Brian Norton (engineer)
- Monica Oliphant
- Ron Pernick
- T. Boone Pickens
- Phil Radford
- Lyndon Rive
- Horace de Saussure – A Swiss geologist, physicist and Alpine traveller; considered to be the first person to build a successful solar oven.
- Sunny Sanwar
- Hermann Scheer
- Wolfgang Scheffler – the inventor/promoter of Scheffler Reflectors, large, flexible parabolic reflecting dishes that concentrate sunlight for solar cooking in community kitchens, bakeries, etc. and in the world's first solar-powered crematorium.
- Jigar Shah
- Shi Zhengrong
- Frank Shuman
- Jeff Siegel
- Ursula Sladek
- Don Stephens
- James Strock
- William C. Tauber
- Félix Trombe
- Francois Villette
- Clint Wilder
- Roland Winston

== See also ==
- List of countries by photovoltaics production –
- List of photovoltaics companies –
- Air mass coefficient –
- Andasol solar power station –
- Artificial photosynthesis – a chemical process that replicates the natural process of photosynthesis, a process that converts sunlight, water, and carbon dioxide into carbohydrates and oxygen.
- AstroFlight Sunrise – was an uncrewed experimental electric aircraft technology demonstrator and the first aircraft to fly on solar power.
- Auroville – (City of Dawn) is an "experimental" township in Viluppuram district in the state of Tamil Nadu, India, near Pondicherry in South India.
- BP Solar – a subsidiary of BP, was a manufacturer and installer of photovoltaic solar cells headquartered in Madrid, Spain, with production facilities in India and the People's Republic of China.
- BrightSource Energy – an Oakland, California, corporation that designs, builds, finances, and operates utility-scale solar power plants.
- Central solar heating plant –
- Community solar farm – or solar garden is a solar power installation that accepts capital from and provides credit for the output and tax benefits to individual and other investors.
- Compact linear Fresnel reflector (CLFR) – also referred to as a concentrating linear Fresnel reflector – is a specific type of linear Fresnel reflector (LFR) technology.
- Concentrating photovoltaics –
- Concentrating solar power –
- Copper in solar photovoltaic power generation –
- Crookes radiometer – also known as the light mill, consists of an airtight glass bulb, containing a partial vacuum.
- Daylighting – the practice of placing windows or other openings and reflective surfaces so that during the day natural light provides effective internal lighting.
- Deployment of solar power to energy grids –
- Desertec – a concept proposed by the DESERTEC Foundation for making use of solar energy and wind energy.
- Drake Landing Solar Community (DLSC) – is a planned community in Okotoks, Alberta, Canada, equipped with a central solar heating system and other energy efficient technology.
- Dye-sensitized solar cell – DSC or DYSC) is a low-cost solar cell belonging to the group of thin film solar cells.
- Effect of sun angle on climate – as the angle at which sunlight strikes the Earth varies by location, time of day, and season due to the Earth's orbit around the Sun and the Earth's rotation around its tilted axis.
- Energy tower (downdraft) –
- EURO-SOLAR Programme –
- European Photovoltaic Industry Association (EPIA) – is the world's largest solar photovoltaic (PV) industry association, representing around 95 percent of the European photovoltaic industry and 80 percent of the worldwide PV industry.
- Feed-in tariff – standard offer contract advanced renewable tariff or renewable energy payments) is a policy mechanism designed to accelerate investment in renewable energy technologies.
- First Solar –
- Fresnel reflector –
- Geomagnetic storm – a temporary disturbance of the Earth's magnetosphere caused by a disturbance in the interplanetary medium.
- Global dimming – the gradual reduction in the amount of global direct irradiance at the Earth's surface that was observed for several decades after the start of systematic measurements in the 1950s.
- Green house –
- Halo (optical phenomenon) –
- Helioseismology – the study of the propagation of wave oscillations, particularly acoustic pressure waves, in the Sun.
- Hybrid solar lighting (HSL) – or hybrid lighting systems combine the use of solar with artificial light for interior illumination by channelling sunlight through fiber optic cable bundles to provide solar light into rooms without windows or skylights, and by supplementing this natural light with artificial—typically LED—light as required.
- Insolation – a measure of solar radiation energy received on a given surface area and recorded during a given time.
- Installed solar power capacity –
- ISE –
- Ivanpah Solar Power Facility – is a solar thermal power project currently under construction in the California Mojave Desert, 40 miles (60 km) southwest of Las Vegas, with a planned capacity of 392 megawatts (MW).
- List of photovoltaic power stations – that are larger than 25 MW in current net capacity.
- List of photovoltaics companies – top 10 solar module playersSolar modules, as the final products to be installed to generate electricity, are regarded as the major components to be selected by customers willing to choose solar PV energy.
- List of solar thermal power stations –
- Magnetic sail – or magsail is a proposed method of spacecraft propulsion which would use a static magnetic field to deflect charged particles radiated by the Sun as a plasma wind, and thus impart momentum to accelerate the spacecraft.
- Moura photovoltaic power station –
- Nanocrystal solar cell – are solar cells based on a substrate with a coating of nanocrystals.
- Nevada Solar One – a concentrated solar power plant, with a nominal capacity of 64 MW and maximum capacity of 75 MW, spread over an area of 400 Acres.
- North American Solar Challenge (ASC) –, previously known as Sunrayce, the American Solar Challenge, and the North American Solar Challenge, is a solar car race across the United States and Canada.
- Parabolic reflector – (or dish or mirror) is a reflective device used to collect or project energy such as light, sound, or radio waves.
- Passive house – located in Darmstadt, Germany.
- Passive solar –
- Photosynthesis – a process used by plants and other organisms to capture the sun's energy to split off water's hydrogen from oxygen.
- Photovoltaic array – a power generating unit of modules and panels that convert solar radiation or energy from the sun into electricity.
- Photovoltaic cell –
- Photovoltaic module –
- Photovoltaic plant –
- Photovoltaic system (PV system) – uses solar panels to convert sunlight into electricity.
- Photovoltaic thermal hybrid solar collector – sometimes known as hybrid PV/T systems or PVT, are systems that convert solar radiation into thermal and electrical energy.
- Photovoltaics in transport –
- Photovoltaics (PV) – is a method of generating electrical power by converting solar radiation into direct current electricity using semiconductors that exhibit the photovoltaic effect.
- Polymer solar cell – are a type of flexible solar cell.
- Polytunnel – a tunnel made of polyethylene used to grow plants that require a higher temperature and/or humidity than that which is available in the environment.
- PS10 solar power tower –
- PV financial incentives –
- Rechargeable batteries –
- Right to light – a form of easement in English law that gives a long-standing owner of a building with windows a right to maintain the level of illumination.
- Row cover – (or cloche) is any material used as a protective covering to shield plants, usually vegetables, primarily from the undesirable effects of cold and wind, and also from insect damage.
- Salt evaporation pond – also called salterns or salt pans, are shallow artificial ponds designed to produce salts from sea water or other brines.
- Sandia National Laboratories – managed and operated by the Sandia Corporation (a wholly owned subsidiary of Lockheed Martin Corporation), are two major United States Department of Energy research and development national laboratories.
- Seasonal thermal energy storage – (also known as a seasonal heat storage or interseasonal thermal storage) is the use of a thermal repository (sometimes very large) to, for example, retain solar heat acquired during the hot summer months to provide heating during colder winter weather in and individual building or district heating system. The use of other time-mismatched thermal source such winter's cold or waste heat can also be enabled with STES technologies.
- SEGS –
- Soil solarization – an environmentally friendly method of using solar power for controlling disease agents in the soil by mulching the soil and covering it with tarp, usually with a transparent polyethylene cover, to trap solar energy.
- Solar air conditioning – any air conditioning (cooling) system that uses solar power.
- Solar and Heliospheric Observatory (SOHO) – is a spacecraft built by a European industrial consortium led by Matra Marconi Space (now Astrium) that was launched on a Lockheed Martin Atlas IIAS launch vehicle on December 2, 1995 to study the Sun, and has discovered over 2200 comets.
- Solar architecture – the integration of solar panel technology with modern building techniques.
- Solar azimuth angle –
- Solar balloon – a balloon that gains buoyancy when the air inside is heated by the solar radiation|sun's radiation, usually with the help of black or dark balloon material.
- Solar bowl –
- Solar box cooker –
- Solar car – a solar vehicle used for land transport.
- Solar cell research – in universities and research institutions around the world.
- Solar Challenger – was a solar-powered electric aircraft designed by Paul MacCready's AeroVironment.
- Solar chimney – solar chimney — often referred to as a thermal chimney — is a way of improving the natural ventilation of buildings by using convection of air heated by passive solar energy.
- Solar collector –
- Solar cooker – or solar oven, is a device which uses the energy of sunlight to heat food or drink to cook it or sterilize it.
- Solar cooling –
- Solar cycle – (or solar magnetic activity cycle) has a period of about 11 years.
- Solar Decathlon – an international competition that challenges 20 collegiate teams to design, build, and operate the most attractive, effective, and energy-efficient solar-powered house.
- Solar design –
- Solar easement – a right, expressed as an easement, restriction, covenant, or condition contained in any deed, contract, or other written instrument executed by or on behalf of any landowner for the purpose of assuring adequate access to direct sunlight for solar energy systems.
- Solar eclipse – occurs when the Moon passes between the Sun and the Earth, and the Moon fully or partially blocks the Sun.
- Solar Energy Generating Systems –
- Solar flare – a sudden brightening observed over the Sun's surface or the solar limb, which is interpreted as a large energy release of up to 6 × 10^{25} joules of energy.
- Solar flower tower –
- Solar furnace – a structure that uses concentrated solar power to produce high temperatures, usually for industry.
- Solar greenhouse (technical) –
- Solar heating –
- Solar hot water in Australia – heated using natural energy from the sun.
- Solar hot water –
- Solar inverter – or PV inverter, converts the variable direct current output of a photovoltaic (PV) solar panel into a utility frequency alternating current that can be fed into a commercial electrical grid or used by a local, off-grid electrical network.
- Solar lamp – a portable light fixture composed of a LED lamp, a photovoltaic solar panel, and a rechargeable battery.
- Solar maximum – or solar max is the period of greatest solar activity in the solar cycle of the Sun.
- Solar minimum – the period of least solar activity in the solar cycle of the Sun.
- Solar mirror – a reflective surface used for gathering and reflecting solar energy in a system being powered by solar energy.
- Solar nebula –
- Solar neon – neon that has been made in the Sun and transmitted to Earth as ions in the solar wind.
- Solar Orbiter – (SolO) is a planned Sun-observing satellite, under development by the European Space Agency (ESA).
- Solar oven –
- Solar photovoltaics –
- Solar pond – a pool of saltwater which acts as a large-scale solar thermal energy collector with integral heat storage for supplying thermal energy.
- Solar power plants in the Mojave Desert – which supply power to the electricity grid.
- Solar power satellite –
- Solar power tower – also known as 'central tower' power plants or 'heliostat' power plants or power towers, is a type of solar furnace using a tower to receive the focused sunlight.
- Solar-powered desalination unit – a device capable of harnessing energy from the sun to produce portable water from saline water through direct or indirect methods.
- Solar prominence – a large, bright feature extending outward from the Sun's surface, often in a loop shape.
- Solar proton event – (or proton storm) occurs when protons emitted by the Sun become accelerated to very high energies either close to the Sun during a solar flare or in interplanetary space by the shocks associated with coronal mass ejections.
- Solar radiation pressure –
- Solar radiation –
- Solar Riser –
- Solar sail – (also called light sails or photon sails) are a form of spacecraft propulsion using the radiation pressure (also called solar pressure) of light from a star to push large ultra-thin mirrors to high speeds.
- Solar savings fraction – or solar fraction (f) is the amount of energy provided by the solar technology divided by the total energy required.
- Solar shingles – also called photovoltaic shingles, are solar cells designed to look like conventional asphalt shingles.
- Solar thermal collector – a solar collector designed to collect heat by absorbing sunlight.
- Solar thermal electricity –
- Solar Total Energy Project (STEP) – was the world's first and largest solar thermal cogeneration project having an industrial application.
- Solar variation theory –
- Solar variation – the change in the amount of radiation emitted by the Sun (see Solar radiation) and in its spectral distribution over years to millennia.
- Solar vehicle – an electric vehicle powered completely or significantly by direct solar energy.
- Solar water disinfection – also known as SODIS is a method of disinfecting water using only sunlight and plastic PET bottles.
- Solar water heating (SWH) – or solar hot water (SHW) systems comprise several innovations and many mature renewable energy technologies that have been well established for many years.
- Solar-charged vehicle –
- Solarium – similar to a sunroom, a room built largely of glass to afford exposure to the sun.
- Solnova Solar Power Station – a large CSP power station made up of five separate units of 50 MW each.
- Sopogy – a solar thermal technology supplier was founded in 2002 at the Honolulu, Hawaii-based clean technology incubator.
- South African Solar Challenge – an alternative fuel vehicle auto racing challenge in South Africa, with classes for hybrid vehicles, electric vehicles, solar vehicles, and biofuel-powered vehicles.
- Space-based solar power – : Part of the solar energy is lost on its way through the atmosphere by the effects of reflection and absorption.
- Sun tanning – or simply tanning is the process whereby skin color is darkened or tanned.
  - Sunburn – a burn to living tissue, such as skin, which is produced by overexposure to ultraviolet (UV) radiation, commonly from the sun's rays.
  - Sunscreen – (also commonly known as sunblock, sun tan lotion, sun screen, sun cream or block out) is a lotion, spray, gel or other topical product that absorbs or reflects some of the sun's ultraviolet (UV) radiation on the skin exposed to sunlight and thus helps protect against sunburn.
- Sunshade –
- Total spectrum solar concentrator – a device used to optimise the efficiency of solar power.
- Trombe wall – a sun-facing wall separated from the outdoors by glass and an air space, which absorbs solar energy and releases it selectively towards the interior at night.
- The Solar Project – consists of the Solar One, Solar Two and Solar Tres solar thermal power plants based in the Mojave Desert, USA and AndalucÃa, Spain.
