= World Bank Development Marketplace Award =

American grant program

The World Bank Development Marketplace (DM) Award is a competitive grant program administered by the World Bank. Since 1998, the DM has awarded more than $46 million to some 1,000 early-stage, innovative projects worldwide.

Projects are selected based on:

- Innovation
- Potential for Growth
- Visible benefits
- Realism
- Sustainability

== Development Marketplace Award winners ==
- 2000: Roundabout PlayPump.
- 2003: "HotPot" solar oven by Solar Household Energy, Inc. (SHE) and Fondo Mexicano para la Conservacion de la Naturaleza (FMCN).
- 2003: Kanchan Arsenic Filter Project for Rural Nepal. See also Amy B. Smith.
- 2004: Scojo Foundation for Reading Glasses for the Poor in India.
- 2005: Solar Tuki
- 2007: Small portable "Weza" electric generator for rural Rwanda.
- 2008: UV Bucket for killing bacteria in water in rural Mexico, by Florence Cassassuce.

=== Full Listings ===
- Winners of 2000 Development Marketplace
- Winners of 2002 Development Marketplace
- Winners of 2003 Development Marketplace
- Winners of 2005 Development Marketplace
- Winners of 2006 Development Marketplace

== See also ==
- List of economics awards
