= The Alliance for Solar Choice =

- Formation: April 23, 2013; 13 years ago
- Legal status: LLC
- Headquarters: United States
- Region served: United States
- Chairman: Bryan Miller
- Website: www.allianceforsolarchoice.com

The Alliance for Solar Choice (TASC) leads rooftop solar power advocacy efforts across the United States. Founded by the largest rooftop solar energy companies in the United States of America, TASC represents the vast majority of the rooftop solar market. Its members include: Demeter Power Group, SunTime Energy, Geostellar, Inc., LGCY Power, Sunrun, and Solar Universe.

== Activities ==
TASC member companies are responsible for thousands of jobs and hundreds of thousands of rooftop solar installations on homes, schools, businesses, and government buildings across the country. According to recent Center for American Progress (CAP) studies, rooftop solar systems are now seeing overwhelming adoption in middle-class neighborhoods with median incomes ranging from $40,000 to $90,000.

== Overview ==
=== EEI Publishes "Disruptive Challenges" ===
In January 2013, the utility trade association Edison Electric Institute (EEI) issued a report titled “Disruptive Challenges: Financial Implications and Strategic Responses to a Changing Retail Electric Business”. The report describes the increasing popularity of consumer-driven rooftop solar, energy efficiency, and demand response as a “vicious cycle.” It details how utilities view rooftop solar as a “disruption” to their current business model, which guarantees utilities specific profit margins from large infrastructure projects funded by ratepayers. Peter Kind of Energy Infrastructure Advocates, the author of the report, makes recommendations on how electric utilities can defend against these ‘disruptive challenges.’ TASC and others in the solar industry have been working since 2013 to defend against utility attacks on core rooftop solar policies across the country.

=== Net Energy Metering and Opposition to Solar ===
Net energy metering, or ‘NEM’, provides full retail credit to residents, businesses, schools, and other public agencies when their solar systems export surplus energy to the grid. The utility then ends up selling this surplus energy to other customers nearby. Utility companies typically oppose widespread NEM adoption and have attempted to block the growth of rooftop solar usage, a strategy reported by the press.

Another utility strategy in opposition to solar has been to introduce legislation to monopolize the rooftop solar market. In 2014, utilities in South Carolina and Washington pushed legislation with this intention. TASC successfully lead efforts to defeat both attempts.

=== VOSTs, FITs and Their Weaknesses ===
Utilities also advocate for Value of Solar Tariffs (VOSTs) and Feed-in Tariffs (FITs). As revealed by national law firm Skadden, Arps, Slate, Meagher and Flom LLP, VOSTs create hidden taxes for consumers. In addition, VOSTs create annual market uncertainty that can hurt solar businesses, and they eliminate a customer’s right to actually use the power they generate. This right to use the power produced from solar panels on-site is philosophically important for many solar customers. With VOSTs and FITs, utilities control a homeowner’s solar energy. The homeowner has to sell all of their solar power to the utility as it’s produced. They buy all of the electricity they consume from the utility. The utility determines the price the homeowner receives for the solar power, and the homeowner – as indicated by the Skadden tax memo from – could be required to pay taxes on these payments. The payment price fluctuates according to utility calculations, so it is unpredictable from year to year.

=== Barclays PLC Downgrade ===
Following the recent, concerted attacks from utilities, in May 2014, Barclays PLC downgraded the entire electric utility sector due to a confluence of declining cost trends in distributed solar photovoltaic (PV) power generation and because residential-scale power storage is likely to disrupt the status quo. The Barclays report highlights that "regulators are ultimately answerable to voters, and the latter are unlikely to tolerate a long halt in their ability to access a clearly beneficial product."

== Member Companies ==
The founding members of TASC represent the vast majority of the nation’s rooftop solar market and include Demeter Power Group, Silevo, SolarCity, Solar Universe, Sunrun, and ZEP Solar.

== Leadership ==
Sunrun SVP of Public Policy Bryan Miller is the Chairman of The Alliance for Solar Choice.
