= Solar Tuki =

Type of home lighting

A solar tuki is a rechargeable solar lighting system that was implemented in Nepal to replace kerosene lamps commonly used by villagers. It includes two lamps that have white LED lights powered by an individual solar panel. In 2004, Engineers Anil Chitrakar and Babu Raj Shrestha collaborated with their respective organizations, Environmental Camps for Conservation Awareness and Centre for Renewable Energy, to produce, distribute, and further the development of the solar tuki in Nepal. Their organizations sell the solar tuki systems, including solar panel, for US$28, and the individual lamp is sold for $11.

== Components ==
The typical solar tuki unit includes a 3 watt solar panel that charges a battery (NiMH or Li-ion) connected to two 0.4 watt white LED lamps. In addition to being used as a lamp the solar tuki also has the capability to power a radio, and charge a mobile phone. An added feature that can be utilized is a chlorinator, which is used to treat water. The charging time of the lamps vary by how long the solar panel is kept in the sun, and the strength of the sunlight on a given day. Anil Chitrakar, co founder and developer of solar tukis, claims that the lamp can work for up to ten hours when charged in the sun all day long.

== Development ==
The research and development of the Solar Tuki was supported by the Swedish International Development Cooperation Agency and help from the Asian Institute of Technology. It was developed from May 1999 until the final model of the Solar Tuki was completed in December 2003.

The organizations that advocated the growth of the solar tuki in Nepal are the Centre for Renewable Energy (CRE) and Environmental Camps for Conservation Awareness (ECCA). These two organizations have worked together since the establishment of the solar tuki program in 2004. The advancement of ECCA's and CRE's efforts in Nepal were funded primarily by the multiple awards and competitions that have been endowed by several environmentally aware agencies. These endowments have been allocated by the Global Environment Facility, who donated $50,00, and the World Bank Development Marketplace Award, which granted ECCA another $92,00.

=== ECCA's involvement ===
Environmental Camps for Conservation has been the leader in influencing the availability of the solar tuki in Nepal. They have influenced other organizations, like CRE, to work together to provide the cheapest solar tuki to distribute to poor Nepalis. Since the solar tuki project's formation, there have been over 130,000 solar tuki lamps distributed throughout Nepal.

==== Marketing ====
ECCA created a micro financing system in order to reach even the poorest individuals. The system allows people to pay $2.30 per month for two years. This pricing includes a 5-year warranty and services to repair the lantern if damaged. They have set up the market to encourage outside entrepreneurs to compete in the distribution of solar tuki's. ECCA did this purposefully to make cheaper solar tuki units available from competitors, while lowering their sales in Nepal. ECCA has service centers in Kathmandu and Eastern Nepal to help local entrepreneurs learn how to build solar tukis and give advice on business aspects of starting an energy enterprise, such as natural resource management. Over 13 local manufacturers take part in constructing and selling the solar tuki in different areas of Nepal.

==== Community centers ====
To further help the poorer villages, ECCA has set up community charging stations. These charging centers allow the community members to charge their lamp units from one large 36-50 watt photovoltaic solar panel. One 50 watt solar panel can charge up to 40 lamps at once. The idea behind these community charging stations is that villagers will only have to pay the $11 for the lamp, instead of $28 for the lamp and solar panel.

They have also set up buildings called service centers. Service centers serve as a place where villagers can go to have maintenance and replacements done to their tukis. ECCA trains individuals on repairing the solar lamps so that help can always be available at the service centers. Manufacturers provide the service centers with spare parts for repairs.

== Impact ==
The solar tuki was created to be used as a tool to improve the quality of life for the Nepali people. Its various functions has helped the people in many aspects of their lives. Criticisms of the solar tuki have been on the cost of the technology. Even with maximum efforts to reduce costs, the price is still considered high for poverty stricken villages. Some villagers do not see it necessary to invest in the solar tuki if they already own a source of light (kerosene lamp).

=== Health and economic benefits ===
With the solar tuki replacing the traditional kerosene lamps, the health of individuals has improved due to the lack of smoke produced. Previously, soot from the kerosene lamps had caused eye irritation and coughing. Fire safety has also improved due to the lack of a flame inside households. With the absence of kerosene in the solar tuki, villagers save considerable amounts of time which they would spend acquiring fuel. Monthly expenses which would be spent on fuel are also saved, allowing villagers to allocate their earnings toward other necessities. The introduction of the solar tuki market has strengthened the economy of rural Nepal. Employment opportunities became available as businesses began manufacturing and distributing tuki's.

=== Educational benefits ===
The brightness of the LED bulbs illuminates small areas better than the kerosene lamp, which helps people with tasks such as cooking and studying at night. Some schools in Nepal give students a solar tuki lamp unit in order for them to study at night. This requires the students to come back to school in order to charge their tukis, which has increased student attendance. The ability to power a small radio from the solar panel provides unlimited use, without worrying about electricity costs. Therefore, villagers can have access to important information and be updated about current events.
