= Organic solar cell =

Type of photovoltaic

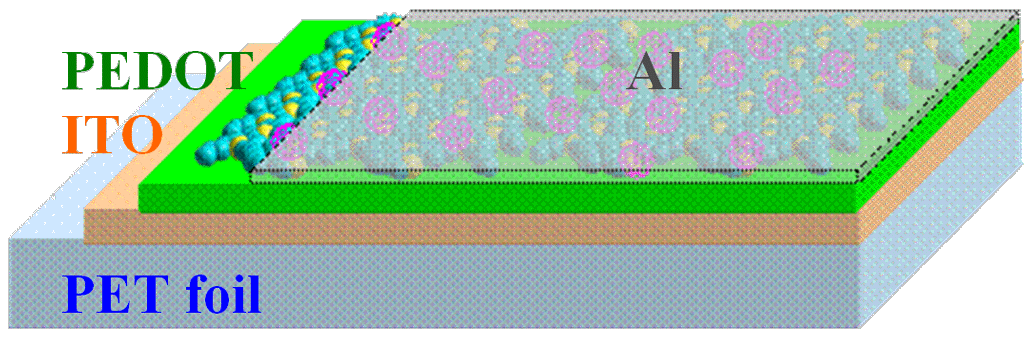
Fig. 1. Schematic of plastic solar cells. PET – polyethylene terephthalate, ITO – indium tin oxide, PEDOT:PSS – poly(3,4-ethylenedioxythiophene), active layer (usually a polymer:fullerene blend), Al – aluminium.

An organic solar cell (OSC) or plastic solar cell is a type of photovoltaic that uses organic electronics, a branch of electronics that deals with conductive organic polymers or small organic molecules, for light absorption and charge transport to produce electricity from sunlight by the photovoltaic effect. Most organic photovoltaic cells are polymer solar cells.

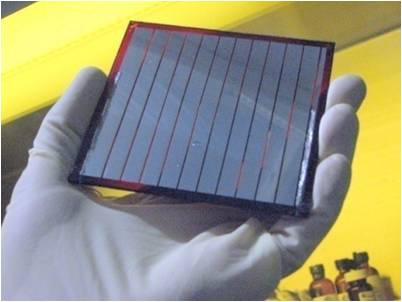
Fig. 2. Organic Photovoltaic manufactured by the company Solarmer.

The molecules used in organic solar cells are solution-processable at high throughput and are cheap, resulting in low production costs to fabricate a large volume. Combined with the flexibility of organic molecules, organic solar cells are potentially cost-effective for photovoltaic applications. Molecular engineering (e.g., changing the length and functional group of polymers) can change the band gap, allowing for electronic tunability. The optical absorption coefficient of organic molecules is high, so a large amount of light can be absorbed with a small amount of materials, usually on the order of hundreds of nanometers. The main disadvantages associated with organic photovoltaic cells are low efficiency, low stability and low strength compared to inorganic photovoltaic cells such as silicon solar cells.

Compared to silicon-based devices, polymer solar cells are lightweight (which is important for small autonomous sensors), potentially disposable and inexpensive to fabricate (sometimes using printed electronics), flexible, customizable on the molecular level and potentially have less adverse environmental impact. Polymer solar cells also have the potential to exhibit transparency, suggesting applications in windows, walls, flexible electronics, etc. An example device is shown in Fig. 1. The disadvantages of polymer solar cells are also serious: they offer about 1/3 of the efficiency of hard materials, and experience substantial photochemical degradation.

Polymer solar cells' stability problems, combined with their promise of low costs and potential for increasing efficiencies have made them a popular field in solar cell research. In 2015, polymer solar cells were achieving efficiencies of more than 10% via a tandem structure. In 2023, a new record-breaking efficiency of 19.3% was achieved by Hong Kong Polytechnic University.

== Physics ==
Fig. 3: Examples of organic photovoltaic materials

A photovoltaic cell is a specialized semiconductor diode that converts light into direct current (DC) electricity. Depending on the band gap of the light-absorbing material, photovoltaic cells can also convert low-energy, infrared (IR) or high-energy, ultraviolet (UV) photons into DC electricity. A common characteristic of both the small molecules and polymers (Fig. 3) used as the light-absorbing material in photovoltaics is that they all have large conjugated systems. A conjugated system is formed where carbon atoms covalently bond with alternating single and double bonds. These hydrocarbons' electrons pz orbitals delocalize and form a delocalized bonding π orbital with a π* antibonding orbital. The delocalized π orbital is the highest occupied molecular orbital (HOMO), and the π* orbital is the lowest unoccupied molecular orbital (LUMO). In organic semiconductor physics, the HOMO takes the role of the valence band while the LUMO serves as the conduction band. The energy separation between the HOMO and LUMO energy levels is considered the band gap of organic electronic materials and is typically in the range of 1–4 eV.

All light with energy greater than the band gap of the material can be absorbed, though there is a trade-off to reducing the band gap as photons absorbed with energies higher than the band gap will thermally give off their excess energy, resulting in lower voltages and power conversion efficiencies. When these materials absorb a photon, an excited state is created and confined to a molecule or a region of a polymer chain. The excited state can be regarded as an exciton, or an electron-hole pair bound together by electrostatic interactions. In photovoltaic cells, excitons are broken up into free electron-hole pairs by effective fields. The effective fields are set up by creating a heterojunction between two dissimilar materials. In organic photovoltaics, effective fields break up excitons by causing the electron to fall from the conduction band of the absorber to the conduction band of the acceptor molecule. It is necessary that the acceptor material has a conduction band edge that is lower than that of the absorber material.

Fig. 4: Polymer chain with diffusing polaron surrounded by fullerene molecules

Polymer solar cells usually consist of an electron- or hole-blocking layer on top of an indium tin oxide (ITO) conductive glass followed by electron donor and an electron acceptor (in the case of bulk heterojunction solar cells), a hole or electron blocking layer, and metal electrode on top. The nature and order of the blocking layers – as well as the nature of the metal electrode – depends on whether the cell follows a regular or an inverted device architecture. In an inverted cell, the electric charges exit the device in the opposite direction as in a normal device because the positive and negative electrodes are reversed. Inverted cells can utilize cathodes out of a more suitable material; inverted OPVs enjoy longer lifetimes than regularly structured OPVs, and they usually show higher efficiencies compared with the conventional counterparts.

In bulk heterojunction polymer solar cells, light generates excitons. Subsequent charge separation in the interface between an electron donor and acceptor blend within the device's active layer. These charges then transport to the device's electrodes where the charges flow outside the cell, perform work and then re-enter the device on the opposite side. The cell's efficiency is limited by several factors, especially non-geminate recombination. Hole mobility leads to faster conduction across the active layer.

Organic photovoltaics are made of electron donor and electron acceptor materials rather than semiconductor p-n junctions. The molecules forming the electron donor region of organic PV cells, where exciton electron-hole pairs are generated, are generally conjugated polymers possessing delocalized π electrons that result from carbon p orbital hybridization. These π electrons can be excited by light in or near the visible part of the spectrum from the molecule's highest occupied molecular orbital (HOMO) to the lowest unoccupied molecular orbital (LUMO), denoted by a π -π* transition. The energy bandgap between these orbitals determines which wavelength(s) of light can be absorbed.

Unlike in an inorganic crystalline PV cell material, with its band structure and delocalized electrons, excitons in organic photovoltaics are strongly bound with an energy between 0.1 and 1.4 eV. This strong binding occurs because electronic wave functions in organic molecules are more localized, and electrostatic attraction can thus keep the electron and hole together as an exciton. The electron and hole can be dissociated by providing an interface across which the chemical potential of electrons decreases. The material that absorbs the photon is the donor, and the material acquiring the electron is called the acceptor. In Fig. 4, the polymer chain is the donor and the fullerene is the acceptor. Even after dissociation, the electron and hole may still be joined as a "geminate pair", and an electric field is then required to separate them. The electron and hole must be collected at contacts. If charge carrier mobility is insufficient, the carriers will not reach the contacts, and instead recombine at trap sites or remain in the device as undesirable space charges that oppose the flow of new carriers. The latter problem can occur if electron and hole mobilities are not matched. In that case, space-charge limited photocurrent (SCLP) hampers device performance.

Organic photovoltaics can be fabricated with an active polymer and a fullerene-based electron acceptor. Illumination of this system by visible light leads to electron transfer from the polymer to a fullerene molecule. As a result, the formation of a photoinduced quasiparticle, or polaron (P^{+}), occurs on the polymer chain and the fullerene becomes a radical anion (C^{−}_{60}). Polarons are highly mobile and can diffuse away.

== Junction types ==
In organic solar cells, junctions are the interfaces between different layers or materials within the device's structure. These interfaces contribute to the separation and collection of charge carriers (electrons and holes) that are generated when sunlight is absorbed. The properties and structures of these junctions affects the efficiency, stability, and overall performance of organic solar cells.

The simplest organic PV device features a planar heterojunction (Fig. 1). A film of organic active material (polymer or small molecule), of electron donor or electron acceptor type is sandwiched between contacts. Excitons created in the active material may diffuse before recombining and separate, hole and electron diffusing to its specific collecting electrode. Because charge carriers have diffusion lengths of just 3–10 nm in typical amorphous organic semiconductors, planar cells must be thin, but the thin cells absorb light less well. Bulk heterojunctions (BHJs) address this shortcoming. In a BHJ, a blend of electron donor and acceptor materials is cast as a mixture, which then phase-separates. Regions of each material in the device are separated by only several nanometers, a distance suited for carrier diffusion. BHJs require sensitive control over materials morphology on the nanoscale. Important variables include materials, solvents and the donor-acceptor weight ratio.

The next logical step beyond BHJs are ordered nanomaterials for solar cells, or ordered heterojunctions (OHJs). OHJs minimize the variability associated with BHJs. OHJs are generally hybrids of ordered inorganic materials and organic active regions. For example, a photovoltaic polymer can be deposited into pores in a ceramic such as TiO_{2}. Since holes still must diffuse the length of the pore through the polymer to a contact, OHJs suffer similar thickness limitations. Mitigating the hole mobility bottleneck is key to further enhancing device performance of OHJ's.

=== Single layer ===
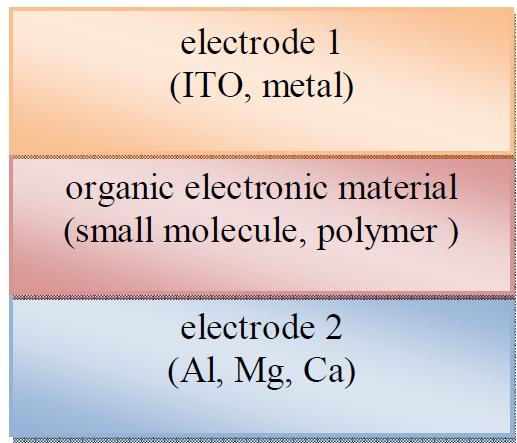
Fig. 5: Sketch of a single layer organic photovoltaic cell

Single layer organic photovoltaic cells are the simplest form. These cells are made by sandwiching a layer of organic electronic materials between two metallic conductors, typically a layer of indium tin oxide (ITO) with high work function and a layer of low work function metal such as Aluminum, Magnesium or Calcium. The basic structure of such a cell is illustrated in Fig. 5.

The difference of work function between the two conductors sets up an electric field in the organic layer. When the organic layer absorbs light, electrons will be excited to the LUMO and leave holes in the HOMO, thereby forming excitons. The potential created by the different work functions helps to split the exciton pairs, pulling electrons to the positive electrode (an electrical conductor used to make contact with a non-metallic part of a circuit) and holes to the negative electrode.

==== Examples ====
In 1958 the photovoltaic effect or the creation of voltage of a cell based on magnesium phthalocyanine (MgPc)—a macrocyclic compound having an alternating nitrogen atom-carbon atom ring structure—was discovered to have a photovoltage of 200 mV. An Al/MgPc/Ag cell obtained photovoltaic efficiency of 0.01% under illumination at 690 nm.

Conjugated polymers were also used in this type of photovoltaic cell. One device used polyacetylene (Fig. 1) as the organic layer, with Al and graphite, producing an open-circuit voltage of 0.3 V and a charge collection efficiency of 0.3%. An Al/poly(3-nethyl-thiophene)/Pt cell had an external quantum yield of 0.17%, an open-circuit voltage of 0.4 V and a fill factor of 0.3. An ITO/PPV/Al cell showed an open-circuit voltage of 1 V and a power conversion efficiency of 0.1% under white-light illumination.

==== Issues ====
Single layer organic solar cells do not work well. They have low quantum efficiencies (<1%) and low power conversion efficiencies (<0.1%). A major problem with them is that the electric field resulting from the difference between the two conductive electrodes is seldom sufficient to split the excitons. Often the electrons recombine with the holes without reaching the electrode.

=== Bilayer ===
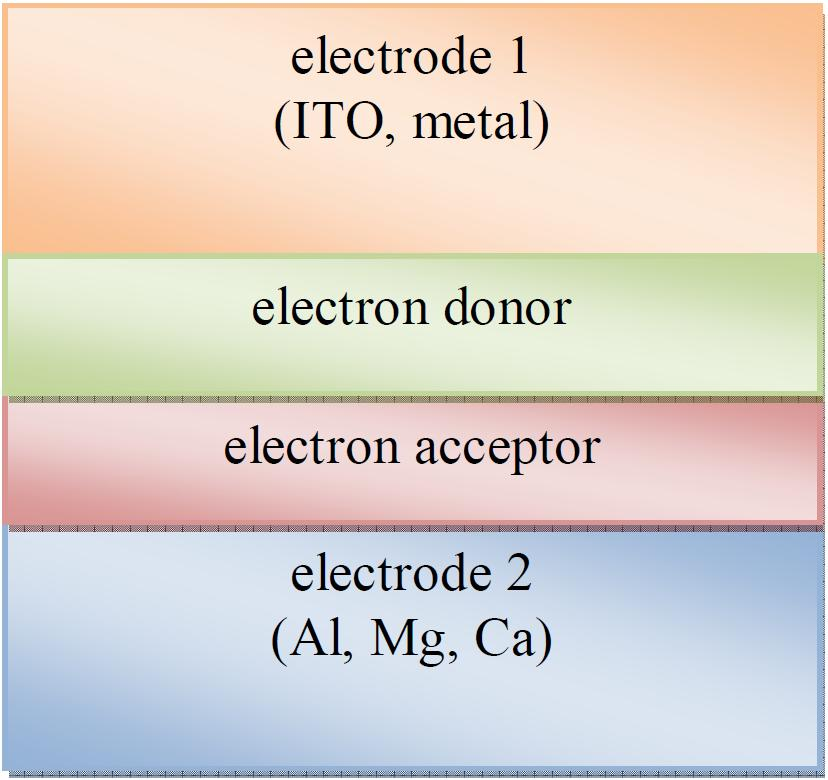
Fig. 6: Sketch of a multilayer organic photovoltaic cell.

Bilayer cells contain two layers in between the conductive electrodes (Fig. 6). The two layers have different electron affinity and ionization energies, therefore electrostatic forces are generated at the interface between the two layers. Light must create excitons in this small charged region for an efficient charge separation and collecting. The materials are chosen to make the differences large enough that these local electric fields are strong, which splits excitons much more efficiently than single layer photovoltaic cells. The layer with higher electron affinity and ionization potential is the electron acceptor, and the other layer is the electron donor. This structure is also called a planar donor-acceptor heterojunction.

==== Examples ====
C_{60} has high electron affinity, making it a good acceptor. A C_{60}/MEH-PPV double layer cell had a relatively high fill factor of 0.48 and a power conversion efficiency of 0.04% under monochromatic illumination. PPV/C_{60} cells displayed a monochromatic external quantum efficiency of 9%, a power conversion efficiency of 1% and a fill factor of 0.48.

Perylene derivatives display high electron affinity and chemical stability. A layer of copper phthalocyanine (CuPc) as electron donor and perylene tetracarboxylic derivative as electron acceptor, fabricating a cell with a fill factor as high as 0.65 and a power conversion efficiency of 1% under simulated AM2 illumination. Halls et al. fabricated a cell with a layer of bis(phenethylimido) perylene over a layer of PPV as the electron donor. This cell had peak external quantum efficiency of 6% and power conversion efficiency of 1% under monochromatic illumination, and a fill factor of up to 0.6.

==== Issues ====
The diffusion length of excitons in organic electronic materials is typically on the order of 10 nm. In order for most excitons to diffuse to the interface of layers and split into carriers, the layer thickness should be in the same range as the diffusion length. However, a polymer layer typically needs a thickness of at least 100 nm to absorb enough light. At such a large thickness, only a small fraction of the excitons can reach the heterojunction interface.

=== Discrete heterojunction ===
A three-layer (two acceptor and one donor) fullerene-free stack achieved a conversion efficiency of 8.4%. The implementation produced high open-circuit voltages and absorption in the visible spectra and high short-circuit currents. Quantum efficiency was above 75% between 400 nm and 720 nm wavelengths, with an open-circuit voltage around 1 V.

=== Bulk heterojunction ===
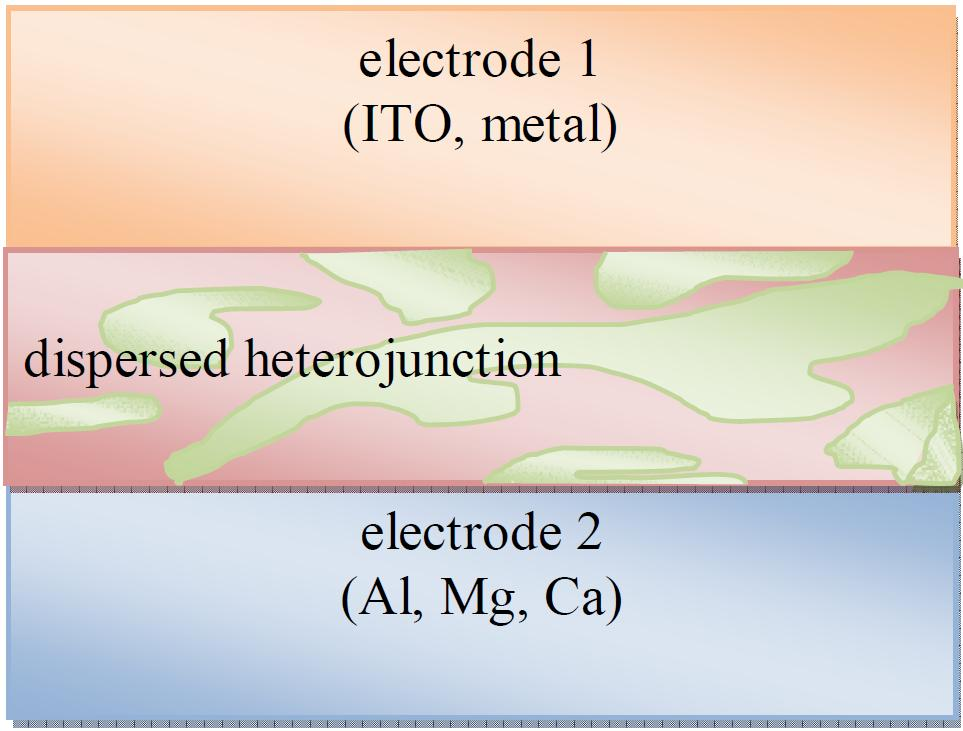
Fig. 7: Sketch of a dispersed junction photovoltaic cell

Bulk heterojunctions have an absorption layer consisting of a nanoscale blend of donor and acceptor materials. The domain sizes of this blend are on the order of nanometers, allowing for excitons with short lifetimes to reach an interface and dissociate due to the large donor-acceptor interfacial area. However, efficient bulk heterojunctions need to maintain large enough domain sizes to form a percolating network that allows the donor materials to reach the hole transporting electrode (Electrode 1 in Fig. 7) and the acceptor materials to reach the electron transporting electrode (Electrode 2). Without this percolating network, charges might be trapped in a donor or acceptor rich domain and undergo recombination. Bulk heterojunctions have an advantage over layered photoactive structures because they can be made thick enough for effective photon absorption without the difficult processing involved in orienting a layered structure while retaining similar level of performances.

Bulk heterojunctions are most commonly created by forming a solution containing the two components, casting (e.g., drop casting and spin coating) and then allowing the two phases to separate, usually with the assistance of an annealing step. The two components will self-assemble into an interpenetrating network connecting the two electrodes. They are normally composed of a conjugated molecule based donor and fullerene based acceptor. The nanostructural morphology of bulk heterojunctions tends to be difficult to control, but is critical to photovoltaic performance.

After the capture of a photon, electrons move to the acceptor domains, then are carried through the device and collected by one electrode, and holes move in the opposite direction and collected at the other side. If the dispersion of the two materials is too fine, it will result in poor charge transfer through the layer.

Most bulk heterojunction cells use two components, although three-component cells have been explored. The third component, a secondary p-type donor polymer, acts to absorb light in a different region of the solar spectrum. This in theory increases the amount of absorbed light. These ternary cells operate through one of three distinct mechanisms: charge transfer, energy transfer or parallel-linkage.

In charge transfer, both donors contribute directly to the generation of free charge carriers. Holes pass through only one donor domain before collection at the anode. In energy transfer, only one donor contributes to the production of holes. The second donor acts solely to absorb light, transferring extra energy to the first donor material. In parallel linkage, both donors produce excitons independently, which then migrate to their respective donor/acceptor interfaces and dissociate.

==== Examples ====
Fullerenes such as C_{60} and its derivatives are used as electron acceptor materials in bulk heterojunction photovoltaic cells. A cell with the blend of MEH-PPV and a methano-functionalized C_{60} derivative as the heterojunction, ITO and Ca as the electrodes showed a quantum efficiency of 29% and a power conversion efficiency of 2.9% under monochromatic illumination. Replacing MEH-PPV with P3HT produced a quantum yield of 45% under a 10 V reverse bias. Further advances in modifying the electron acceptor has resulted in a device with a power conversion efficiency of 10.61% with a blend of PC_{71}BM as the electron acceptor and PTB7-Th as the electron donor.

Polymer/polymer blends are also used in dispersed heterojunction photovoltaic cells. A blend of CN-PPV and MEH-PPV with Al and ITO as the electrodes, yielded peak monochromatic power conversion efficiency of 1% and fill factor of 0.38.

Dye sensitized photovoltaic cells can also be considered important examples of this type.

Issues

Fullerenes such as PC_{71}BM are often the electron acceptor materials found in high performing bulk heterojunction solar cells. However, these electron acceptor materials very weakly absorb visible light, decreasing the volume fraction occupied by the strongly absorbing electron donor material. Furthermore, fullerenes have poor electronic tunability, resulting in restrictions placed on the development of conjugated systems with more appealing electronic structures for higher voltages. Recent research has been done on trying to replace these fullerenes with organic molecules that can be electronically tuned and contribute to light absorption.

=== Graded heterojunction ===
The electron donor and acceptor are mixed in such a way that the gradient is gradual. This architecture combines the short electron travel distance in the dispersed heterojunction with the advantage of the charge gradient of the bilayer technology.

==== Examples ====
A cell with a blend of CuPc and C_{60} showed a quantum efficiency of 50% and a power conversion efficiency of 2.1% using 100 mW/cm^{2} simulated AM1.5G solar illumination for a graded heterojunction.

=== Continuous junction ===
Similar to the graded heterojunction the continuous junction concept aims at realizing a gradual transition from an electron donor to an electron acceptor. However, the acceptor material is prepared directly from the donor polymer in a post-polymerization modification step.

== Production ==
Since its active layer largely determines device efficiency, this component's morphology received much attention.

If one material is more soluble in the solvent than the other, it will deposit first on top of the substrate, causing a concentration gradient through the film. This has been demonstrated for poly-3-hexyl thiophene (P3HT), phenyl-C_{61}-butyric acid methyl ester (PCBM) devices where the PCBM tends to accumulate towards the device's bottom upon spin coating from ODCB solutions. This effect is seen because the more soluble component tends to migrate towards the "solvent rich" phase during the coating procedure, accumulating the more soluble component towards the film's bottom, where the solvent remains longer. The thickness of the generated film affects the phases segregation because the dynamics of crystallization and precipitation are different for more concentrated solutions or faster evaporation rates (needed to build thicker devices). Crystalline P3HT enrichment closer to the hole-collecting electrode can only be achieved for relatively thin (100 nm) P3HT/PCBM layers.

The gradients in the initial morphology are then mainly generated by the solvent evaporation rate and the differences in solubility between the donor and acceptor inside the blend. This dependence on solubility has been clearly demonstrated using fullerene derivatives and P3HT. When using solvents which evaporate at a slower rate (as chlorobenzene (CB) or dichlorobenzene (DCB)) you can get larger degrees of vertical separation or aggregation while solvents that evaporate quicker produce a much less effective vertical separation. Larger solubility gradients should lead to more effective vertical separation while smaller gradients should lead to more homogeneous films. These two effects were verified on P3HT:PCBM solar cells.

The solvent evaporation speed as well as posterior solvent vapor or thermal annealing procedures were also studied. Blends such as P3HT:PCBM seem to benefit from thermal annealing procedures, while others, such as PTB7:PCBM, seem to show no benefit. In P3HT the benefit seems to come from an increase of crystallinity of the P3HT phase which is generated through an expulsion of PCBM molecules from within these domains. This has been demonstrated through studies of PCBM miscibility in P3HT as well as domain composition changes as a function of annealing times.

The above hypothesis based on miscibility does not fully explain the efficiency of the devices as solely pure amorphous phases of either donor or acceptor materials never exist within bulk heterojunction devices. A 2010 paper suggested that current models that assume pure phases and discrete interfaces might fail given the absence of pure amorphous regions. Since current models assume phase separation at interfaces without any consideration for phase purity, the models might need to be changed.

The thermal annealing procedure varies depending on precisely when it is applied. Since vertical species migration is partly determined by the surface tension between the active layer and either air or another layer, annealing before or after the deposition of additional layers (most often the metal cathode) affects the result. In the case of P3HT:PCBM solar cells vertical migration is improved when cells are annealed after the deposition of the metal cathode.

Donor or acceptor accumulation next to the adjacent layers might be beneficial as these accumulations can lead to hole or electron blocking effects which might benefit device performance. In 2009 the difference in vertical distribution on P3HT:PCBM solar cells was shown to cause problems with electron mobility which ends up with the yielding of very poor device efficiencies. Simple changes to device architecture – spin coating a thin layer of PCBM on top of the P3HT – greatly enhance cell reproducibility, by providing reproducible vertical separation between device components. Since higher contact between the PCBM and the cathode is required for better efficiencies, this largely increases device reproducibility.

According to neutron scattering analysis, P3HT:PCBM blends have been described as "rivers" (P3HT regions) interrupted by "streams" (PCBM regions).

=== Progress in growth techniques ===
Mostly organic films for photovoltaic applications are deposited by spin coating and vapor-phase deposition. However each method has certain draw backs, spin coating technique can coat larger surface areas with high speed but the use of solvent for one layer can degrade the already existing polymer layer. Another problem is related with the patterning of the substrate for device as spin-coating results in coating the entire substrate with a single material.

=== Vacuum thermal evaporation ===
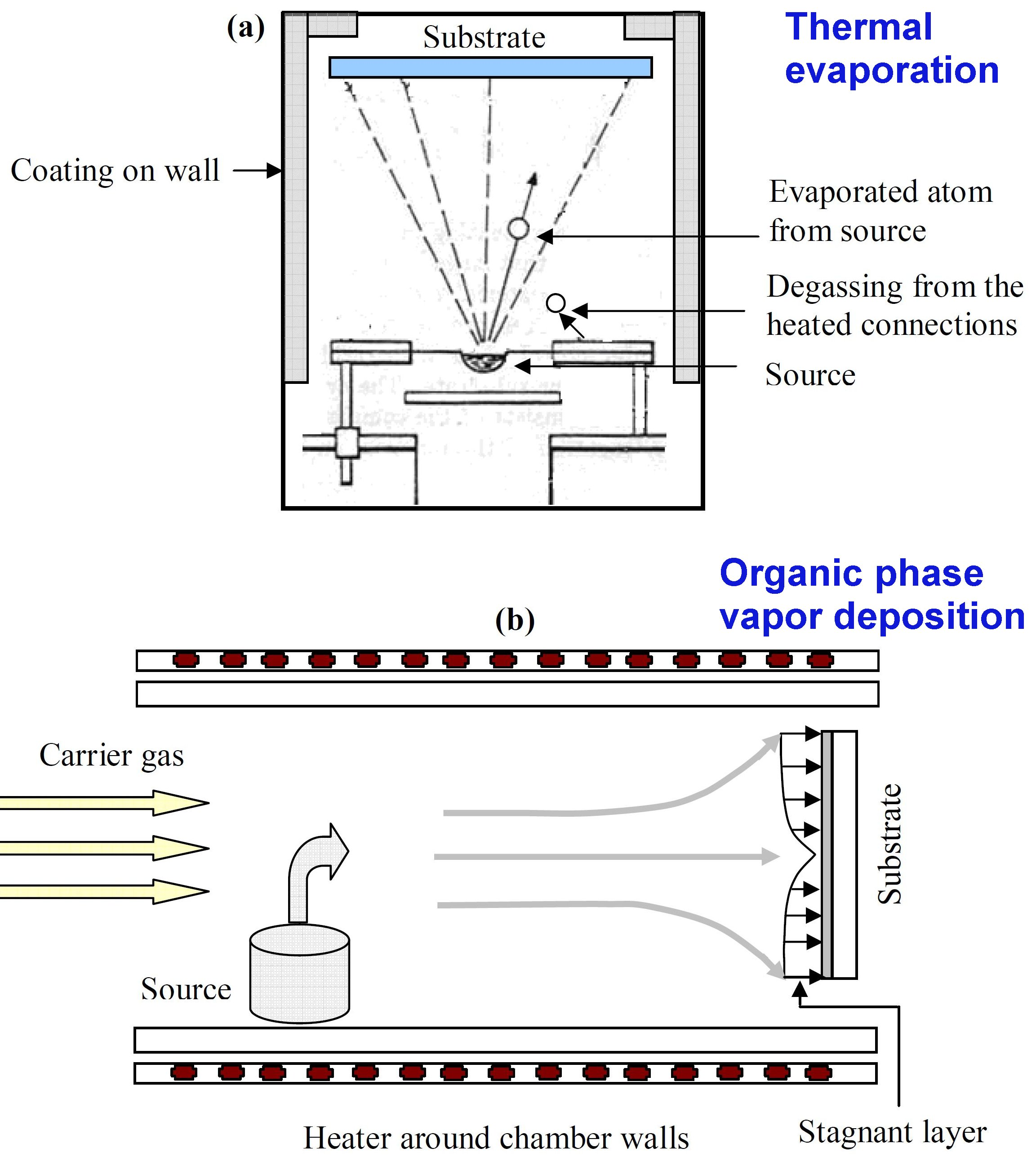
Fig. 9: Vacuum thermal evaporation (a) and organic phase vapor deposition (b)

Another deposition technique is vacuum thermal evaporation (VTE) which involves the heating of an organic material in vacuum. The substrate is placed several centimeters away from the source so that evaporated material may be directly deposited onto the substrate, as shown in Fig. 9(a). This method is useful for depositing many layers of different materials without chemical interaction between different layers. However, there are sometimes problems with film-thickness uniformity and uniform doping over large-area substrates. In addition, the materials that deposit on the wall of the chamber can contaminate later depositions. This "line of sight" technique also can create holes in the film due to shadowing, which causes an increase in the device series-resistance and short circuit.

=== Organic vapor phase deposition ===
Organic vapor phase deposition (OVPD), shown in Fig. 9(b), allows better control of the structure and morphology of the film than vacuum thermal evaporation. The process involves evaporation of the organic material over a substrate in the presence of an inert carrier gas. The resulting film morphology can be tuned by changing the gas flow rate and the source temperature. Uniform films can be grown by reducing the carrier gas pressure, which will increase the velocity and mean free path of the gas, and as a result boundary layer thickness decreases. Cells produced by OVPD do not have issues related with contaminations from the flakes coming out of the walls of the chamber, as the walls are warm and do not allow molecules to stick to and produce a film upon them.

Another advantage over VTE is the uniformity in evaporation rate. This occurs because the carrier gas becomes saturated with the vapors of the organic material coming out of the source and then moves towards the cooled substrate, Fig. 9(b). Depending on the growth parameters (temperature of the source, base pressure and flux of the carrier gas) the deposited film can be crystalline or amorphous in nature. Devices fabricated using OVPD show a higher short-circuit current density than that of devices made using VTE. An extra layer of donor-acceptor hetero-junction at the top of the cell may block excitons, whilst allowing conduction of electron; resulting in improved cell efficiency.

=== Solvent effects ===
Conditions for spin coating and evaporation affect device efficiency. Solvent and additives influence donor-acceptor morphology. Additives slow down evaporation, leading to more crystalline polymers and thus improved hole conductivities and efficiencies. Typical additives include 1,8-octanedithiol, ortho-dichlorobenzene, 1,8-diiodooctane (DIO), and nitrobenzene. The DIO effect was attributed to the selective solubilization of PCBM components, modifies fundamentally the average hopping distance of electrons, and thus improves electron mobility. Additives can also lead to big increases in efficiency for polymers. For HXS-1/PCBM solar cells, the effect was correlated with charge generation, transport and shelf-stability. Other polymers such as PTTBO also benefit significantly from DIO, achieving PCE values of more than 5% from around 3.7% without the additive.

Polymer Solar Cells fabricated from chloronaphthalene (CN) as a co-solvent enjoy a higher efficiency than those fabricated from the more conventional pure chlorobenzene solution. This is because the donor-acceptor morphology changes, which reduces the phase separation between donor polymer and fullerene. As a result, this translates into high hole mobilities. Without co-solvents, large domains of fullerene form, decreasing photovoltaic performance of the cell due to polymer aggregation in solution. This morphology originates from the liquid-liquid phase separation during drying; solve evaporation causes the mixture to enter into the spinodal region, in which there are significant thermal fluctuations. Large domains prevent electrons from being collected efficiently (decreasing PCE).

Small differences in polymer structure can also lead to significant changes in crystal packing that inevitably affect device morphology. PCPDTBT differs from PSBTBT caused by the difference in bridging atom between the two polymers (C vs. Si), which implies that better morphologies are achievable with PCPDTBT:PCBM solar cells containing additives as opposed to the Si system which achieves good morphologies without help from additional substances.

=== Self-assembled cells ===
Supramolecular chemistry was investigated, using donor and acceptor molecules that assemble upon spin casting and heating. Most supramolecular assemblies employ small molecules. Donor and acceptor domains in a tubular structure appear ideal for organic solar cells.

Diblock polymers containing fullerene yield stable organic solar cells upon thermal annealing. Solar cells with pre-designed morphologies resulted when appropriate supramolecular interactions are introduced.

Progress on BCPs containing polythiophene derivatives yield solar cells that assemble into well defined networks. This system exhibits a PCE of 2.04%. Hydrogen bonding guides the morphology.

Device efficiency based on co-polymer approaches have yet to cross the 2% barrier, whereas bulk-heterojunction devices exhibit efficiencies >7% in single junction configurations.

Fullerene-grafted rod-coil block copolymers have been used to study domain organization.

Supramolecular approaches to organic solar cells provide understanding about the macromolecular forces that drive domain separation.

== Transparent polymer cells ==
Transparent or semi-transparent PSCs allow for the absorption of low- or high-energy photons outside the visible spectrum, thus optimizing its sunlight harnessing capabilities and covering a broader absorption spectra. These types of PSCs are ideal for capturing near-infrared or ultraviolet photons due to its low inherent sensitivity to photons within the visible spectrum. Typical PSCs utilize opaque metal electrodes that limit its transparency, and thus its performance. The absorber layer of PSCs are intrinsically semi-transparent. Thus, one approach to achieving a visibly transparent PSC is to modify the top electrode to make it more transparent. Materials such as ITO, ultra-thin metals, metal grids, graphene, and carbon nanotubes have been used to fabricate semi-transparent top electrodes. Yet, the performance of transparent PSCs have shown to be lacking when compared to their opaque electrode PSC counterparts. When the top electrode is made transparent, the cell's ability to trap the electromagnetic field in the absorber layer decreases, resulting in a low PCE. An extensive amount of research is currently being conducted to improve the PCE of such cells. These types of PSCs have been applied to building-integrated photovoltaics, tandem devices, and portable electronics.

=== Infrared polymer cells ===
Infrared cells preferentially absorb light in the infrared range rather than visible wavelengths. A 2010 study developed infrared-transparent PSCs with a CNT film top electrode on the back side and an ITO glass layer on the front side allowing for optical transmittance from both sides of the cell. A ZnO layer was placed on top of the ITO with a P3HT:PCBM layer being added to the ZnO, thus creating an ITO/ZnO/P3HT:PCBM/CNT (bottom to top) cell. It was observed that the top CNT electrode and bottom ITO electrode both exhibited 80% transmittance within a 500 nm to 2.5 um spectra. The cell itself had an optical transmittance of 80% in the 670 nm to 1.2 um range, 60% in the 1.2 um to 2.5 um range. Conversely, a control cell with an Ag top electrode resulted in no transmittance within this spectra. Additionally, the cell had a relatively low transmittance in the visible region due to the high visible absorbance of the P3HT:PCBM layer. Such cells can be applied to tandem devices and the vertical assembly of PSCs.

As of 2012, infrared cells were nearly 70% transparent to visible light. The cells allegedly can be made in high volume at low cost using solution processing. The cells employ silver nanowire/titanium dioxide composite films as the top electrode, replacing conventional opaque metal electrodes. With this combination, 4% power-conversion efficiency was achieved.

In 2014, near-infrared polymer solar cells based on a copolymer of naphthodithiophene diimide and bithiophene (PNDTI-BT-DT) were fabricated in combination with PTB7 as an electron donor. Both PNDTI-BT-DT and PTB7 formed a crystalline structure in the blend films similar to in the pristine films, leading to the efficient charge generation contributed from both polymers.

Much research has been focused on developing a transparent top electrode for PSCs. However, a 2017 study explored optimizing the active layer of semi-transparent PSCs. The researchers proposed a semi-transparent PSC with enhanced efficiency that utilizes both narrow bandgap polymer donor, PTB7-Th, and non-fullerene acceptor, IHIC. The results of this study showed that the proposed PSC exhibited high transmittance and absorption in the infrared spectrum but low absorption in the visible spectrum. This cell showed to be relatively stable and have a maximum PCE of 9.77%, which, as of 2017, is the highest reported PCE value.

== Typical Current-Voltage Behavior and Power Conversion Efficiency ==
Organic photovoltaics, similar to inorganic photovoltaics, are generally characterized through current-voltage analysis. This analysis provides multiple device metrics values that are used to understand device performance. One of the most crucial metrics is the Power Conversion Efficiency (PCE).

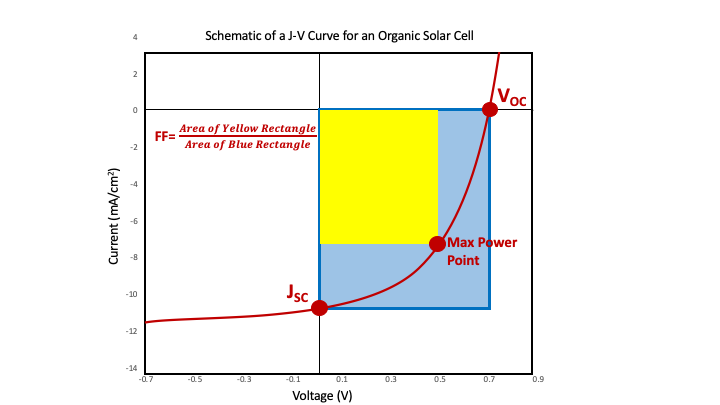

PCE (η) is proportional to the product of the short-circuit current (J_{SC}), the open-circuit voltage (V_{OC}), and the fill factor (FF), all of which can be determined from a current-voltage curve.

$\eta = \frac{V_\text{OC} \times J_\text{SC} \times FF}{P_\text{in}}$

Where P_{in} is the incident solar power.

The short circuit current (Jsc), is the maximum photocurrent generation value. It corresponds to the y-intercept value of standard current-voltage curve in which current is plotted along the y-axis and voltage is plotted along the x-axis. Within organic solar cells, the short circuit current can be impacted by a variety of material factors. These include the mobility of charge carriers, the optical absorption profile and general energetic driving forces that lead to a more efficient extraction of charge carriers

The open-circuit voltage (Voc) is the voltage when there is no current running through the device. This corresponds to the x-intercept on a current-voltage curve. Within bulk heterojunction organic photovoltaic devices, this value is highly dependent on HOMO and LUMO energy levels and work functions for the active layer materials

Since power is the product of voltage and current, the maximum power point occurs when the product between voltage and current is maximized.

The fill factor, FF, can be thought of as the "squareness" of a current voltage curve. It is the quotient of the maximum power value and the product of the open-circuit voltage and short circuit current. This is shown in the image above as the ratio of the area of the yellow rectangle to the greater blue rectangle. For organic photovoltaics, this fill factor is essentially a measure of how efficiently generated charges are extracted from the device. This can be thought of as a "competition" between charges transporting through the device, and charges that recombine.

A major issue surrounding polymer solar cells is the low Power Conversion Efficiency (PCE) of fabricated cells. In order to be considered commercially viable, PSCs must be able to achieve at least 10–15% efficiency—this is already much lower than inorganic PVs. However, due to the low cost of polymer solar cells, a 10–15% efficiency is commercially viable.

Recent advances in polymer solar cell performance have resulted from compressing the bandgap to enhance short-circuit current while lowering the Highest Occupied Molecular Orbital (HOMO) to increase open-circuit voltage. However, PSCs still suffer from low fill factors (typically below 70%). However, as of 2013, researchers have been able to fabricate PSCs with fill factors of over 75%. Scientists have been able to accomplish via an inverted BHJ and by using nonconventional donor / acceptor combinations.

== Commercialization ==
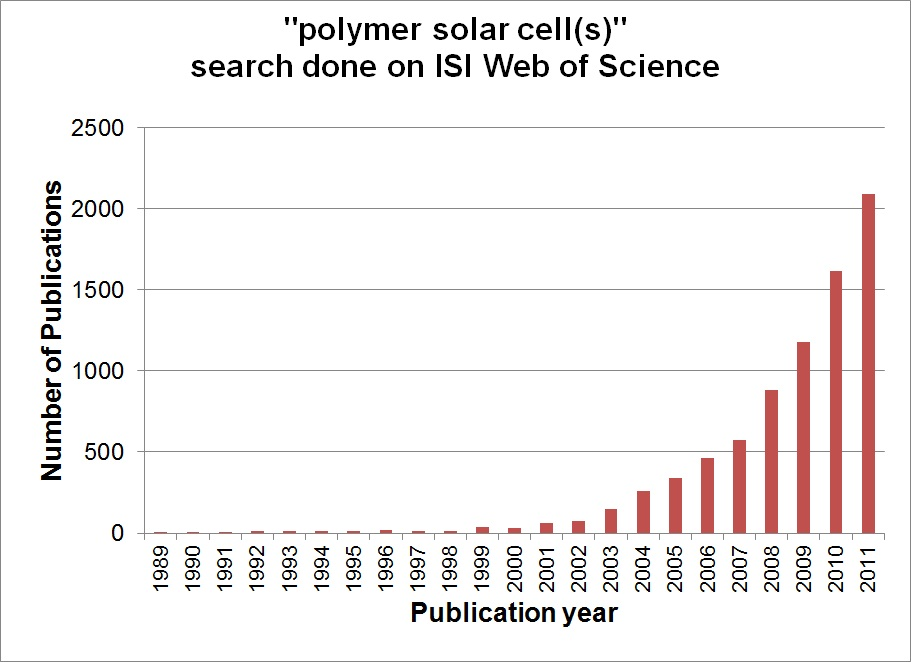
Number of scientific publications contributing to the subject "polymer solar cell(s)" by year. Search done through ISI, Web of Science.

Polymer solar cells have yet to commercially compete with silicon solar cells and other thin-film cells. The present efficiency of polymer solar cells lies near 10%, well below silicon cells. Polymer solar cells also suffer from environmental degradation, lacking effective protective coatings.

Further improvements in performance are needed to promote charge carrier diffusion; transport must be enhanced through control of order and morphology; and interface engineering must be applied to the problem of charge transfer across interfaces.

Research is being conducted into using tandem architecture in order to increase efficiency of polymer solar cells. Similar to inorganic tandem architecture, organic tandem architecture is expected to increase efficiency. Compared with a single-junction device using low-bandgap materials, the tandem structure can reduce heat loss during photon-to-electron conversion.

Polymer solar cells are not widely produced commercially. Starting in 2008, Konarka Technologies started production of polymer-fullerene solar cells. The initial modules were 3–5% efficient, and only last for a few years. Konarka has since filed for bankruptcy, as those polymer solar cells were unable to penetrate the PV market.

PSCs also still suffer from low fill factors (typically below 70%). However, as of 2013, researchers have been able to fabricate PSCs with fill factors of over 75%. Scientists have been able to accomplish via an inverted BHJ and by using nonconventional donor / acceptor combinations.

However, efforts are being made to upscale manufacturing of polymer solar cells, in order to decrease costs and also advocate for a practical approach for PSC production. Such efforts include full roll-to-roll solution processing. However, roll-to-roll solution processing is ill-suited for on-grid electricity production due to the short lifetime of polymer solar cells. Therefore, commercial applications for polymer solar cells still include primarily consumer electronics and home appliances.

== Modeling organic solar cells ==
As discussed above, organic semiconductors are highly disordered materials with no long range order. This means that the conduction band and valence band edges are not well defined. Furthermore, this physical and energetic disorder generates trap states in which photogenerated electrons and holes can become trapped and then eventually recombine.

Key to accurately describing organic solar cells in a device model is to include carrier trapping and recombination via trap states. A commonly used approach is to use an effective medium model, where by standard drift diffusion equations are used to describe transport across the device. Then, an exponential tail of trap states is introduced which decays into the band gap from the mobility edges. To describe capture/escape from these trap states the Shockley–Read–Hall (SRH) can be used. The Shockley-Read-Hall mechanism has been shown able to reproduce polymer:fullerene device behavior in both time domain and steady state.

Designing organic solar cells requires optimization of a large number of structural and compositional parameters, such as band gaps and layer thicknesses. Numerical device simulation can provide instrumental insight to identify the optimum stack configuration. This allows reducing the requested time for the development of efficient solar cells.

== Current challenges and recent progress ==
Difficulties associated with organic photovoltaic cells include their low external quantum efficiency (up to 70%) compared to inorganic photovoltaic devices, despite having good internal quantum efficiency; this is due to insufficient absorption with active layers on the order of 100 nanometers. Instabilities against oxidation and reduction, recrystallization and temperature variations can also lead to device degradation and decreased performance over time. This occurs to different extents for devices with different compositions, and is an area into which active research is taking place.

Other important factors include the exciton diffusion length, charge separation and charge collection which are affected by the presence of impurities.

=== Charge carrier mobility and transport ===
Especially for bulk heterojunction solar cells, understanding charge carrier transport is vital in improving the efficiencies of organic photovoltaics. Currently, bulk heterojunction devices have imbalanced charge-carrier mobility, with the hole mobility being at least an order of magnitude lower than that of the electron mobility; this results in space charge build-up and a decrease in the fill factor and power conversion efficiency of a device. Due to having low mobility, efficient bulk heterojunction photovoltaics have to be designed with thin active layers to avoid recombination of the charge carriers, which is detrimental to absorption and scalability in processing. Simulations have demonstrated that in order to have a bulk heterojunction solar cell with a fill factor above 0.8 and external quantum efficiency above 90%, there needs to be balanced charge carrier mobility to reduce a space charge effect, as well as an increase in charge carrier mobility and/or a decrease in the bimolecular recombination rate constant.

=== Effect of film morphology ===
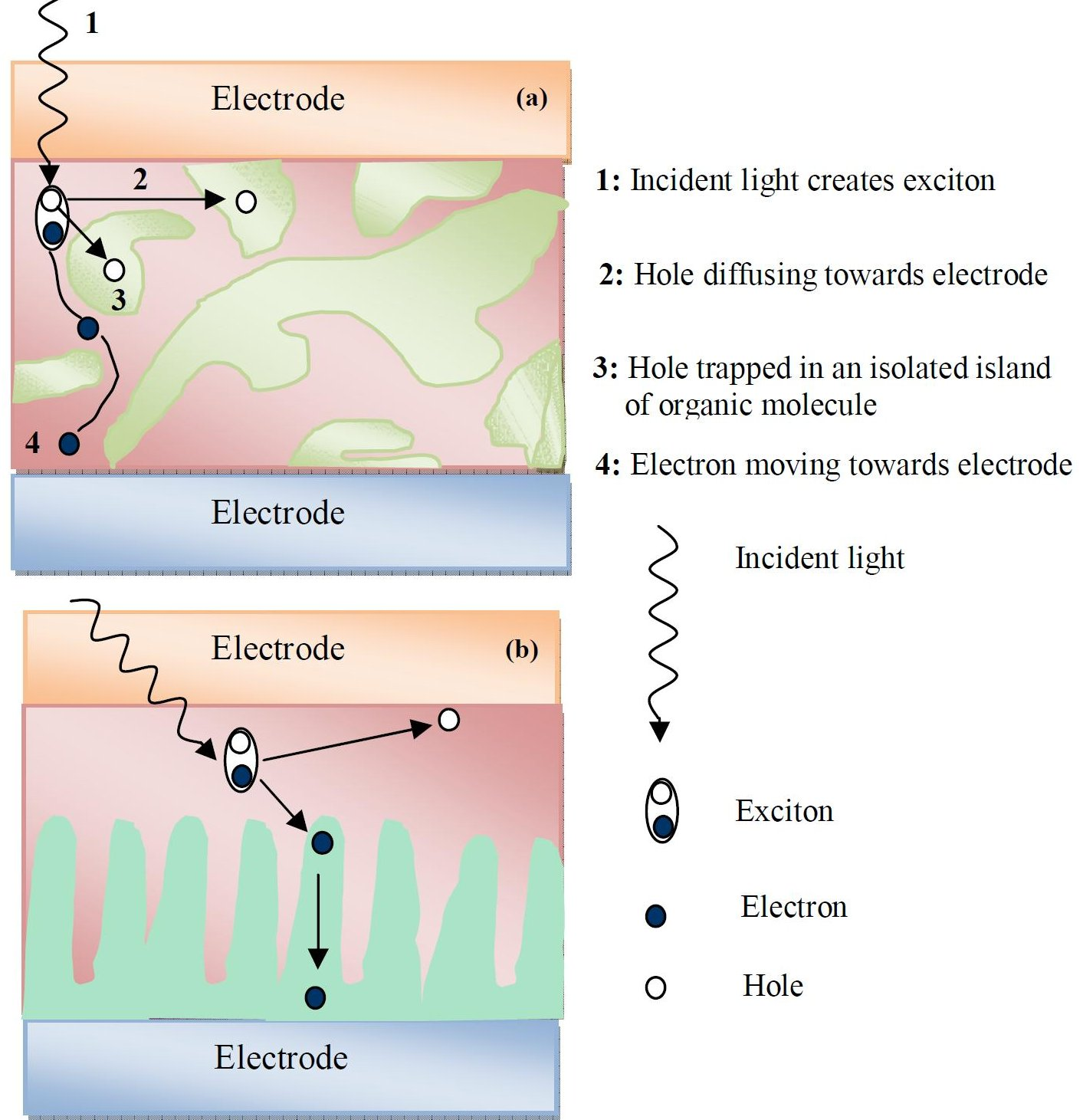
Fig. 8: Highly folded heterojunction (a); heterojunction with controlled growth (b)

As described above, dispersed heterojunctions of donor-acceptor organic materials have high quantum efficiencies compared to the planar hetero-junction, because in dispersed heterojunctions it is more likely for an exciton to find an interface within its diffusion length. Film morphology can also have a drastic effect on the quantum efficiency of the device. Rough surfaces and the presence of voids can increase the series resistance and also the chance of short-circuiting. Film morphology and, as a result, quantum efficiency can be improved by annealing of a device after covering it by a ~1000 Å thick metal cathode. Metal film on top of the organic film applies stresses on the organic film, which helps to prevent the morphological relaxation in the organic film. This gives more densely packed films and at the same time allows the formation of phase-separated interpenetrating donor-acceptor interface inside the bulk of organic thin film.

Building upon these advancements, the National Renewable Energy Laboratory (NREL) has been developing roll-to-roll processing techniques to refine morphological control in Bulk heterojunction layers. By precisely turning phase separation between donor-acceptor materials, these techniques facilitate more efficient charge extraction and transport, ultimately improving overall device performance. Additionally by optimizing deposit conditions and processes the solvent, NREL approach seeks to min morphological defects that contribute to charge recombination, thereby enhancing both efficiency and environmental sustainability in organic solar cells production.

=== Controlled growth heterojunction ===
Charge separation occurs at the donor-acceptor interface. Whilst traveling to the electrode, a charge can become trapped and/or recombine in a disordered interpenetrating organic material, resulting in decreased device efficiency. Controlled growth of the heterojunction provides better control over positions of the donor-acceptor materials, resulting in much greater power efficiency (ratio of output power to input power) than that of planar and highly disoriented hetero-junctions (as shown in Fig. 8). Thus, the choice of suitable processing parameters in order to better control the structure and film morphology is highly desirable.

=== Light trapping ===
Various type of components are applied to increase light trapping (Light in-coupling) effects in thin organic solar cells. In addition to the flexibility of organic solar cells, by using flexible electrodes and substrates instead of ITO and glass respectively, fully flexible organic solar cells can be produced. By these use of flexible substrates and substrates, easier methods to provide light trapping effects to OPVs are introduced such as polymer electrodes with embedded scattering particles, nano imprinted polymer electrodes, patterned PET substrates and even optical display film commercialized for liquid crystal displays (LCD) as substrates. Much research will be taken for enhancing the performance of OPVs with the merit of easy light trapping structures processing.

=== Use in tandem photovoltaics ===
Recent research and study has been done in utilizing an organic solar cell as the top cell in a hybrid tandem solar cell stack. Because organic solar cells have a higher band gap than traditional inorganic photovoltaics like silicon or CIGS, they can absorb higher energy photons without losing much of the energy due to thermalization, and thus operate at a higher voltage. The lower energy photons and higher energy photons that are unabsorbed pass through the top organic solar cell and are then absorbed by the bottom inorganic cell. Organic solar cells are also solution processible at low temperatures with a low cost of 10 dollars per square meter, resulting in a printable top cell that improves the overall efficiencies of existing, inorganic solar cell technologies. Much research has been done to enable the formation of such a hybrid tandem solar cell stack, including research in the deposition of semi-transparent electrodes that maintain low contact resistance while having high transparency.

=== Mechanical behavior ===
Understanding the mechanical properties of organic semiconductors and in particular, the wide range of failure mechanisms of operating organic solar cell devices are critical in determining the operational stability of organic solar cells for various applications.The mechanical properties of organic solar cells can be attributed to intermolecular and surface forces present in the material. These attributes are not only influenced by the molecular structure but are also quite sensitive to processing conditions, making the study of mechanical properties of polymer thin films such as tensile modulus, ductility and fracture toughness under strain rather difficult. Because of this, it is nontrivial to quantify a "figure of merit" that will predict the mechanical stability of a device and the robustness of a device under strain will depend on many factors.

Most often, the substrate provides support to the device and mechanical failure of the substrate will lead to suboptimal power conversion efficiency of the device. Hence while it is necessary that the substrate provides mechanical support to the organic active layer, care must be taken to ensure that increasing the tensile strength of the substrate does not come at the cost of the film fracturing at low strains. In general, it is desirable that the active layer deforms in tandem with the substrate. This is made possible with a low elastic modulus and high elastic limit. The ductility of a thin film is commonly measured as the strain at which cracks appear on the film. However, the crack onset strain is also dependent on other factors such as the degree of cohesion/adhesion between the film and the substrate. Various studies have related the cohesive or adhesive fracture energy G_{c} , defined as the work required to break separate polymer interfaces to molecular parameters and processing conditions. Along with the cohesion, the trajectory of crack propagation following formation depends on the mechanical properties of the material the crack propagates through. In polymers like P3HT that exhibit good plasticity, a plastic zone forms at the crack tip upon the application of a tensile strain normal to the plane of the device and expands until it is confined by either crystalline domains in the film or by a rigid substrate, thus dissipating the deformation energy and decreasing the cohesion between the interfaces. The mechanical buckling technique has also proven to be quite successful in determining the elastic moduli of various organic thin films. The method is based on the buckling instability that gives rise to wrinkles in the film under a compressive strain.The wavelength of the wrinkling pattern, can be related to the tensile modulus of the film in terms of the film thickness and elastic modulus of the substrate.

In the design of devices incorporating organic solar cells, Gc and strain at fracture have been identified as two metrics that are important to consider. The bulk heterojunction (BHJ) layer is usually the weakest layer of an organic solar cell, so it is necessary to design the BHJ materials to be mechanically stable, with a target G_{c} of 5 J m-2 and a target strain at fracture of 20-30%. Polymer-based acceptors have been shown to exhibit superior mechanical properties when compared to small-molecule acceptors and fullerene-based acceptors. Additionally, the mechanical properties of polymer-based acceptors are influenced by M_{n}, the number-average molecular weight of the polymer molecules. It was determined that mechanical properties increase with increasing M_{n}, but only once Mn has surpassed M_{c}, the critical molecular weight at which entanglements cause the rate of viscosity change to increase with increasing M_{n}. This phenomenon occurs because the rate of chain entanglement and miscibility between the polymer acceptor and donor both increase. The effect of these characteristics is that the plastic deformation of these materials in reaction to mechanical stress was high, meaning that more of the energy was dissipated, while the materials with less mechanical strength fractured more readily.

=== Recent directions for bulk heterojunction materials research ===
One major area of current research is the use of non-fullerene acceptors. While fullerene acceptors have been the standard for most organic photovoltaics due to their compatibility within bulk heterojunction cell designs as well as their good transport properties, they do have some fallbacks that are leading researchers to attempt to find alternatives. Some negatives of fullerene acceptors include their instability, that they are somewhat limited in energy-tunability and they have poor optical absorption. Researchers have developed small molecule acceptors that due to their good energy tunability, can exhibit high open-circuit voltages. Combining a polymer donor (D18) with a small molecule acceptor (Y6), scientists have fabricated organic solar cells in the laboratory giving high efficiencies over 18%. However, there are still major challenges with non-fullerene acceptors, including the low charge carrier mobilities of small molecule acceptors, and that the sheer number of possible molecules is overwhelming for the research community.

A challenge facing the development of organic solar cells utilizing non-fullerene acceptors (NFAs) is the selection of a solvent that has a high boiling point and is environmentally friendly, whereas conventional solvents such as chloroform (CF) tend to exhibit low boiling points and toxicity. Such a solvent is required for further scale-up of organic solar cells, but has also been associated with decreases in PCE due to poor solubility of donor and acceptor materials within the solvent. Appending alkyl chains to NFAs has led to increases in solubility but decreases in molecular packing (π-stacking), which leads to no net impact on PCE. The use of guest assistance has been found to benefit both solubility and molecular packing. A guest molecule named BTO with oligo(ethylene glycol) (OEG) side chains used in conjunction with the NFA Y6 as the acceptor, PM6 as the donor, and paraxylene (PX) as the high-melting-point and sustainable solvent led to an increase in PCE from 11% to over 16%, regarded an acceptable level of efficiency. A further modification that has been successful in the development of cleaner organic photovoltaics is the hot-spin coating of substrates by non-halogenated solvents. It was found that the temperature at which hot-spin coating was operated altered the solution to solid phase evolution of the acceptor-donor blends so that higher temperatures resulted in a higher acceptor concentration in the surface of the substrate. This is because higher temperatures facilitated decreased aggregation and precipitation, allowing the substrate to retain a higher acceptor concentration. In an experiment, organic solar cells constructed with ternary blends of PM6 donor and Y6-1O and BO-4Cl acceptors and various non-halogenated solvents including o-xylene and toluene exhibited PCE values of over 18%, which are the most efficient organic photovoltaics constructed with non-halogenated solvents, to date. Further morphological analyses showed that the hot-spun OPVs prepared with non-halogenated solvents exhibited similar morphological characteristics to that of OPVs prepared with halogenated solvents.

Small molecules are also being heavily researched to act as donor materials, potentially replacing polymeric donors. Since small molecules do not vary in molecular weights the way polymers do, they would require less purification steps and are less susceptible to macromolecule defects and kinks that can create trap states leading to recombination. Recent research has shown that high-performing small molecular donor structures tend to have planar 2-D structures and can aggregate or self assemble. Sine performance of these devices is highly depended on active layer morphology, present research is continuing to investigate small molecule possibilities, and optimize device morphology through processes such as annealing for various materials.

In parallel, advancements in bulk heterojunction materials continue to derive improvements in efficiency and stability. The U.S. Department of Energy (DOE) has supported research into novel-non fullerene acceptors (NFAs) aimed at minimizing energy losses and improving charge separation.

== See also ==
- Bioplastic
- Conductive ink
- Dye-sensitized solar cell
- Energy harvesting
- Grid parity
- Hybrid solar cell
- Inkjet solar cell
- Nanocrystal solar cell
- Photoelectrochemical cell
- Printed electronics
- Roll-to-roll

Other third-generation solar cells:

- Dye-sensitized solar cell
- Hybrid solar cell
- Nanocrystal solar cell
- Photoelectrochemical cell
