= Financial incentives for photovoltaics =

Incentives offered to electricity consumers

Financial incentives for photovoltaics are incentives offered to electricity consumers to install and operate solar-electric generating systems, also known as photovoltaics (PV).

Governments offered incentives in order to encourage the PV industry to achieve the economies of scale needed to compete where the cost of PV-generated electricity is above the cost from the existing grid. Such policies were implemented to promote national or territorial energy independence, high tech job creation and reduction of carbon dioxide emissions which cause climate change. When, in a given country or territory, the cost of solar electricity falls to meet the rising cost of grid electricity, then 'grid parity' is reached, and in principle incentives are no longer needed. In some places, the price of electricity varies as a function of time and day (due to demand variations). In places where high demand (and high electricity prices) coincide with high sunshine (usually hot places with air conditioning) then grid parity is reached before the cost of solar electricity meets the average price of grid electricity. As of 2022, in many jurisdictions, incentives have been significantly replaced by auctions as the cost of electricity produced by PV has indeed fallen below the price of electricity bought from the grid.

== Mechanisms ==
Incentive mechanisms are used (often in combination), such as:

- Investment subsidies: the authorities refund part of the cost of installation of the system.
- Feed-in Tariffs/net metering: the electricity utility buys PV electricity from the producer under a multiyear contract at a guaranteed rate.
- Solar Renewable Energy Certificates (SRECs)

Investment subsidies

With investment subsidies, the financial burden falls upon the taxpayer, while with feed-in tariffs the extra cost is distributed across the utilities' customer bases. While the investment subsidy may be simpler to administer, the main argument in favour of feed-in tariffs is the encouragement of quality. Investment subsidies are paid out as a function of the nameplate capacity of the installed system and are independent of its actual power yield over time, so reward overstatement of power, and tolerate poor durability and maintenance.

Feed-in Tariffs (FiT)

With feed-in tariffs, the initial financial burden falls upon the consumer. Feed-in tariffs reward the number of kilowatt-hours produced over a long period of time, but because the rate is set by the authorities may result in overpayment of the owner of the PV installation. The price paid per kWh under a feed-in tariff exceeds the price of grid electricity.

Net metering

"Net metering" refers to the case where the price paid by the utility is the same as the price charged, often achieved by having the electricity meter spin backwards as electricity produced by the PV installation in excess of the amount being used by the owner of the installation is fed back into the grid.

Solar Renewable Energy Credits (SRECs)

Alternatively, SRECs allow for a market mechanism to set the price of the solar generated electricity subsidy. In this mechanism, a renewable energy production or consumption target is set, and the utility (more technically the load serving entity) is obliged to purchase renewable energy or face a fine (Alternative Compliance Payment or ACP). The producer is credited for an SREC for every 1,000 kWh of electricity produced. If the utility buys this SREC and retires it, they avoid paying the ACP. In principle this system delivers the cheapest renewable energy, since the all solar facilities are eligible and can be installed in the most economic locations. Uncertainties about the future value of SRECs has led to SREC contract markets long-term to give clarity to their prices and allow solar developers to pre-sell/hedge their SRECs.

Smart meters allow the retail price to vary as a function of time ("time of use pricing"). When demand is high the retail price is high and vice versa. With time-of-use pricing, when peak demand coincides with hot sunny days, the cost of solar electricity is closer to the price of grid electricity, and grid parity will be reached earlier than if one single price were used for grid electricity.

The Japanese government through its Ministry of International Trade and Industry ran a successful programme of subsidies from 1994 to 2003. By the end of 2004, Japan led the world in installed PV capacity with over 1.1 GW.

In 2004, the German government introduced the first large-scale feed-in tariff system, under a law known as the 'EEG' (see below) which resulted in explosive growth of PV installations in Germany. At the outset the Feed-in Tariff (FIT) was over 3x the retail price or 8x the industrial price. The principle behind the German system is a 20-year flat rate contract. The value of new contracts is programmed to decrease each year, in order to encourage the industry to pass on lower costs to the end users.

In 2006 California approved the 'California Solar Initiative', offering a choice of investment subsidies or FIT for small and medium systems and a FIT for large systems. The small-system FIT of $0.39 per kWh (far less than EU countries) expires in just 5 years, and the residential investment incentive is overwhelmed by a newly required time-of-use tariff, with a net cost increase to new systems. All California incentives are scheduled to decrease in the future depending as a function of the amount of PV capacity installed.

At the end of 2006, the Ontario Power Authority (Canada) began its Standard Offer Program, the first in North America for small renewable projects (10MW or less). This guarantees a fixed price of $0.42 CDN per kWh for PV and $0.11 CDN per kWh for other sources (i.e., wind, biomass, hydro) over a period of twenty years. Unlike net metering, all the electricity produced is sold to the OPA at the SOP rate. The generator then purchases any needed electricity at the current prevailing rate (e.g., $0.055 per kWh). The difference should cover all the costs of installation and operation over the life of the contract.

The price per Kilowatt hour (kWh) or kW_{p} of the FIT or investment subsidies is only one of three factors that stimulate the installation of PV. The other two factors are insolation (the more sunshine, the less capital is needed for a given power output) and administrative ease of obtaining permits and contracts (Southern European countries are reputedly complex). For example, Greece, at the end of 2008, had 3GWp of permit requests unprocessed and halted new applications.

== National incentives ==
=== Armenia ===
Armenia is a country with enormous solar energy potential. Energy flow per square meter is about 1,720 kWh compared to the European average of 1,000 kWh. Accordingly, the Armenian government is providing various incentives to promote solar energy self-consumption practices. For example, residential consumers are exempt from regulations if they have an installed capacity of up to 150 kWh. Per amendments made in 2017, the limit for commercial consumers has been increased, and in the case of commercial consumers, capacities of up to 500 kWh are exempt from regulations. Additionally, solar panels, batteries, EV chargers, and e-vehicles are exempt from import taxes.

For 2018, the established Feed-in tariffs excluding VAT from solar plants was 42,845 AMD/kWh.

Armenia also provides guarantees for renewable energy consumption, and more precisely, it guarantees that all energy produced from solar plants will be purchased within 20 years.

=== Australia ===
==== Small-scale Renewable Energy Scheme (SRES) ====
The SRES is a federal scheme and is designed to reduce greenhouse gas emissions and encourage the uptake of renewable energy technologies. Under the scheme, eligible systems can earn small-scale technology certificates (STCs) based on how much electricity they generate or displace. Each megawatt hour of renewable energy generated by the system is awarded one STC.

==== Large-scale Renewable Energy Target (LRET) ====
The LRET is a federal scheme that encourages investment in the development of renewable energy power stations, like wind and solar farms, by providing a financial incentive for electricity generated from renewable sources creating a market for creating and selling large-scale generation certificates (LGC).

==== State based schemes ====
Aside from the federal schemes each state of Australia also has its own rebates subsidies and incentives. These are usually more short lived and vary in nature.

==== Feed-in tariffs ====
Australia is a federation of states and territories. Each state has different laws regarding feed-in tariffs. The states have a range of policies from no feed-in tariffs to feed-in tariffs at more than double the normal consumer price of electricity. Some states are considering feed-in tariffs but have not yet enacted relevant legislation, or the legislation has not yet come into effect. Only a small proportion are Gross Feed-in tariffs (proposed NSW and ACT), most are on a net basis. In the Northern Territory at present only the Alice Springs Solar City is eligible for feed-in tariffs for solar PV.

=== Bulgaria ===
==== Situation as of April 1, 2010 ====
- <=5 kW_{p} 792.89 Leva/MWh (about €0.405/kWh)
- >5 kW_{p} 728.29 Leva/MWh (about €0.372/kWh)

Bulgarian regulator DKER

Remuneration for 25-year contract, with possible next year changes set related to 2 components (electricity sales price previous year, RES component).

=== Canada ===
Overview of Federal and provincial incentives at Canadian Solar Industry Association (CanSIA).

==== Ontario ====
In 2006 the Ontario Power Authority introduced the Renewable Energy Standard Offer Program. This program was replaced with the 2009 Feed-In Tariff program for renewable energy (FIT). The FIT program is further divided into the MicroFIT program for projects less than 10 kW, designed to encourage individuals and households to generate renewable energy.

The program was launched in September 2009 and the tariffs were fixed then. The solar projects ≤10 kW received $0.802, however, as of 13 August 2010 ground mounted systems will receive a lower tariff than rooftop mounted systems.

Feed-In tariff rates for the Ontario Power Authority (OPA) FIT and MicroFIT Programs, for renewable generation capacity of 10MW or less, connected at 50 kV:

Solar Photovoltaic
Site	Power (kW)	Rate ($CDN per kWh)
Ground Mounted	Up to 10	$0.642
Ground Mounted	Over 10	$0.443
Rooftop	Up to 10	$0.802
Rooftop	Over 10 and under 250	$0.713
Rooftop	Over 250 and under 500	$0.635
Rooftop	Over 500	$0.539

- Wind, Hydro, Biomass: from $0.111 up to $0.195/kWh CDN

Tariffs vary based on fuel type and size of installation. The contract duration with the OPA is 20 years, with a constant remuneration for solar, though biomass, biogas, hydro, and wind receive a 20% of Consumer Price Index price adder. Additionally, biomass, biogas, hydro receive a 35% peak demand adder during peak demand periods of the day and -10% off peak. Finally, all but solar may also qualify for a community and aboriginal price adder. All power produced is sold to the OPA. Generator then purchases back what is needed at prevailing rate (e.g., $0.055/kWh CDN). The intent of the Feed-In Tariff program is to provide an 11% return on investment.

In June 2013, Ontario Canceled Feed-in Tariffs for Large Projects.

=== Croatia ===
As of March 2007

- Systems <10 kW_{p}: 3.40 HRK (€0.45 /kWh)
- Systems from 10 KW_{p} up to 30 kW_{p}: 3.00 HRK (€0.40 /kWh)
- Systems >30 kW_{p}: 2.10 HRK (€0.28 /kWh)

Contract duration 12 years

Price calculated in Croatian Kuna, exchange rate used for conversion of above rates 1 EUR = 7.48 HRK.

=== Czech Republic ===
As of 2010 feed-in tariffs are 12.25 CZK/kWh for <=30 kW_{p} and 12.15 for >30 kW_{p}. Contract duration is 20 years with yearly increase linked to inflation (within range 2–4%). New contract prices are changed for 5% yearly, due to unexpected rise of number of installations in 2009 new bill is proposed allowing 25% change.

=== China ===
As of August 2011 a national feed-in tariff for solar projects was issued, and is about US$0.15 per kWh.

==== Situation as of 2009 ====
Backed by the Chinese government's total stimulus package of RMB 4 trillion ($585bn), Chinese businesses are now among the top producers of electric vehicles, wind turbines, solar panels and energy efficient appliances, according to a report released last month by London-based The Climate Group. In March 2009, the China government introduced the "Solar Roofs Plan" for promoting the application of solar PV building. The Ministry of Finance in July re-introduced the "Golden Sun Project" with more specific details of the related policy. The policy provides that the grid-connected photovoltaic power generation project, the state will in principle by photovoltaic power generation system and its supporting transmission and distribution projects to give 50% of the total investment subsidies. The subsidy will rise to 70% for solar power systems in remote areas that are not currently connected to the grid. Projects with a minimum capacity of 500MW would be eligible for the related incentive. All such financial incentive schemes boosts most of the new development in China solar market, such as the new thin film solar plant of Anwell Technologies and Tianwei, as well as the contract signed by LDK solar to install up to 500 MW of capacity of PV stations over the next five years in Jiangsu Province of China.

However, there still is no clarity on Feed-in-Tariffs for domestic installations within China.

=== France ===
The situation between 2011 and 2017, was detailed in 2011 Feed in Tariff Arrêté.

In 2022 there were two feed in tariffs, one for self-consumption (where only the power exported to the grid is remunerated) and one for total sale (in which all production is remunerated at the feed-in tariff). For the period 1 August 2022 - 31 October 2022 the FiT rates in France were:

Feed-in tariffs (€/kWh)
System size (kW_{p})	Excess from self-consumption	Total Sale
<3	0.10	0.2022
3-9	0.10	0.1718
9-36	0.06	0.1231
36-100	0.06	0.1070

=== Germany ===
The Renewable Energy Sources Act (German: Erneuerbare-Energien-Gesetz or EEG) came into effect in 2000 and has been adapted by many countries around the world. It was amended several times and triggered an unprecedented boom in solar electricity production. This success is largely due to the creation of favourable political framework conditions.

Grid operators are legally obliged to pay producers of solar electricity a fixed remuneration (feed-in tariff or FIT) for solar generated electricity fed into the grid, depending on the size and type of the system, as well as the year of installation. The tariffs vary to account for the different costs of rooftop or ground-mounted systems in accordance with the size of the system and system cost reductions over time. Since the EEG guarantees the FIT payments for a duration of 20 years, it provides sustained planning security for investors in PV systems. Grid parity for large installation and small roof-top systems was already reached in 2011 and 2012, respectively.

As of July 2014, feed-in tariffs for photovoltaic systems range from 12.88 ¢/kWh for small roof-top system to 8.92 ¢/kWh for large utility scaled solar parks. Feed-in tariffs are restricted to a maximum system capacity of 10 MW. The feed-in tariff for solar PV is declining at a faster rate than for any other renewable technology.

Evidence from Germany suggests that financial incentives can interact with social diffusion: municipalities with existing PV systems saw more subsequent installations, consistent with neighborhood effects in rooftop PV adoption.

On 1 August 2014, a revised Renewable Energy Sources Act entered into force. Specific deployment corridors now stipulate the extent to which renewable energy is to be expanded in the future and the funding rates (feed-in tariffs) will no longer be fixed by the government, but will be determined by auction.

=== Greece ===
Situation as of 2009. New PV FIT law introduced 15 January 2009.

Feed-in tariffs (€/kWh)
System size (kW_{p})	Mainland	Island
≤ 100 kW_{p}	0.45	0.50
>100 kW_{p}	0.40	0.45

Contract duration 20 years, indexed to 25% of annual inflation. New contract prices to reduce 1% per month starting 2010.

Special program with higher FIT but no tax rebates planned to drive 750 MW_{p} installations of BIPV.

Investment subsidies: Tax rebates and grants (40%) are available.

=== India ===
The Indian Renewable Energy Development Agency (IREDA) provides revolving fund to financing and leasing companies offering affordable credit for the purchase of PV systems in India.

State utilities are mandated to buy green energy via a Power Purchase Agreement from solar farms

80% accelerated depreciation Concessional duties on import of raw materials Excise duty exemption on certain devices

=== Ireland ===
Until 15 February 2022, residential and micro scale solar received no grant aid, no subsidy and no tax deductions. No Feed-In tariffs were available for these customers and net-metering was similarly unavailable. Co-operative and privately shared electricity between separate properties was illegal. A 9c/kWh Feed-In tariff was available from Electric Ireland until December 2014, when it was withdrawn without replacement. Income from this feed-in tariff was subject to income tax at up to 58%. No other Micro-scale Feed-In tariffs were available. Additionally, homeowners with grid connected PV systems were charged a €9.45 per billing cycle "low-usage surcharge" for importing less than 2kWh per day or being a net exporter of energy in a billing period.

From 15 February 2022 the "Clean Export Guarantee (CEG) Tariff" was introduced as a part of the government's Micro-generation Support Scheme (MSS). In 2023 tariffs offered by major electricity retailers in response to the CEG ranged from 18c to 24c per kWh, typically along with a fixed daily charge for grid connectivity.

=== Italy ===
The Ministry for Industry issued a decree on 5 August 2005 that provides the legal framework for the system known as "Conto Energia". The following incentive tariffs are from the decree of 19 Feb 2007.

Feed-in tariffs in Euros per kWh
System size in kW_{p}	Free-standing	Semi-integrated	Integrated
1 to 3	0.40	0.44	0.49
3 to 20	0.38	0.42	0.46
20 or more	0.36	0.40	0.44

Contract duration 20 years, constant remuneration.

On March 8, 2011, a government decree has cancelled this regime: new installations from June 1, 2011, will receive lower tariffs. The exact amounts will be decided during the month of April 2011.

=== Japan ===
The former incentive programme run by the Ministry of Economy, Trade and Industry was stopped in 2005.

=== New Zealand ===
Installations connected to the grid to sell back power must comply with Part 6 of the Electricity Industry Participation Code 2010. In 2023 typical feed-in tariffs available from the main retail electricity suppliers ranged from 7c to 17c per kWh (excluding GST) with many companies limiting connection to a maximum of 10 kW of generating capacity.

=== Republic of Macedonia ===
As of October 2009

- Systems <50 kW_{p}: €0.46/kWh
- Systems >50 kW_{p}: €0.41/kWh

As of July 2010

- Systems <50 kW_{p}: €0.30 /kWh
- Systems 51 to 1000 kW_{p}: €0.26 /kWh

As of 2013

- Systems <50 kW_{p}: €0.16 /kWh
- Systems 51 to 1000 kW_{p}: €0.12 /kWh

Contract duration 20 years

=== Serbia ===
As of January 2010

- All Systems: €0.23/kWh

As of January 2012

- Building integrated, up to 3 kW: €0.2066/kWh
- Building integrated, 3 kW to 500 kW: formula 20,941 – 9,383*R, where R is power
- Ground mounted, >500 kW: €0.1625/kWh

Contract duration 12 years

=== Slovakia ===
As of December 2010

- Systems <100 kW_{p}: €0.43/kWh
- Systems >100 kW_{p}: €0.425/kWh

Contract duration 15 years

2016: Only rooftop and below 30 kW. €0,088/kW (€88,91 /MWH). But all three DSO has "Stop stav" – they refuse connection.

There is only connection of PV without subsidy.

=== South Korea ===
Situation as of Oct 11 2006.

Feed–in Tariffs:

- Systems >30 kW_{p}: KRW677.38/kWh
- Systems <30 kW_{p}: KRW711.25/kWh (ca $0.75, €0.60)

Additional subsidies available.

Contract duration 15 years, constant remuneration

=== Spain ===
Situation as of 2009

No change since September 2008: the legal framework is the Real Decreto (royal decree) 1578/2008 replacing 436/2004 modified by Real Decreto 1634/2006.

Feed-in Tariff:

Building mounted

- <= 20 kW_{p}: €0.34 /kWh
- > 20 kW_{p}: €0.32 /kWh

Ground mounted

- 0.32 EUR/kWh

These feed in tariffs are capped at approximately 500 MW_{p}/y, of which 241 MW ground mounted, 233 MW_{p} building mounted >20 MW_{p}, 26.7 MW <20 MW_{p} building mounted.

=== Taiwan ===
Situation as of 2009

The Bureau of Energy under Taiwan's Ministry of Economic Affairs (MOEA) has announced the proposed feed-in tariff rates for photovoltaic (PV) and other types of renewable energy in September. A tentative rates of NT$8.1243–9.3279 (US$0.250–0.287) per kilowatt-hour (kWh) has been set for PV generated power, however, the proposed rates have fallen considerably short of local solar players' expectations. Public hearing will be held on 24 Sept to collect opinions from all parties concerned.

=== United Kingdom ===
==== Feed-in tariffs ====
As of November 2010, the UK Government introduced a feed-in tariff for small scale (up to 5MW) renewables from 1 April 2010, with a review in 2012 for changes on 1 April 2013. Though limits on max MW_{p} installations were to be announced in December to steer away from large solar utilities.

- From April 2010, the FiT will offer a fixed payment per kilowatt hour generated (see table) and a guaranteed minimum payment of 3p per kWh exported to the market (assumed 50% only) or the producer was entitled to opt out with your own Power Purchase Agreement (PPA). Tariffs were not index-linked to the RPI.
- Projects up to 5 MW were eligible, including off-grid installations.
- Technologies that will be eligible for the FiT from April 2010 were: wind, solar PV, hydro, anaerobic digestion, biomass, biomass CHP and non-renewable microchip (see table for tariffs).
- The FiT was offered for a 20-year period, with the exception of solar PV projects for which the period will be 25 years.
- The FiT designed with the aim of delivering 2% of the UK's energy from small scale projects by 2020.
- Where appropriate, support will decrease in line with expected technology cost reductions.
- Support levels were to be reviewed periodically and in response to sudden changes in technology costs. However, tariff levels were to be grandfathered, so that projects continue to receive the levels of support offered at their registration.
- Projects below 50 kW_{p} had to be installed by MCS accredited installers. 50 kW_{p} to 5 MW_{p} projects will be subject to accreditation similar to the current RO process.
- Projects installed in the interim period between the announcement of the FIT (15 July 2009) and the start of the scheme (April 2010) were eligible to receive the tariff with some conditions on the support period. However, any non-domestic projects that receive grant funding from central government had to return the grant before they could receive FiT payments.
- Regardless of technology, projects installed prior to 15 July 2009 were eligible to receive generation payments then being auctioned of 9p/kWh and export payments of 5p/kWh, provided they were previously receiving support under the RO scheme.
- Projects up to 50 kW_{p} in size were no longer be able to claim the RO; existing installations were automatically transferred to the FiT. New and interim period projects between 50 kW and 5 MW will be given a one-off choice between claiming support under the FIT or the RO. Existing projects between 50 kW and 5 MW in size remained under the RO, with no opportunity to transfer to the FIT.
- No further capital/financial support for the up-front capital costs of projects. (though Green Deal for dwellings was under consultation as a no up front cost incentive for energy efficiency and renewables)
- Feed-in-tariff rates for PV grid connected

43.3 p/kWh < 4 kW > 37.9 p/kWh < 10 kW > 32.8 p/kWh < 100 kW > 30.7 p/kWh

i.e. 43.3 pence/kWh fed in from a less than (or equals?) 4 kW peak power installation

37.9 p/kWh for >(or=?) 4 kW <(or=?) 10 kW

32.8 p/kWh for >(or=?) 10 kW <(or=?) 100 kW

30.7 p/kWh for >(or=?) 100 kW

Stand alone installation: 30.7 p/kWh

From 1 August 2011, the tariff rate for > 50 KW_{p} was 19.0 p/kWh.

Typical domestic (< 4 kW peak?) installations registered (on or?) after December 12, 2011, only attracted (~)21 p/kWh.

==== 2013: Contracts for difference ====
To support new low carbon electricity generation in the United Kingdom, both nuclear and renewable, contracts for difference were introduced by the Energy Act 2013, progressively replacing the previous Renewables Obligation (RO) scheme. A House of Commons Library report explained the scheme as:

Contracts for Difference (CfD) are a system of reverse auctions intended to give investors the confidence and certainty they need to invest in low carbon electricity generation.

CfDs work by fixing the prices received by low carbon generation, reducing the risks they face, and ensuring that eligible technology receives a price for generated power that supports investment. CfDs also reduce costs by fixing the price consumers pay for low carbon electricity. This requires generators to pay money back when wholesale electricity prices are higher than the strike price, and provides financial support when the wholesale electricity prices are lower.

The costs of the CfD scheme are funded by a statutory levy on all UK-based licensed electricity suppliers (known as the ‘Supplier Obligation’), which is passed on to consumers.

=== United States ===
==== Federal ====
Federal tax Grant of 30%, which expires December 31, 2011, or a Federal tax credit of 30%, which expires December 31, 2016 are available for residential systems and businesses. Details of this and state incentives are summarized at DSIRE. Legislation currently under consideration in Congress: "Renewable Energy and Job Creation Act of 2008" This multifaceted energy bill would extend investment tax credit. By June 2008, it had passed the House but had not overcome opposition from Senate Republicans who had filibustered it over tax provisions that would finance the program. In September 2008, it passed in the Senate with amendments.

==== California ====
Starting January 1, 2007

Administrative basis: California Public Utilities Commission (PUC) decision of August 24, 2006

Feed-in Tariffs and Investment subsidies :

- Systems >100 kW_{p}: $0.39/kWh
- Systems <100 kW_{p} can choose either $2.50/Wp or $0.39/kWh

Contract duration 5 years, constant remuneration

Net metering

- Up to 2.5% of peak demand, rolls over month to month, granted to utility at end of 12 month billing cycle

Approved equipment

- Since 1 July 2009, the CEC list of approved solar panels has been tightened to the SP1 / NSHP list to provide more protection to the end-users.

==== Colorado ====
Colorado became the first U.S. state to create a Renewable Portfolio Standard (RPS) under Amendment 37 in November 2004. amended in March 2007

Investor-owned utilities serving 40,000 or more customers to generate or purchase 10% of their retail electric sales from renewable-energy resources as well as a rebate program for customers

Utilities must provide increasing proportions of renewable or recycled energy in their electricity sales in Colorado: 3% in 2007; 5% in 2008–2010; 10% in 2011–2014; 15% in 2015–2019; and 20% in 2020 and thereafter. At least 4% of the standard must be generated by solar-electric technologies, half of which must be generated at the customer. Cooperatives and municipal utilities must follow a lower scale culminating in 10% in 2020. The 2007 amendments directed the Colorado Public Utility Commission (PUC) to revise or clarify its existing RPS rules on or before October 1, 2007. The PUC's rules generally apply to investor-owned utilities.

According to Green Power Network in 2006, U.S. tradable renewable energy credits (RECs) traded between ¢0.5 and 9.0/kWh. Many were at ¢2/kWh ($5–90/MWh)

Net metering::

- Credited to customer's next bill; utility pays customer at end of calendar year for excess kWh credits at the average hourly incremental cost for that year, limit on system size 2 MW, no enrollment limit

==== Utility rebate programs ====
Many states have counties and utilities which offer rebates of from $500 to $4/watt installed, as well as feed-in tariffs of up to $1.50/kWh. See reference for list. 40 states have net metering. See reference.

== See also ==
- Category:Renewable energy by country
- Cost of electricity by source
- Feed-in tariff
- Green energy
- Photovoltaics
- Renewable energy
- Renewable energy commercialization
