= William C. Tauber =

William C. Tauber is an Oregon Licensed Realtor with KNIPE REALTY ERA POWERED, Portland, Oregon. The So. California newspaper Orange County Register called Tauber a “Serial Entrepreneur because he always looks for the newest and fastest growing markets in the U.S.” and was also a finalist for the 2008 and 2009 Ernst & Young's Entrepreneur of the Year Awards.

Tauber has been involved in the energy conservation industry since 1999. Tauber founded Progressive Lighting & Energy Solutions in 2004. As of 2008, the company has made over 200 California corporations energy efficient. Tauber planned and led the strategic direction of the company, drawing upon his expertise with lighting reduction projects and photovoltaic (solar) energy. In 2009, he hosted The Green Energy Show with Bill Tauber, a weekly radio talk show on KRLA-870AM Los Angeles.

After selling Progressive Lighting & Energy Solutions, Bill Tauber co-founded and was a partner in Leads National Corp. (LNC), a B2B company that uses technology to generate real time, high quality prospects, directly to a phone or CRM system for small business financial lending.

Bill Tauber is also a member of the Freemasonry Fraternal Society. Being a U.S. Marine Corps veteran, he was on the Military Committee of the U.S. Marine Corps Scholarship Foundation, with his seventh and final year with the foundation as chairman of the Military Committee West Coast. He feels his greatest accomplishment was his eight(8) years in the Marine Corps and his achievements supporting the children of fallen Marines and Navy Corps children with the Scholarship Foundation.

Ecology Communications is a non profit organization that was founded by Bill Tauber in 2009 for the everyday family that wants to make an environmental change and save money but can't radically change their lifestyle.

== Early career ==
After the U.S. Marine Corps, Tauber entered the hotel and travel industry which ultimately led to purchasing and operating his hotel in Kihei, Maui, Hawaii. In the 1980s, cable television was on the immediate horizon. With roles in executive marketing, he moved on to become President of the Silent Network for the deaf and hearing impaired. The network had 12.5 million subscribers nationally when it was sold to the Discovery Channel. In the 1990s he owned TSN Marketing, an international marketing company.
