= Hybrid solar lighting =

Use of both solar and artificial light

Hybrid solar lighting (HSL) or hybrid lighting systems combine the use of solar with artificial light for interior illumination by channelling sunlight through fiber-optic cable bundles to provide solar light into rooms without windows or skylights, and by supplementing this natural light with artificial light—typically LED—as required.

The bundles are led from exterior/rooftop optical light collectors through small openings or cable ducts and carry the light to where it is needed. The optical fibers end in hybrid luminaires where the sunlight is joined with electric light, either on demand or to automatically maintain a constant light level even as the available sunlight decreases.

== Method of operation ==
Solar lighting systems capture light from the sun and conduct it towards a room using optical fibers. They use rooftop collectors: mirrored dishes that track the sun. The collectors adjust to aim the sunlight onto a bundle of optical fibers which are contained within a single cable. The optical fibers are flexible and can be connected to hybrid light fixtures with diffusing rods that disperse the light. A single collector can power several hybrid light fixtures.

The hybrid lights also use artificial lighting which is mixed with the natural sunlight. Photosensors determine how much light needs to be generated to add to the natural light to keep a room well illuminated. Hybrid solar lighting systems should be used in rooms with direct roof access.

== See also ==
- Solar energy
- Renewable energy
- Photovoltaics
- Sustainable energy
- Light tube
- Solar thermal collector
