= François Villette =

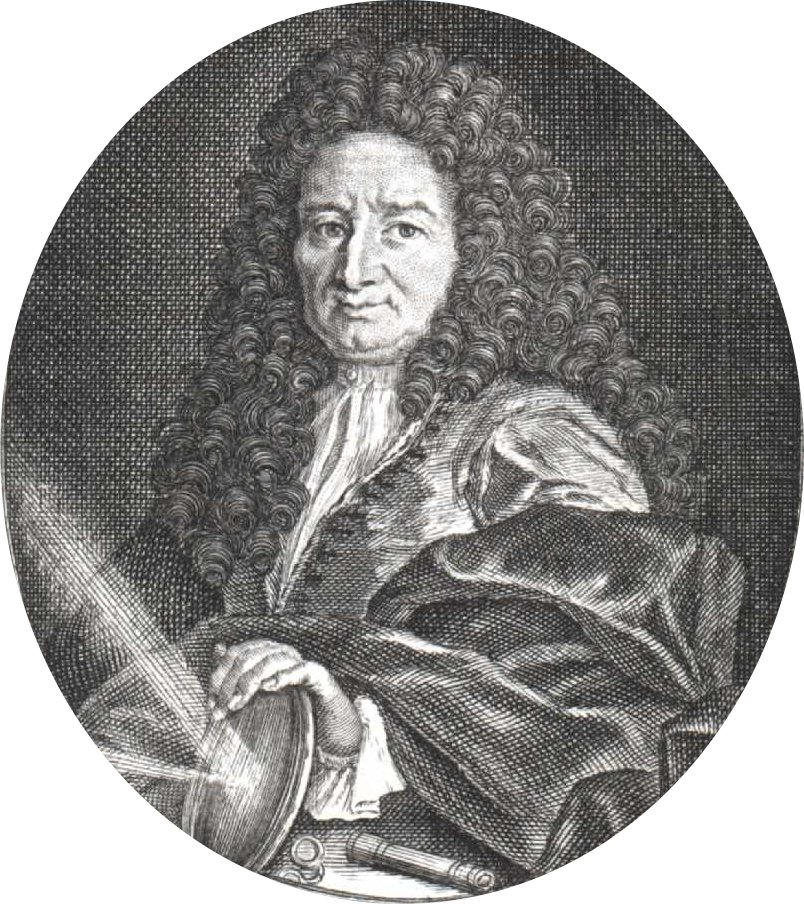
Engraving of François Villette by Etienne Jehandier Desrochers, 1668-1741

François Villette (French pronunciation: [fʁɑ̃swa vilɛt]; 1621- 1698) was an engineer, optician and fireworks expert at the court of Louis XIV of France. An early demonstrator of the potential of solar energy technology, he designed a tin-plated bronze mirror, almost one meter in diameter, which he used to reflect the sun’s rays onto objects which melted from the high temperatures produced. It was demonstrated with great effect at the court of Versailles.

It could melt pot-iron in 50 seconds, and vitrify quarry-stone in 45 seconds.

== Biography ==
François Villette designed a mirror made of tin-plated bronze, almost a meter in diameter, which he used to reflect the sun's rays onto objects, melting them due to the high temperatures produced. It was demonstrated with great effectiveness at the Court of Palace of Versailles.
