= Nanocrystal solar cell =

Electricity generating device

Efficiency of different solar cells.

Nanocrystal solar cells are solar cells based on a substrate with a coating of nanocrystals. The nanocrystals are typically based on silicon, CdTe or CIGS and the substrates are generally silicon or various organic conductors. Quantum dot solar cells are a variant of this approach which take advantage of quantum mechanical effects to extract further performance. Dye-sensitized solar cells are another related approach, but in this case the nano-structuring is a part of the substrate.

Previous fabrication methods relied on expensive molecular beam epitaxy processes, but colloidal synthesis allows for cheaper manufacturing. A thin film of nanocrystals is obtained by a process known as "spin-coating". This involves placing an amount of the quantum dot solution onto a flat substrate, which is then rotated very quickly. The solution spreads out uniformly, and the substrate is spun until the required thickness is achieved.

Quantum dot based photovoltaic cells based on dye-sensitized colloidal TiO_{2} films were investigated in 1991 and were found to exhibit promising efficiency of converting incident light energy to electrical energy, and to be incredibly encouraging due to the low cost of materials used. A single-nanocrystal (channel) architecture in which an array of single particles between the electrodes, each separated by ~1 exciton diffusion length, was proposed to improve the device efficiency and research on this type of solar cell is being conducted by groups at Stanford, Berkeley and the University of Tokyo.

Although research is still in its infancy, nanocrystal photovoltaics may offer advantages such as flexibility (quantum dot-polymer composite photovoltaics) lower costs, clean power generation and an efficiency of 65%, compared to around 20 to 25% for first-generation, crystalline silicon-based photovoltaics in the future.

It is argued that many measurements of the efficiency of the nanocrystal solar cell are incorrect and that nanocrystal solar cells are not suitable for large scale manufacturing.

Recent research has experimented with lead selenide (PbSe) semiconductor, as well as with cadmium telluride photovoltaics (CdTe), which has already been well established in the production of second-generation thin film solar cells. Other materials are being researched as well.

== Other third generation solar cells ==
- Photoelectrochemical cell
- Polymer solar cell
- Perovskite solar cell

== See also ==
- Nanocrystalline silicon
- Nanoparticle
