= Solar Academy International =

Solar Academy International is a global Solar energy training school network. Solar Academy International's first training center, Ontario Solar Academy, was established in 2009 in Toronto, Ontario, Canada. Entrepreneurs and founders of Solar Academy International, Jacob Travis and David Gower, created the training school in response to demands by solar companies experiencing a shortage in qualified workers within the solar industry, following the surge in interest in solar energy upon the passing of the Ontario Green Energy Act 2009 that led to the creation of the Feed-in Tariff Program. Today, Solar Academy International is the largest training school in Canada, having trained over 700 student graduates, with operations expanding overseas.

The school's most popular class is a 5-day intensive course in which students are taught the fundamental basics of the solar industry including aspects of design, sales, and installation by NABCEP-certified installers. Instructors have, in addition to sharing a wealth of field experience and knowledge in best practices, been known to take on students for solar projects, offering practical, paid experience to beginners looking to enter the solar industry. The course concludes with a field trip to a LEED-certified Platinum facility with an operational solar PV system. This intensive course also satisfies the education requirements laid out by the North American Board of Certified Energy Practitioners (NABCEP) for the Entry Level Program. Students who have completed the course are eligible to write the NABCEP Entry Level Exam at one of Castle Worldwide's testing facilities by registering through the Academy.

Solar Academy International also recently started offering a multiple month internship program for interested applicants to get both knowledge and experience into the solar industry. The internship is tailored to the intern's strengths and interests and offers flexibility in length and scope.

== Ontario Solar Academy ==
On August 27, 2010, the then-named Ontario Solar Academy was the first solar PV training school in Canada to receive the Institute for Sustainable Power Quality (ISPQ) accreditation by the Interstate Renewable Energy Council. ISPQ Accreditation is internationally recognized for having high standards in solar energy education and is awarded to training providers. Enrollment in the course surged upon approval of this accreditation, with many students satisfied with the quality of instruction and comprehensiveness of the introductory course.

== Course Location ==
Courses in Canada are held at the Franken Solar facilities in Mississauga, Ontario. Past courses have also been held in select cities in the United States. Workshops in Miami and Toronto are slated to take place in December 2014.
