= Solar challenge =

Solar challenge refers to races between solar powered vehicles, such as:

- World Solar Challenge, a biennial (odd years) worldwide event in Australia, first held in 1987
- American Solar Challenge, a biennial (even years) US event, first held in 1990
- Dell-Winston School Solar Car Challenge, an annual event for students from the US and (to a lesser extent) other parts of the world, first held in 1995
- Victorian Model Solar Vehicle Challenge, an annual event in Australia for schoolchildren
- South African Solar Challenge, a bi-annual South African event that is to be held for the first time in 2008
- Bharat Solar Challenge, a Solar car race in India
