= Cover =

Cover or covers may refer to:

== Packaging ==
- A lid
- Cover (philately), generic term for envelope or package
- Album cover, the front of the packaging
- Book cover or magazine cover
  - Book design
  - Back cover copy, part of copywriting
- CD and DVD cover, CD and DVD packaging
- Smartphone cover, a mobile phone accessory that protects a mobile phone

== People ==
- Cover (surname)

== Arts, entertainment, and media ==
=== Music ===
==== Albums ====
===== Cover =====
- Cover (Tom Verlaine album), 1984
- Cover (Joan as Policewoman album), 2009

===== Covered =====
- Covered (Cold Chisel album), 2011
- Covered (Macy Gray album), 2012
- Covered (Robert Glasper album), 2015

===== Covers =====
- Covers (Beni album), 2012
- Covers (Regine Velasquez album), 2004
- Covers (Placebo album), 2003
- Covers (Show of Hands album), 2000
- Covers (James Taylor album), 2008
- Covers (Fayray album), 2005
- Covers (Deftones album), 2011
- Covers (The Smithereens album), 2018
- Covers (Zemmoa album), 2018
- Covers (Cat Power album), 2022
- Covers, an album by Break of Reality

==== Extended plays ====
- Covers (A Camp EP), 2009
- Covers (Blessing Offor EP), 2024
- Covers EP (Everything but the Girl), 1992
- Covers (Franz Ferdinand EP), 2009
- Covers (Get Cape. Wear Cape. Fly EP), 2009
- Covers (The Autumns EP), 2001
- Covers (Young Statues EP), 2012

==== Other uses in music ====
- Cover version, a new version of a previously released song
- Cover, an understudy in opera

=== Films ===
- Cover (film), a 2007 American film by Bill Duke
- The Cover (film), a 2021 Spanish film by Secun de la Rosa

=== Magazines ===
- Cover Magazine (publication), a New York City arts monthly publication

== Business ==
- Cover (finance), repurchasing a short order made on the stock/equity, forex or futures markets
- Cover (law), a remedy for the breach of a contract for the receipt of goods
- Cover charge, an entry fee
- Cover (hospitality)
- Cover Corp., parent organization for VTuber idol company Hololive Production

== Deception and concealment ==
- Cover (telecommunications), a communications concealment technique
- Cover, something fake used in a cover-up
- Non-official cover, the identity assumed by an operative who takes a covert role in an organization without official ties to the government
- Official cover, the identity assumed by an operative who takes a position in an organization with diplomatic ties

== Mathematics ==
- Cover (algebra), the concept of an algebraic structure that maps onto another structure in structure-preserving fashion
- Cover (topology), the mathematical concept of a collection of sets whose union contains each set as a subset
- Cover, a pair in the covering relation of a partially ordered set, or the greater element in such a pair
- Cover, in database theory, an equivalent set of constraints
- Covering system in number theory, a finite set of residue classes that cover all integers
- Covering code in coding theory, a set of elements (codewords) such that every element of the space is within a fixed distance of some codeword
- Edge cover, a concept in graph theory
- Vertex cover, a concept in graph theory

== Science and technology ==
- Land cover, physical material on the surface of the earth
- Concrete cover, in engineering, distance between reinforcement and the outer surface of element
- Sedimentary cover, in geology, overlies a basement or crystalline basement

== Military ==
- Defilade, physical barriers or terrain that offer concealment and protection from enemy fire
- Force protection, in the form of surveillance, screening and/or fire support around a friendly troop's defensive perimeter
- Suppressive fire, also known as covering fire
- A term for any type of uniform hat:
  - Campaign cover or campaign hat, a broad-brimmed felt or straw hat
  - Utility cover, the US Marine Corps cap

== Sports ==
- Cover (cricket), a region of the field with respect to the batsman in cricket
- To cover, a term in sports betting regarding a game's point spread

== Other uses ==
- Cover letter, a letter of introduction accompanying another document
- Cover, or covers, the top layer of bedding
- Coverture or couverture, a doctrine in common law relating to a wife's legal status

== See also ==
- Covers 2 (disambiguation)
- Slipcover, protection for a piece of upholstered furniture
- Coverage (disambiguation)
- Covering (disambiguation)
- Uncover (disambiguation)
- Uncovered (disambiguation)
