= Coverage =

Coverage may refer to:

== Filmmaking ==
- Coverage (lens), the size of the image a lens can produce
- Camera coverage, the amount of footage shot and different camera setups used in filming a scene
- Script coverage, a short summary of a script, written by script readers to recommend whether a film should be made

== Media and journalism ==
- Broadcasting, radio, television, etc.
- News ("press coverage", "media coverage"), the communication of selected information on current events

== Music ==
- Coverage, a Descendents/ALL cover band from Calgary, Alberta, Canada
- Coverage (album), a 2003 album by Mandy Moore

== Science and technology ==
- Code coverage measure used in software testing
- Coverage (telecommunication), a measure of cell phone or radio connectivity
- Coverage (information systems), a measure for the quality/completeness of an information service
- Coverage (shot peening), a criterion for quality of shot peening introduced by J.O. Almen in the 1940s
- Coverage data, the mapping of one aspect of data in space, in geographic information systems
- Coverage probability, in statistics
- Coverage (genetics) or sequence coverage, or depth, in genetic sequencing
- Solar coverage rate, a measurement of the proportion of energy that is supplied by solar power

== Other uses ==
- Analyst coverage, securities assigned to a particular financial analyst for regular assessment
- Insurance coverage, the amount and extent of risk covered by an insurer

== See also ==
- Cover (disambiguation)
- Covfefe, a typo of the word seen on Donald Trump's Twitter account
