= Cover Magazine =

Cover Magazine may refer to:

- Cover Magazine (album), a 2001 album by the American band Giant Sand
- Cover Magazine (publication), also called Cover Magazine, the Underground National, was a New York City arts monthly publication

== See also ==
- Cover (disambiguation)
