= Ladakh Renewable Energy Development Agency =

Energy initiative in India

Ladakh Renewable Energy Development Agency (LREDA) is a renewable energy initiative in Ladakh, a mountainous region of India. It has been called "the largest off-grid renewable energy project in the world."

The Himalayan mountains make it difficult to connect the Ladakh region to the main national grid. Historically most electricity was created using diesel generators. However, Ladakh has been called the "roof of the world" with abundant sunlight and clear air making it unusually suitable for solar energy technologies. LREDA was founded in 2000 by the Ladakh Autonomous Hill Development Council that "studied and advised the local government to harness solar energy in the mountainous region." In 2012, Jigmet Takpa, director of LREDA said, "Diesel is highly polluting and its cost is extremely high. In the next five years, the whole of Ladakh will be electrified by hydro, solar or geothermal generated renewable power."

LREDA has a number of initiatives including the Ladakh Renewable Energy Initiative Project (LREI), an off-grid renewable energy development program establish in 2011, which sought to install over the next three years: "11 micro-hydro projects with a total capacity of 11.2 MW, 125 solar-photovoltaic power plants of varying capacities, solar water heaters for 40% of the building in Leh, 3000 solar greenhouses, 4500 solar cookers, solar driers, solar passive housing projects and ground-based heat pumping for space heating."

In 2013, LREDA was awarded the Renewtech India Excellence Award. LREDA also conferred with UNDP GEF's Award 2013, securing first position in capacity addition of solar water heating systems during the year 2013.

== See also ==
- Ministry of New and Renewable Energy
