= Never Before =

Never Before may refer to:

- "Never Before" (song), a song by Deep Purple
- Never Before (The Byrds album)
- Never Before (Cold Chisel album)
