= Covering =

Covering may refer to:

- Window covering, material used to cover a window
- Covering, a mathematical map between topological spaces - see Covering space
- Covering (martial arts), protecting against an opponent's strikes
- The Covering, a studio album by the American Christian heavy metal/hard rock band Stryper
- Covering: The Hidden Assault on Our Civil Rights, a 2006 book by Kenji Yoshini

== See also ==
- Covering a base, in baseball
- Covering sickness, a disease of horses and other members of the family Equidae
- Covering theorem (disambiguation)
- Cover (disambiguation)
