= Uncovered =

Uncovered may refer to:

- Uncovered (John Farnham album), 1980
- Uncovered (Shawn Colvin album), 2015
- Uncovered (Robin Schulz album), 2017
- Uncovered (Steve Harley album), 2020
- Uncovered (film), 1994
- Uncovered: The War on Iraq, a 2004 documentary film
- Uncovered (magazine), a UK magazine dealing with mental health and Wellness issues
- Uncovered (short story collection), a book by Australian author Paul Jennings
- Uncovered (TV series), a television series broadcast on Sky One, 1997–2002
- "Uncovered", a song by Soundgarden from Louder Than Love

== See also ==
- Uncover (disambiguation)
- Cover (disambiguation)
