= Jeffrey Cyphers Wright =

American poet, writer and publisher

Jeffrey Cyphers Wright is an American lyric poet, writer, and publisher. Wright graduated from West Virginia University before coming to New York. Beginning in 1976, Wright studied with Ted Berrigan and Alice Notley at St. Mark's Church in-the-Bowery. He also studied with Allen Ginsberg at Brooklyn College and received an MFA in poetry from there.

== Biography ==
=== Poetry and performance ===
In the late 1970s Wright performed at PS122's avant-garde-arama. He read often at St. Mark's Poetry Project between 1979 and 1990 and served a three-year term on the Project Board of Directors. In 1996, Wright performed in two Museum of Modern Art's poetry series events curated by the late philanthropist and poetry activist Lita Hornick. In the millennial years, he hosted poetry events at the Bowery Poetry Club, La MaMa E.T.C., KGB, and other East Village venues. In 2013, Wright wrote the poetry-play Clubhouse on East 13th Street, which was performed at La MaMa E.T.C. and elsewhere. As a poet in residence at Howl! Happening, Wright produced The Fun Doctrine tv series Howl Happening.

Wright is the author of 20 books of poetry. His poems also appear in twelve anthologies including Best American Poetry 2023 from Scribner https://www.bestamericanpoetry.com/, Out of This World from Crown Press and Thus Spake the Corpse from Black Sparrow Press. He is well known as an impresario, organizing artistic parties and events at La Mama, Howl! Happening, and Zoom readings. He is also a long-time member of Brevitas, a community of invited poets who email short poems to each other and publish a periodic selection. Wright designed a cover for one their 15th anthology . The Brooklyn Rail published a suite of his poems in 2011.

=== Publishing - Cover Magazine and LiveMag! ===
In 1978 Wright started Hard Press , where he published 80 postcards by different artists and poets. A selection of the postcards were included in the book A Secret Location on the Lower East Side, and were displayed at New York Public Library. Hard Press also published five books.

From 1986 until 2001 Wright published 80 issues of Cover Magazine, The Underground National, with the help of estimable artist and writer contributors including Timothy Greenfield-Sanders, Steve Mumford, Sue Scott, Judd Tully, and John Yau. The magazine covered a broad range of arts and culture, profiling many important artists in advance of their heyday. Among others, Wright and Cover editors covered Steve Buscemi, Penny Arcade, Chakaia Booker, Andrea Zittel, Dawoud Bey, Sarah McLachlan, The Cranberries, and artists such as Andres Serrano, Vik Muniz, Martha Diamond, and Doug and Mike Starn. The magazine's interviews with Paul Bowles, William Burroughs, and Rufino Tamayo are among their last. Cover is archived at Fales Library at New York University.

Wright started LiveMag! (Live Mag) in 2007 in response to an invitation from Bob Holman to create an event at the Bowery Poetry Club. Wright's idea was to unite poetry publication in multiple forms: performance, electronic, and print. The magazine is in print and online. It offers a curation of current poetry and visual art and hosts events regularly.

=== Film ===
Wright has made nearly two dozen films including his Pandemic Puppet Jam. https://jeffreycypherswright.com/film/puppet-show/ In 2014 he and Lili White completed a 40-minute video about a community garden issue that documented his eponymous performance The Key Ceremony.In 2023 Luigi Cazzaniga made a biographic film about Wright in conjunction with the NY Public Library. https://jeffreycypherswright.com/film/cuckoo-oclock/

=== Criticism ===
Wright's art criticism has appeared in ARTnews, Art and Antiques, ArtNexus and The Brooklyn Rail. In 2008 the monthly Rail instituted his column of poetry reviews called "Rapid Transit", which ran for five years. Cover and Wright's Live Mag! host arts reviews by Wright and other contributors. Literary criticism also appears in Rain Taxi and the American Book Review. '

=== Collage ===
After 2007, Wright exhibited collages in group shows at Tribes Gallery, 532 Gallery (Thomas Jaeckel, Director) Turtle Point Press, and others. He has a collage in The Unbearables Big Book of Sex (Autonomedia, 2011) and has contributed poems and collages to online venues, including Bicycle Review, Beet, Reading Dance, and Tool: A magazine. In 2010, his visual and performance work was the subject of the solo, participatory exhibit The Good Outlaw at AC Institute. In an A-List preview of the show, The Villager described Wright as a "master collagist." A brief video documentary of the opening event encapsulates the performative and visual experience. Wright showed collages in "Paper View," a two-person exhibit with sculptor Ga Hae Park at Tribes Gallery in 2011. Capital One Bank extended the run by hanging Wright's work in its East 3rd Street branch during the Occupy Wall Street protests. Wright co-curated "Occupy the Walls" at AC Institute in Chelsea, NYC. Savitra D., Bob Holman, and others participated in readings and events associated with the December two-week show of protest posters. Steve Dalichinsky published Wright's collage in his 2013 curated online exhibit "Visual Poetry".

=== Critical response ===
In 1980, a Village Voice article labeled Wright's poetry "street smart." His performance carried crowds and the words had sticking power with which he won a following. Wright has performed at Bob Holman's Bowery Poetry Club. Holman has stated that "Jeff did not just read poems, he lived them.". Joe Maynard devoted a page in Beet to Wright, including a collage, several poems, and a mini review, claiming that "Wright is a terrific poet." Steve Dalachinsky in reviewing the volume in the Brooklyn Rail wrote "Jeff Wright’s book of sonnets, Triple Crown (Spuyten Duyvil), replete with Wright’s collages, offers us a panoramic peek into the sometimes-hyper brain of a mad poet." And among the accolades for jim Feast wrote Triple Crown, in Rain Taxi, "While most contemporary New York School poetry seems aimed at like-minded, coterie hipsters, Wright’s poems ostensibly are directed (as were Shakespeare’s sonnets) to a single ear." According to Sparrow in American Book Review, Wright "invented New Romanticism" in the early 1990s. A poetic movement that was "joyful, communal, erotic, and spontaneous."

Kieron Murphy writing in "Rain Taxi" refers to Cyphers Wright's poetry volume "Erato's Inbox" (Xanadu Press 2025) [as] ..."This picaresque romp through the ages"... While, Jordan Davis in rémarking on Wright's poetry volumes "Doppelgängster" and "Fuel for Love" in American Book Review states ..."The cosmic background radiation of American poetry since before Stephen Foster wrote “Oh Susannah” is a staticky ambient surrealism. Wright is attuned to it"...

=== Awards ===
Wright received a Kathy Acker Award for writing and publishing in 2016. In 2023, he won the James Tate Poetry Prize.

=== Works ===
- Translust Five Fingers Press, 1
- Employment of the Apes (ISBN 093887800X), Chronic Editions, 1981.
- Charges Remember I Did This For You Press, 1982.
- Two (with Yvonne Jacquette). Toothpaste Press 1982.
- Take Over (introduction by Allen Ginsberg). Toothpaste Press, 1983.
- All in All (preface by Alice Notley). Gull Press, 1986.
- Walking on Words Vendetta Press, 1996.
- Drowning Light New York: Soncino Press,1992.
- Flourish New York: Soncino Press, 2004.
- The Name Poems New York: Sisyphus Press, 2005.
- October Centerfold New York: Dummy Books, 2009.
- Triple Crown Sonnets (ISBN 978-1-881471-23-3). New York: Spuyten Duyvil, 2013
- Blue Lyre (ISBN 978-1-939929-96-9). New York: Dos Madres Press, 2018
- Party Everywhere (ISBN 978-0-9760793-9-2).New York: Xanadu Press 2014, expanded edition issued 2020
- Doppelgängster (ISBN 978-1-952335-58-7) MadHat Press, 2023
- Fuel for Love (ISBN 978-1-912963-45-4) Survision Books, 2024
- Erato's Inbox, An AI-Luminated Manuscript (ISBN 978-0-998900469) Xanadu Press, 2025
