= Minder =

Escort or caregiver

A minder is the person assigned to guide or escort a visitor, or to provide protection to somebody, or to otherwise assist or take care of something, i.e. a person who "minds".

Government-appointed persons to accompany foreign visitors are often termed minders, assigned to offer assistance such as acting as a guide or as a translator, or protection in dangerous areas, or to define areas of permitted travel. Often they are perceived as also attempting to censor or otherwise control the flow of information to the visitor. Government appointed minders are used in North Korea.

Minders can also be personal bodyguards or protectors, either in an official capacity such as protecting celebrities or VIPs, or in an unofficial capacity as a protector of members of the criminal underworld, as described by the UK television series Minder.

A minder can also be a term for anyone who looks after the interests of someone or something, such as a talent manager, a caretaker, or a person that ensures that a certain official protocol or plan is adhered to by others, or someone that is designated to look after someone who needs assistance (cf. UK English: Child minder for nanny).

== See also ==
- Agent handling
- Tourism in Bhutan
- Tourism in North Korea
