= Besides (Cold Chisel album) =

Compilation album by Cold Chisel
- Released: 21 July 2011
- Genre: Rock; Blues
- Label: Cold Chisel Pty Ltd.

Cold Chisel chronology
Never Before (2011)	Besides (2011)	Covered (2011)

Besides is a compilation album of B-sides, bonus tracks and rarities, released digitally only in July 2011 by Australian rock band, Cold Chisel.

== Track listing ==
No.	Title	Writer(s)	Notes	Length
1.	"Knockin' on Heaven's Door" (Bob Dylan song)	Bob Dylan	East 7" bonus single	5:50
2.	"The Party’s Over"		East 7" bonus single	3:01
3.	"Goodbye (Astrid Goodbye)"	Don Walker; Jimmy Barnes	7" single version	2:44
4.	"Georgia on My Mind" (Ray Charles song)	Hoagy Carmichael; Stuart Gorrell	7" single version	4:42
5.	"Conversations" (live)		B-side to "Choirgirl"	4:05
6.	"Khe Sanh" (live)	Don Walker	B-side to "Choirgirl"	3:56
7.	"Misfits"	Don Walker	B-side to "My Baby"	4:20
8.	"The Dummy"		rare compilation track	4:22
9.	"Hold Me"		The Last Wave of Summer bonus track	3:55
10.	"Child of Mine"		The Last Wave of Summer bonus track	3:05
11.	"The Smalltown Motel Blues"		The Last Wave of Summer bonus track	4:56
12.	"Fallen Angels"		The Last Wave of Summer bonus track	3:32
13.	"A Better Time, a Better Place"		The Last Wave of Summer bonus track	5:12
14.	"Way Down"		The Last Wave of Summer bonus track	3:48
15.	"It Will Always be You"		The Lave Wave of Summer out-take	4:24
16.	"H-Hour Hotel"		1976 demo	3:28
17.	"On the Road"		First album out-take	3:12
