= Levi Yissar =

Israeli engineer and entrepreneur

- לוי ישר
- Occupations: Engineer, Entrepreneur
- Known for: Built the first prototype Israeli solar water heater
- Notable work: Founder of NerYah Company

Levi Yissar (Hebrew: לוי ישר) was an Israeli engineer and entrepreneur. He built the first prototype Israeli solar water heater.

In the 1950s there was a fuel and electricity shortage in the new Israeli state, and the government forbade heating water between 10 p.m. and 6 p.m. As the situation worsened, Yissar proposed that instead of building more electrical generators, homes should switch to solar water heaters. He built a prototype in his home, and in 1953 he started NerYah Company, Israel's first commercial manufacturer of solar water heaters.

By 1967 around one in twenty households heated their water with the sun and 50,000 solar heaters had been sold. However, cheap oil from Iran and from oil fields captured in the Six-Day War made Israeli electricity cheaper and the demand for solar heaters to drop. Following the energy crisis in the 1970s, the Israeli Knesset passed a law requiring the installation of solar water heaters in all new homes (except high towers with insufficient roof area).
