= Toronto Solar Neighbourhoods Initiative =

Solar water heating project in Canada

Toronto Solar Neighbourhoods Initiative (“Solar Neighbourhoods”) is a joint project of the Atmospheric Fund and Toronto Energy Efficiency Office, with support from the Toronto Environment Office and Toronto Hydro. Its goal is to encourage the installation of solar water heating systems in Toronto homes through financial incentives and other support to both homeowners and the local solar industry. Phase I (2008-2009) of the pilot project is targeting homes in Toronto’s Ward 30. The program was developed based on a directive in Toronto’s “Climate Change, Clean Air and Sustainable Energy Action Plan”, which was approved by Toronto City Council in June 2007.

== Name ==
Official named the Toronto Solar Neighbourhoods Initiative, the pilot program is referred to as "Solar Neighbourhoods" for short.

== Funding ==
Solar Neighbourhoods was made possible by a provincially mandated grant of $400,000 from the Portlands Energy Centre, a natural gas-based power plant located within Ward 30, to go toward local air quality initiatives.

== Process ==
The Solar Neighbourhoods program offers incentives of up to $1,000 towards the purchase of solar water heating systems for eligible residents. Those who participate can choose to receive $1,000 up-front towards the cost of their system or a $500 up-front rebate along with zero-interest financing to cover the cost of the system (up to $10,000). In order to qualify for these savings homeowners must live within Ward 30, and have an ecoENERGY home assessment with the selected auditing partner, Windfall Ecology Centre. This ecoENERGY assessment is necessary to access federal and provincial government solar hot water incentives, as well as incentives for a number of other home energy improvements through the ecoENERGY-Retrofit Homes program. The installation must be done by a Solar Neighbourhoods eligible contractor who has met basic requirements, including Canadian Solar Industry Association (CanSIA) membership, using CanSIA certified installers, providing basic labour and equipment warranties, and maintaining adequate WSIB and commercial insurance. This incentive can be received in conjunction with other government incentives such as the ecoENERGY incentive, Ontario Home Energy Savings Program and 2009 Home Renovation Tax Credit.

== Community Partners ==
Solar Neighbourhoods works in conjunction with a local solar buying club called the Riverdale Initiative for Solar Energy (RISE Again), which is bringing together neighbours in Riverdale to purchase both solar water heating systems and solar photovoltaic systems. A number of community solar buying groups exist across Toronto and southern Ontario, and are working together under the OurPower.ca umbrella.
