= Uncover =

Uncover may refer to:

- Uncover (EP), EP by Swedish singer Zara Larsson
  - Uncover (song), the title track
- "Uncover", a song by Loona Odd Eye Circle from Max & Match
- UnCover, an online database at the Colorado Alliance of Research Libraries
- Uncover (podcast), a CBC produced true crime podcast
- UNCOVER, James Webb Space Telescope deep-sky survey

== See also ==
- Uncovered (disambiguation)
- Cover (disambiguation)
