= Tradecraft =

Espionage techniques

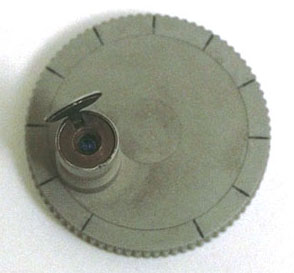
This Mark IV microdot camera could be used to take pictures of documents. The microdot film was so tiny it could be hidden in a spy's personal effects and smuggled out of a location.

Tradecraft, within the intelligence community, refers to the techniques, methods, and technologies used in modern espionage (spying) and generally as part of the activity of intelligence assessment. This includes general topics or techniques (dead drops, for example), or the specific techniques of a nation or organization (the particular form of encryption (encoding) used by the National Security Agency, for example).

== Examples ==
- Agent handling is the management of espionage agents, principal agents, and agent networks (called "assets") by intelligence officers, who are typically known as case officers.
- Analytic tradecraft is the body of specific methods for intelligence analysis.
- Black bag operations are covert or clandestine entries into structures or locations to obtain information for human intelligence operations. This may require breaking and entering, lock picking, safe cracking, key impressions, fingerprinting, photography, electronic surveillance (including audio and video surveillance), mail manipulation ("flaps and seals"), forgery, and a host of other related skills.

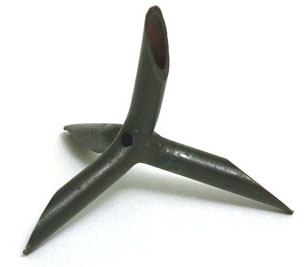
Caltrop used by the US Office of Strategic Services. When scattered on a roadway or runway, the hollow spikes puncture self-sealing rubber tires. The hole in the center allows air to escape even if the other ends of the tube are sealed by soft ground.

- Concealment devices are used to hide things for the purpose of secrecy or security. Examples in espionage include dead drop spikes for transferring notes or small items to other people, and hollowed-out coins or teeth for concealing suicide pills.
- Cryptography is the practice and study of techniques for secure communication in the presence of third parties (called adversaries). More generally, it is about constructing and analyzing communications protocols that block adversaries.
- A cut-out is a mutually trusted intermediary, method or channel of communication, facilitating the exchange of information between agents. People playing the role of cutouts usually only know the source and destination of the information to be transmitted, but are unaware of the identities of any other persons involved in the espionage process. Thus, a captured cutout cannot be used to identify members of an espionage cell.
- A dead drop or "dead letter box" is a method of espionage tradecraft used to pass items between two individuals using a secret location and thus does not require them to meet directly. Using a dead drop permits a case officer and agent to exchange objects and information while maintaining operational security. The method stands in contrast to the 'live drop', so-called because two persons meet to exchange items or information.
- "Drycleaning" is a countersurveillance technique for discerning how many "tails" (following enemy agents) an agent is being followed by, and by moving about, seemingly oblivious to being tailed, perhaps losing some or all of those doing surveillance.
- Eavesdropping is secretly listening to the conversation of others without their consent, typically using a hidden microphone or a "bugged" or "tapped" phone line.
- False flag operations is a covert military or paramilitary operation designed to deceive in such a way that the operations appear as though they are being carried out by entities, groups, or nations other than those who actually planned and executed them. Operations carried out during peace-time by civilian organizations, as well as covert government agencies, may by extension be called false flag.
- A front organization is any entity set up by and controlled by another organization, such as intelligence agencies. Front organizations can act for the parent group without the actions being attributed to the parent group. A front organization may appear to be a business, a foundation, or another organization.
- A honey trap is a deceptive operation in which an attractive agent lures a targeted person into a romantic liaison and encourages them to divulge secret information during or after a sexual encounter.
- Interrogation is a type of interviewing employed by officers of the police, military, and intelligence agencies with the goal of eliciting useful information from an uncooperative suspect. Interrogation may involve a diverse array of techniques, ranging from developing a rapport with the subject, to repeated questions, to sleep deprivation and other forms of torture.

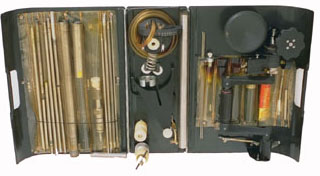
"Belly-buster", a hand-cranked audio drill strapped to an agent's stomach. It was used during the late 1950s and early 1960s to covertly drill holes into masonry for implanting audio devices, such as microphones.

- A legend refers to a person with a well-prepared and credible made-up identity (cover background) who may attempt to infiltrate a target organization, as opposed to recruiting a pre-existing employee whose knowledge can be exploited.
- A limited hangout is a partial admission of wrongdoing, with the intent of shutting down the further inquiry.
- A microdot is text or an image substantially reduced in size onto a small disc to prevent detection by unintended recipients or officials who are searching for them. Microdots are, fundamentally, a steganographic approach to message protection. In Germany after the Berlin Wall was erected, special cameras were used to generate microdots that were then adhered to letters and sent through the mail. These microdots often went unnoticed by inspectors, and information could be read by the intended recipient using a microscope.
- A one-time pad is an encryption technique that cannot be cracked if used correctly. In this technique, a plaintext is paired with random, secret key (or pad).
- One-way voice link is typically a radio-based communication method used by spy networks to communicate with agents in the field typically (but not exclusively) using shortwave radio frequencies. Since the 1970s infrared point to point communication systems have been used that offer one-way voice links, but the number of users was always limited. A numbers station is an example of a one-way voice link, often broadcasting to a field agent who may already know the intended meaning of the code, or use a one-time pad to decode. These numbers stations will continue to broadcast gibberish or random messages according to their usual schedule; this is done to expend the resources of one's adversaries as they try in vain to make sense of the data, and to avoid revealing the purpose of the station or activity of agents by broadcasting solely when needed.
- Steganography is the art or practice of concealing a message, image, or file within another message, image, or file. Generally, the hidden message will appear to be (or be part of) something else: images, articles, shopping lists, or some other cover text. For example, the hidden message may be in invisible ink between the visible lines of a private letter. The advantage of steganography over cryptography alone is that the intended secret message does not attract attention to itself as an object of scrutiny. Plainly visible encrypted messages—no matter how unbreakable—will arouse interest, and may in themselves be incriminating in countries where encryption is illegal. Cover achieves the same end by making the communication appear random or innocuous.
- Surveillance is the monitoring of the behavior, activities, or other changing information, usually of people for the purpose of influencing, managing, directing, or protecting them. This can include observation from a distance by means of electronic equipment (such as CCTV cameras), or interception of electronically transmitted information (such as Internet traffic or phone calls); and it can include simple, relatively no- or low-technology methods such as human intelligence agents watching a person and postal interception. The word surveillance comes from a French phrase for "watching over" ("sur" means "from above" and "veiller" means "to watch").
- TEMPEST is a National Security Agency specification and NATO certification referring to spying on information systems through compromising emanations such as unintentional radio or electrical signals, sounds, and vibrations. TEMPEST covers both methods to spy upon others and also how to shield equipment against such spying. The protection efforts are also known as emission security (EMSEC), which is a subset of communications security (COMSEC).

== In popular culture ==
=== In books ===
In the books of such spy novelists as Ian Fleming, John le Carré and Tom Clancy, characters frequently engage in tradecraft, e.g. making or retrieving items from "dead drops", "dry cleaning", and wiring, using, or sweeping for intelligence gathering devices, such as cameras or microphones hidden in the subjects' quarters, vehicles, clothing, or accessories.

=== In film ===
- In the 2012 film Zero Dark Thirty, the main CIA operative Maya noted that her suspected senior al-Qaeda courier was exhibiting signs of using tradecraft.
- In the 2006 action thriller motion picture Mission: Impossible III, an operative hid a microdot on the back of a postage stamp. The microdot contained a magnetically stored video file.
- In the 2003 sci-fi film Paycheck, a microdot is a key plot element; the film shows how well a microdot can be made to blend into an environment and how much information such a dot can carry.
- In the Bourne film franchise, Jason Bourne consistently utilizes his skills of tradecraft, such as tracking people, faking death, creating confusion, arranging meetings as a strategy, escape and evade, and cell phone communications.

== See also ==
- Clandestine HUMINT operational techniques
- United States Geospatial Intelligence Foundation
