= Coverage (lens) =

Size of the image a lens can produce

The coverage of a lens is the size of the image it can produce, measured as the diameter of the image circle produced by the optics. In a camera system the coverage must be large enough to cover the sensor or film used. In a view camera system, because the film plane can be moved independently of the lens plane, the lens must have enough coverage to cover the film while it is offset from the center of the coverage area. Inadequate coverage can lead to vignetting.

Sensors in modern digital cameras come in several sizes. Some popular sizes include "full-frame" or 35mm, APS-C, and 1-inch. Lenses are often intended to work with one of these sensor formats, but in some cases a lens can be used with multiple formats. A “full-frame” type lens produces an image circle that is large enough to cover a 35mm sensor. Because APS-C sensors are smaller than 35mm sensors a full frame lens should be compatible with an APS-C sensor. An APS-C type lens often does not have the coverage to cast light on the entirety of a 35mm sensor, causing dark corners in the images.

One common misconception about lenses is that focal length determines the angle of view for a lens, when in reality it is a combination of focal length, lens coverage, and sensor size. A lens of a certain focal length on a large sensor will yield a wider angle of view than the same lens used with a smaller sensor.
