= Covered (Cold Chisel album) =

Compilation album by Cold Chisel
- Released: 19 August 2011
- Recorded: 1978–2011
- Genre: Rock, Blues, Classic rock
- Label: Cold Chisel Pty Ltd.

Cold Chisel chronology
| Besides (2011) | Covered (2011) | The Best of Cold Chisel (2011) |

Covered is a compilation album of cover versions, released digitally only in August 2011 by Australian rock band, Cold Chisel. It reached the top 100 on the ARIA Albums Chart, and peaked at number 11 on the iTunes chart.

== Track listing ==
| No. | Title | Writer(s) | Notes (s) | Length |
|---|---|---|---|---|
| 1. | "Wild Thing" (live) | Chip Taylor | The Troggs song | 5:01 |
| 2. | "Georgia on My Mind" (studio recording) | Hoagy Carmichael; Stuart Gorrell | Ray Charles song | 4:42 |
| 3. | "Knockin' on Heaven's Door" (studio recording) | Bob Dylan | Bob Dylan song | 5:51 |
| 4. | "Long As I Can See the Light" (live) | John Fogerty | Creedence Clearwater Revival song | 4:46 |
| 5. | "Don’t Let Go" (live) | Jesse Stone | | 4:13 |
| 6. | "It's Only Make Believe" (live) | Jack Nance; Conway Twitty | Conway Twitty song | 2:51 |
| 7. | "River Deep – Mountain High" (live) | Phil Spector; Jeff Barry; Ellie Greenwich | Ike & Tina Turner song | 3:12 |
| 8. | "Let’s Go Get Stoned" (live) | Nickolas Ashford, Valerie Simpson; Josephine Armstead | The Coasters song | 5:11 |
| 9. | "When Something is Wrong with My Baby" (live) | Isaac Hayes, David Porter | Sam & Dave song | 5:52 |
| 10. | "Forever Young" (live) | Bob Dylan | Bob Dylan song | 5:31 |
| 11. | "Cry Me a River" (live) | Arthur Hamilton | Julie London song | 3:44 |
| 12. | "Big River" (live) | Johnny Cash | Johnny Cash song | 2:52 |
| 13. | "Sunshine" (live) | Paul Hewson | Dragon song | 5:54 |
| 14. | "Light My Fire" (bootleg) | The Doors | The Doors song | 6:02 |
| 15. | "Guilty" (bootleg) | Randy Newman | Randy Newman song | 4:52 |
