= Covering (martial arts) =

Covering in martial arts is the act of protecting against an opponent's strikes by using the arms and shoulders to block and absorb the impact of strikes on the head and torso and prevent injury. Covering is the last line of defense to avoid an incoming strike and consists of putting arms and forearms up and in front of the area on the body that is being blocked. The technique of covering is widely used among martial arts and has a multitude of variations.

== Usage ==
Covering is used as a defensive technique and can function on three levels of execution. The first level is for Physical Defense and is used to absorb an opponent's attacks, without the use of counter-attacks or evasive maneuvers. This done by putting hands in front of ones face to cover and serve as a shield. The second level of usage is Counter Defense, which is a variation of covering that calls for the person covering to respond to the opponents' strikes with a strike while still maintaining cover on themselves. The third level of countering is Awareness Defense which is a covering usage that utilizes predicted movement to defend against an opponent using evasive body positioning and counter-attacks while maintaining a covered position. In each level of defense, covering oneself is used throughout, coupled with other evasive and countering techniques at times.

== Types of Covering ==
=== Boxing Cover ===
Covering in boxing starts in a boxing stance and, upon engaging the incoming strike, the arms and fists raise together with palms facing inwards and boxing gloves pressed firmly against the face to cover up the face and head. To protect the torso, the boxer keeps his or her arms tucked against the body and rotates the hips to protect the midsection and allow punches to slide off the body. Both professional and amateur boxers use this technique of covering.

=== Krav Maga Cover ===
The type of covering utilized in the Israeli hand-to-hand combat system of Krav Maga is based on the Counter Defense level of covering usage. This form of covering, called 'bursting' in Krav Maga, absorbs/ blocks/ deflects/ and counter-attacks simultaneously. Krav Maga covering starts in an athletic fighting stance with both arms raised, fists balled, and palms facing the body. If the opponent is delivering a straight punch, the hand that mirrors the attackers punching hand redirects and blocks the strike, while the opposing cover hand sends an identical straight punch toward the attackers head.

=== Keysi Fighting Method Cover ===
Covering in the Spanish influenced Keysi Fighting Method or KFM, utilizes the defensive covering technique in an offensive manner. KFM utilizes a double arm covering stance called The Pensador which uses the arms that are defending to strike while still maintaining the covering position in front of the face. The strikes used while in The Pensador position range from elbow strikes to punches to head-butts, with each strike executed while maintaining the covering position of the arms in front of the head.

=== Bajiquan Cover ===
Covering in Bajiquan can be seen in 'Liang Yi Zhuang', meaning piercing heart elbow as one of its iconic movements and many of the movements seen in the taolu, Xiaojia and Danda, although this can vary from branches as how they interpret different movements.
