= Coverage (information systems) =

The Coverage of an Information system is a criterion for the completeness of the records in the information system. It is defined as the ratio of the number of instances/records in the system (mostly implemented as a Database) that represent real world entities and the number of entities that exist (in the real world) and should be represented in the information system according to its purpose.

Example: If there are 170 countries in the world and an information system holds 153 country records then the coverage of countries of this information system is 90%.

== Bibliography ==
- https://www.phil-fak.uni-duesseldorf.de/fileadmin/Redaktion/Institute/Informationswissenschaft/stock/271.pdf
- Hood, William W.; Wilson, Concepción S. (2003). "Informetric studies using databases: Opportunities and challenges". Scientometrics. 58 (3). Springer Science and Business Media LLC: 587–608. doi:10.1023/b:scie.0000006882.47115.c6. ISSN 0138-9130. S2CID 12388738.
- Naumann, Felix; Freytag, Johann-Christoph; Leser, Ulf (2004). "Completeness of integrated information sources". Information Systems. 29 (7). Elsevier BV: 583–615. doi:10.1016/j.is.2003.12.005. ISSN 0306-4379.
