= Cover (surname) =

Cover is a surname. Notable people with the surname include:

- Arthur Byron Cover (born 1950), American science fiction author
- Franklin Cover (1928–2006), American actor
- Jaxon Cover (born 2008), Canadian ice hockey player
- Thomas M. Cover (1938–2012), American scientist
- Robert Cover (1943–1986), American law professor, scholar, and activist
