= Cover (telecommunications) =

Communication disguising technique

In telecommunications and tradecraft, cover is the technique of concealing or altering the characteristics of communications patterns for the purpose of denying an unauthorized receiver information that would be of value.

The purpose of cover is not to make the communication secure, but to make it look like noise, rendering it uninteresting and not worth analysis. Even if an attacker recognizes the communication as interesting, cover makes traffic analysis more difficult since he must crack the cover before he can find out to whom it is addressed.

Usually, the covered communication is also encrypted. In this way, enemies have no idea you sent a message; friends know you sent a message, but don't know what you said; the intended recipient knows what you said.

Technically, cover sometimes refers to the specific process of modulo two additions of a pseudorandom bit stream generated by a cryptographic device with bits from the control message.

Source: from Federal Standard 1037C and from MIL-STD-188

Some states in the United States, like California, prohibit the recording or covered communications without the consent of all parties of that communication.
