= Never Before (Cold Chisel album) =

Compilation album by Cold Chisel
- Released: 21 July 2011
- Genre: Rock, Blues, Classic rock
- Label: Cold Chisel Pty Ltd.

Cold Chisel chronology
Standing on the Outside (2007)	Never Before (2011)	Besides (2011)

Never Before is a compilation album previously unreleased tracks and rarities, released digitally only in July 2011 by Australian rock band, Cold Chisel. The album didn't impact the official ARIA Charts, but peaked at number 22 on the iTunes chart.

== Track listing ==
No.	Title	Writer(s)	Notes	Length
1.	"Juliet"	Don Walker	demo, 1977	3:19
2.	"Hold Me Now"	Don Walker	demo, 1977	3:54
3.	"Promise Me You’ll Call"	Jimmy Barnes	demo, 1983	4:53
4.	"When Something Is Wrong with My Baby"	Isaac Hayes, David Porter	live	5:51
5.	"No Good For You"	Ian Moss	live at The Playroom	3:46
6.	"Wild Colonial Boy"	Don Walker	live at The Playroom	5:22
7.	"Forever Young"	Bob Dylan	live from The Last Wave tour	5:31
8.	"Light My Fire"	The Doors	bootleg	6:02
9.	"Guilty"	Randy Newman	bootleg	4:55
10.	"Bal A Versailles" (Don vocal)	Don Walker	Ringside DVD bonus track	4:40
11.	"This Big Old Car"	Don Walker	Ringside DVD bonus track	2:15
12.	"Way Down"	Steve Prestwich	Ringside DVD bonus track	4:10
13.	"Rip it Up"	Robert Blackwell, John Marascalco	bootleg	2:25
