= Cover (law) =

Cover is a term used in the law of contracts to describe a remedy available to a buyer who has received an anticipatory repudiation of a contract for the receipt of goods. Under the Uniform Commercial Code, the buyer is permitted (but not required) to find another source of the same type of goods. The buyer may then file a lawsuit against the breaching seller to recover the difference, if any, between the cost of the goods offered and the cost of the goods actually purchased.

The possibility of cover will prevent a party from being able to sue for specific performance, which is an equitable remedy that requires the buyer have no adequate remedy at law. If the buyer is able to buy elsewhere and sue for the difference, that provides an adequate remedy. This prohibition does not apply, however, to the sale of unique goods such as original works of art, collectibles, real estate, and exclusive rights.

Judge Richard Posner has suggested that the availability of cover allows for efficient breach - that is, that it encourages the most efficient allocation of resources by allowing a seller to breach a contract to sell goods to one buyer when another, more lucrative opportunity comes along. The seller may thus be able to realize a sufficiently increased profit to make more money even after repaying the difference to the original buyer. Therefore, no value is lost in the transaction because the original buyer is in the same position he would have been in but for the breach, and the seller is in a better position.
