= Agent handling =

Spy management

In intelligence organizations, agent handling is the management of so-called agents (called secret agents or spies in common parlance), principal agents, and agent networks (called "assets") by intelligence officers typically known as case officers.

== Human intelligence ==
A primary purpose of intelligence organizations is to penetrate a target with a human agent, or a network of human agents. Such agents can either infiltrate the target, or be recruited "in place". Case officers are professionally trained employees of intelligence organizations that manage human agents and human agent networks. Intelligence that derives from such human sources is known by the abbreviation HUMINT.

Sometimes, agent handling is done indirectly, through "principal agents" that serve as proxies for case officers. It is not uncommon, for example, for a case officer to manage a number of principal agents, who in turn handle agent networks, which are preferably organized in a cellular fashion. In such a case, the principal agent can serve as a "cut-out" for the case officer, buffering him or her from direct contact with the agent network.

Using a principal agent as a cut-out, and ensuring that the human agent network is organized in a cellular fashion, can provide some protection for other agents in the network, as well as for the principal agent, and for the case officer if an agent in the network is compromised. Assuming that standard principles of intelligence tradecraft have been strictly observed by the principal agent and the agents in the network, compromised agents will not be able to identify the case officer, nor the other members of the network. Ideally, agents may work side by side in the same office, and conduct their clandestine collection activities with such discipline, that they will not realize that they are both engaged in espionage, much less members of the same network.

Since an agent can sometimes identify their principal agent, however, or reveal information under interrogation that can lead to the identification of a principal agent, the protection provided by cellular network organization can be time-sensitive.

If principles of intelligence tradecraft have not been strictly observed, it is also possible that compromised agents can reveal information that exposes other members of the network. In the real world of espionage, human lapses are very much the norm, and violations of the principles of tradecraft are common. It is for this reason that agents are ideally trained to resist interrogation for a defined period of time.

If an agent is able to resist interrogation for a defined period of time, the odds improve that other members of the network can be alerted to the compromise.

== Case officer ==
A case officer is an intelligence officer who is a trained specialist in the management of agents and agent networks. Case officers manage human agents and human intelligence networks. Case officers spot potential agents, recruit prospective agents and train agents in tradecraft. Case officers emphasize the elements of tradecraft that enable the agent to acquire needed information, and enable the case officer to communicate with and supervise the agent. Most importantly, case officers train agents in methods of avoiding detection by host nation counter-intelligence organizations.

== Agents, spotting, and recruitment ==
By definition, an "agent" acts on behalf of another, whether another individual, an organization, or a foreign government. Agents can be considered either witting or unwitting, and in some cases, willing or unwilling. Agents typically work under the direction of a principal agent or a case officer. When agents work alone, and are not members of an agent network, they are termed "singletons".

The identification of potential agents is termed "agent spotting" (also termed "talent spotting"). Identifying potential agents, and investigating the details of their personal and professional lives, involves the granular verification of their bona fides. Such activities can include uncovering personal details that leave potential agents vulnerable to coercion, blackmail, or other inducements, such as sexual approaches.

Approaches to potential agents can be multitudinous and considerable time can pass before the potential agent is maneuvered into a position where a recruitment "pitch" can be hazarded.

== Training ==
Agent training often includes techniques of tradecraft such as clandestine communication, including cryptography, the use of one-time pads, the construction of concealment devices, and the employment of dead drops. Other elements of tradecraft include elicitation, surveillance and countersurveillance, photography and the emplacement of audio devices, sensors, or other transmitters. Case officers generally train agents one at a time, in isolation, including only those elements of tradecraft needed to penetrate the target at hand. Case officers will also teach agents how to develop cover for status, and cover for action, meaning how to establish credible pretexts for their presence and behavior while engaged in collection activities. A well-trained and competent agent can conduct their clandestine tasks while under close surveillance, and still evade detection. More advanced agent training can include resistance to interrogation.

== See also ==
- Minder
