= Solar coverage rate =

Percentage of energy from solar sources versus other sources

The solar coverage rate is the percentage of an amount of energy that is provided by the sun. This may be in reference to a solar thermal installation or a photovoltaic installation, i.e. a calculation of solar heat, electricity or total energy produced. The observation period is typically one year. As a general rule, higher values represent improved energy efficiency and improved environmental outcomes.

== General ==
The solar coverage rate is used for need-based planning of solar installations and is a measure of the energetic (non-)dependence on energy sources other than the sun.

Differentiation between solar coverage rate for buildings for:

- water heating,
- room heating,
- required overall heating,
- electricity generation,
- required total energy.

This value depends on the size of the storage unit (hot water tank or storage battery), the size of the harvesting surface (sun collection surface or surface area of photovoltaic modules), and on the amount of energy required. In addition to the total yield, there is another dimension that is important for assessing the effectiveness of a solar facility. This is the total energy loss and storage loss suffered by the facility.

== Cost effectiveness ==
The solar coverage rate cannot be used as the only measure of the cost effectiveness or quality of a facility. Other conditions must be taken into account. Among other factors, the value depends on the size of the facility, the location and orientation of the collectors, the size of storage available and the amount of energy required. A solar coverage rate of 100% would mean that the system's entire energy requirement can be covered by solar energy. For a solar thermal facility in Europe, this would mean that the entire heat requirement could be covered, even on a cold winter's day. On summer days, however, this same facility would produce a very large surplus that could not be used. The facility would have to be heavily over-dimensioned for the summer and could not necessarily be operated economically. A high level of coverage is therefore not always an advantage. Nevertheless, if very high coverage levels are to be achieved, then solutions can be offered in a local heat network.

When planning a solar thermal facility, the optimal goal is to find a balanced compromise between yield, i.e. heat energy provided, and the solar coverage rate. A good compromise between yield and solar coverage usually also represents a good compromise between investment costs for the solar facility and costs saved on conventional energy.
