= Covering theorem =

In mathematics, covering theorem can refer to

- Besicovitch covering theorem
- Jensen's covering theorem
- Vitali covering lemma
