= Cover Magazine (publication) =

US magazine

Cover Magazine, also called Cover Magazine, the Underground National, was a New York City arts monthly publication. The magazine existed from 1986 to 2000. Its stated mission was to be a comprehensive arts magazine--"to cover all the arts in every issue"--which included eclectic music and literary features alongside coverage of film, sculpture, dance, photography, and other visual arts. Interviews with Allen Ginsberg, Rudolfo Tamaya, Elizabeth Murray, Loud Reed, Sarah McClachan, Spike Lee, Andrei Codrescu, and Todd Oldham provide a representative sampling of Cover's contents.

Jeffrey Cyphers Wright edited and published Cover Magazine throughout its existence. A strong cadre of arts and culture contributors and editors worked alongside publisher/editor Jeffrey Cyphers Wright, including John Yau, Robert C. Morgan, Judd Tully, Anthony Bozza, A.D. Coleman, Timothy Greenfield-Sanders, Lee Klein and many others. Cover regularly hosted events at Webster Hall, St. Mark's Church, Limelight, the Tunnel, Darinka, and other venues throughout New York City. These included live music concerts, artist discussions, arts and fashion shows, literary readings, and other arts-related events.
