= Index of solar energy articles =

This is a list of solar energy topics.

== A ==
- Air mass coefficient
- Agrivoltaics
- Artificial photosynthesis

== B ==
- BP Solar
- BrightSource Energy
- Building-integrated photovoltaics

== C ==
- Carbon nanotubes in photovoltaics
- Central solar heating plant
- Community solar farm
- Compact linear Fresnel reflector
- Concentrating photovoltaics
- Concentrating solar power
- Crookes radiometer

== D ==
- Daylighting
- Horace de Saussure
- Desertec
- Drake Landing Solar Community
- Duck curve
- Dye-sensitized solar cell

== E ==
- Effect of sun angle on climate
- Energy tower (downdraft)
- EURO-SOLAR Programme
- European Photovoltaic Industry Association

== F ==
- Feed-in tariff
- First Solar
- Flip Flap
- Floating Solar (Floatovoltaics)
- Fresnel reflector
- Charles Fritts
- Calvin Fuller

== G ==
- Geomagnetic storm
- Global dimming
- Greenhouse
- Growth of photovoltaics

== H ==
- Halo (optical phenomenon)
- Helioseismology
- Heliostat
- Home Energy Storage

== I ==
- Indosolar
- Insolation
- Abram Ioffe
- ISE (Fraunhofer Institute for Solar Energy Systems)
- Ivanpah Solar Power Facility

== J ==
- Jinko Solar

== L ==
- Light tube
- List of photovoltaic power stations
- List of solar thermal power stations
- Loanpal

== M ==
- Magnetic sail
- Auguste Mouchout
- Moura photovoltaic power station

== N ==
- Nanocrystal solar cell
- Net metering
- Nevada Solar One

== P ==
- Parabolic reflector
- Parabolic trough
- Passive solar
- Passive solar building design
- Photoelectric effect
- Photovoltaic array
- Photovoltaic system
- Photovoltaic thermal hybrid solar collector
- Photovoltaics
- Photovoltaics in transport
- Polymer solar cell
- Polytunnel
- PV financial incentives

== R ==
- Row cover

== S ==
- Salt evaporation pond
- Sandia National Laboratories
- Wolfgang Scheffler
- SEGS
- Seasonal thermal energy storage (STES)
- Soil solarization
- Solar air conditioning
- Solar and Heliospheric Observatory
- Solar azimuth angle
- Solar balloon
- Solar bowl
- Solar box cooker
- Solar car
- Solar car racing
- Solar cell
- Solar cell efficiency
- Solar cell research
- Solar-charged vehicle
- Solar chemical
- Solar chimney
- Solar collector
- Solar combisystem
- Solar constant
- Solar cooker
- Solar cooling
- Solar cycle
- Solar Decathlon
- Solar desalination
- Solar easement
- solar eclipse
- Solar Energy Generating Systems
- Solar flare
- Solar fuel
- Solar furnace
- Solar greenhouse (technical)
- Solar heating
- Solar hot water in Australia
- Solar hydrogen panel
- Solar lamp
- Solar map
- Solar maximum
- Solar minimum
- Solar mirror
- Solar nebula
- Solar neon
- Solar Orbiter
- Solar oven
- Solar pond
- Solar power
- Solar power by country
- Solar power in Australia
- Solar power in Canada
- Solar power in China
- Solar power in the European Union
- Solar power in Germany
- Solar power in India
- Solar power in Israel
- Solar power in Japan
- Solar power in Pakistan
- Solar power in Portugal
- Solar power in Romania
- Solar power in Spain
- Solar power in Turkey
- Solar power in the United Kingdom
- Solar power in the United States
- Solar power plants in the Mojave Desert
- Solar power satellite
- Solar power tower
- Solar-powered desalination unit
- Solar-powered pump
- Solar-powered watch
- The Solar Project
- Solar prominence
- Solar proton event
- Solar-pumped laser
- Solar radiation
- Solar radiation pressure
- Solar sail
- Solar savings fraction
- Solar shingles
- Solar still
- Solar thermal collector
- Solar thermal energy
- Solar thermal rocket
- Solar Total Energy Project
- Solar tracker
- Solar updraft tower
- Solar variation
- Solar variation theory
- Solar vehicle
- Solar water disinfection
- Solar water heating
- Solar wind
- Solarium
- SolarPACES
- Sopogy
- Space-based solar power
- Sun
- Sun tanning
- Sunburn
- Sunscreen
- Sunshade

== T ==
- Mária Telkes
- Thin-film
- Timeline of solar cells
- Topaz Solar Farm
- Total spectrum solar concentrator
- Trombe wall

== U ==
- Ubiquitous Energy

== W ==
- World Solar Challenge

== See also ==
- List of environment topics
- List of photovoltaics companies
