= CSHP =

CSHP may refer to:

- Canadian Society of Healthcare-Systems Pharmacy, a professional organization representing the interests of hospital pharmacists in Canada
- Central solar heating plants
