= Keyser Creek =

Creek in Pennsylvania, United States

Keyser Creek Keyser's Creek, Beaver Run, Beaver Creek
- Etymology: Timothy Keys, one of the first settlers in Lackawanna County

Physical characteristics
- Source
  - location: deep valley on West Mountain in Newton Township, Lackawanna County, Pennsylvania
  - elevation: between 1,760 and 1,780 ft (540 and 540 m)
- Mouth
  - location: Lackawanna River in Taylor, Lackawanna County, Pennsylvania
  - coordinates: 41°23′05″N 75°42′12″W
  - elevation: 643 ft (196 m)
- Length: 6.1 mi (9.8 km)
- Basin size: 8.59 mi^{2} (22.2 km^{2})

Basin features
- Progression: Lackawanna River → Susquehanna River → Chesapeake Bay
- Tributaries
  - right: Lindy Creek, Lucky Run

Keyser Creek (historically known as Keyser's Creek, Beaver Run or Beaver Creek) is a tributary of the Lackawanna River in Lackawanna County, Pennsylvania, in the United States. It is approximately 6.1 miles (9.8 km) long and flows through Newton Township, Ransom Township, Scranton, and Taylor. The watershed of the creek has an area of 8.59 square miles (22.2 km^{2}). It is designated as a Coldwater Fishery and a Migratory Fishery. The creek has two named tributaries: Lucky Run and Lindy Creek.

The watershed of Keyser Creek was historically affected by coal mining and has been channelized. It has no flow in dry conditions, although it does have some during and after storms. As of 1991, the watershed is mostly forested. The first white settlers in Lackawanna County settled near the creek in 1769. Keyser Creek is a major second-order tributary of the Lackawanna River. Since 2013, a trailhead of the Lackawanna River Heritage Trail has been situated near the creek. A number of bridges have also been built across the creek.

== Course ==
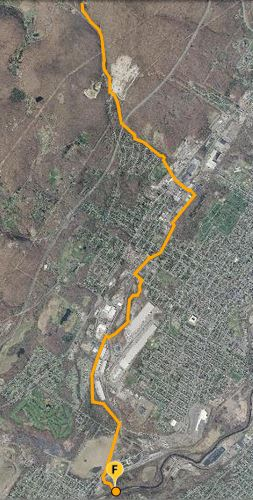
Satellite map of Keyser Creek

Keyser Creek begins in a deep valley on West Mountain in Newton Township. It flows south-southeast for more than a mile, exiting Newton Township, passing through Ransom Township, and entering Scranton. The creek then turns southeast for about a mile, crossing Interstate 476. It then turns southwest for several tenths of a mile and receives Lindy Creek, its first named tributary, from the right. The creek then turns south-southwest for several tenths of a mile and receives Lucky Run, its last named tributary, from the right before turning southwest. After a few tenths of a mile, it turns south-southwest again and eventually turns southeast for a few tenths of a mile before turning south. Several tenths of a mile further downstream, it southeast and then south-southwest. After several tenths of a mile, it reaches its confluence with the Lackawanna River.

Keyser Creek joins the Lackawanna River 7.20 miles (11.59 km) upriver of its mouth.

=== Tributaries ===
Keyser Creek has two named tributaries: Lucky Run and Lindy Creek. Lucky Run joins Keyser Creek 2.32 miles (3.73 km) upstream of its mouth. Its watershed has an area of 1.66 square miles (4.3 km^{2}). Lindy Creek joins Keyser Creek 2.86 miles (4.60 km) upstream of its mouth. Its watershed has an area of 1.53 square miles (4.0 km^{2}).

== Hydrology ==
Some reaches of Keyser Creek experience total flow loss and there is no regular flow in the watershed's lower reaches. There are also extensive piles of culm and silts piled up in the creek's floodplain, left over from the coal mining era. There is at least one sanitary sewer overflow in the watershed. As of 2013, there are an estimated four stormwater detention facilities in the watershed. The creek has no perennial flow, since it loses flow to mine pools during dry weather. For this reason, it is unlikely to attain its designated uses. However, it still has flow during storms. During storm flows, the creek carries large amounts of sediment containing coal waste. Additionally, there are some discharges of rusty water into the creek, in addition to a combined sewer overflow.

The peak annual discharge of Keyser Creek at its mouth has a 10 percent chance of reaching 1,300 cubic feet (37 m^{3}) per second. It has a 2 percent chance of reaching 2,460 cubic feet (70 m^{3}) per second and a 1 percent chance of reaching 3100 cubic feet per second. The peak annual discharge has a 0.2 percent chance of reaching 8,020 cubic feet (227 m^{3}) per second.

The peak annual discharge of Keyser Creek upstream of Lucky Run has a 10 percent chance of reaching 823 cubic feet (23 m^{3}) per second. It has a 2 percent chance of reaching 1,585 cubic feet (45 m^{3}) per second and a 1 percent chance of reaching 2,079 cubic feet (59 m^{3}) per second. The peak annual discharge has a 0.2 percent chance of reaching 3,766 cubic feet (107 m^{3}) per second.

The peak annual discharge of Keyser Creek upstream of Lindy Creek has a 10 percent chance of reaching 950 cubic feet (27 m^{3}) per second. It has a 2 percent chance of reaching 2,200 cubic feet (62 m^{3}) per second and a 1 percent chance of reaching 3,050 cubic feet (86 m^{3}) per second. The peak annual discharge has a 0.2 percent chance of reaching 6,260 cubic feet (177 m^{3}) per second.

In the early 1900s, Keyser Creek was a clear stream until it reached the repair shops of the Delaware, Lackawanna and Western Railroad. At this point, it received some oil and refuse. At the Capouse Shaft, the creek washed an ash bank and a culm bank and was contaminated with some sulfur. More dirty waste materials drained into the creek at the Archbald Colliery and a fertilizer plant also discharged waste into it.

== Geography and geology ==
The elevation near the mouth of Keyser Creek is 643 feet (196 m) above sea level. The elevation near the creek's source is between 1,760 and 1,780 ft (540 and 540 m) above sea level. In its upper reaches, the creek has a gradient on the order of 400 feet per mile (76 m/km). However, in its lower reaches, once it flows off Bald Mountain and into Keyser Valley, its gradient is only on the order of 40 feet per mile (7.6 m/km).

A waterfall known as Fawnwood Falls is in the watershed of Keyser Creek. The Moffat Breaker is in the creek's watershed, as are the ruins of other Moffat Colliery buildings and the remains of some water works. The watershed drains part of West Mountain or Bald Mountain. The creek's headwaters are in springs and wetlands on Bald Mountain/West Mountain. The creek passes through stone and concrete culverts when flowing under Main Avenue. Numerous stream segments have braided flows or channel loss. The creek flows through 21 pipes, whose diameters range from 3 to 36 inches (7.6 to 91.4 cm).

Keyser Creek is topographically very similar to the nearby Saint Johns Creek. In its headwaters, its gradient is steep and it passes through several small cataracts. In its lower reaches, it is in a shallow floodplain. The creek begins in springs and wetlands on a mountain known as Bald Mountain, which has an elevation of 2,000 to 2,300 feet (610 to 700 m) above sea level. At some locations, Keyser Creek has experienced significant erosion, causing sediment and red ash (burned culm) to enter the creek.

Keyser Creek has unstable banks due to abandoned mine impacts. Its banks are shallow and natural cobblestone banks in its lower reaches. However, the creek is channeled and has a steep bank further upstream.

A delta fan made of eroded red ash sediment occurs at the mouth of Keyser Creek. The creek flows through rock formations such as the Llewellyn Formation and the Pocono Formation. conglomerate and limestone have been observed in the creek's vicinity. There are coal measures in the vicinity of the creek. There are pyroclastic materials in foundry slag and coal mining waste in the watershed. Large deposits of drift have been observed near the creek. Substantial till deposits are also present in its valley.

There is a historic flume structure along Keyser Creek. The Pennsylvania Department of Environmental Protection carried out channelization work on 1 mile (1.6 km) of Keyser Creek and its tributary Lindy Creek in 1999 and 2000. Approximately 600 feet (180 m) of the creek is in a rectangular concrete channel. In 2001, the Lackawanna River Watershed Conservation Project proposed a substantial stream channel restoration project on Keyser Creek.

== Watershed ==
The watershed of Keyser Creek has an area of 8.59 square miles (22.2 km^{2}). The watershed is in the western or southwestern section of the Lackawanna River watershed. It occupies parts of Taylor, Scranton, and Ransom Township, as well as a small area in Newton Township. The stream is entirely within the United States Geological Survey quadrangle of Scranton. Upstream of the tributary Lucky Run, its watershed has an area of 4.46 square miles (11.6 km^{2}). Upstream of the tributary Lindy Creek, it has an area of 3.29 square miles (8.5 km^{2}).

As of 1991, nearly 80 percent of the watershed of Keyser Creek is forested land. Approximately 20 percent is residential land. There are also a few small areas of commercial and industrial land. Keyser Creek is an "important" second-order stream. It is one of the larger tributaries of the Lackawanna River. It is a second-order stream. Major roads in the watershed include Keyser Avenue, Luzerne Street, North South Road, Simplex Drive, Washburn Street, and Sherman Avenue.

Keyser Creek is one source of flooding in the borough of Taylor. It is also the only recent flooding source in the borough. In 1971, the creek overflowed after a rainstorm, damaging several yards and lots near Oak Street and First Street. The flooding was caused by a faulty culvert, which was later replaced by the Pennsylvania Department of Transportation.

== History, etymology, and recreation ==
Keyser Creek was entered into the Geographic Names Information System on August 2, 1979. Its identifier in the Geographic Names Information System is 1198972.

The first white settlers in Lackawanna County settled near Keyser Creek. Timothy Keys, Solomon Hocksey, and Andrew Hickman constructed homes at this location in 1769. The creek is named after Timothy Keys. The Pennsylvania Historical and Museum Commission added a Pennsylvania State Historical Marker near the creek in 1948 to commemorate the settlers. Another early settler in the area was Cornelius Atherton, who arrived at a hill overlooking the creek in 1782. In maps from the 1700s, the creek is referred to as Beaver Run or Beaver Creek.

Since the 19th century, Keyser Creek has been heavily impacted by coal mining and railroads. Three steel girder bridges that historically carried the Central New Jersey Railroad across Keyser Creek near its mouth. The bridges now carry the Lackawanna River Heritage Trail. The creek also flows under a stone arch culvert with a length of 250 feet (76 m) near the Canadian Pacific rail yard in Taylor. A steel stringer/multi-beam or girder bridge was constructed across the creek in 1996. It is 117.1 feet (35.7 m) long and carries Washburn Avenue.

In the early 2000s, the Lackawanna River Watershed Conservation Plan recommended that Ransom Township, Newton Township, and the city of Scranton include protection of Keyser Creek in their comprehensive plans, as well as their ordinances for land use, zoning, and subdivision. The creek is on the Pennsylvania Department of Environmental Protection Bureau of Abandoned Mine Reclamation's priority list and the Lackawanna River Corridor Association's priority list for the Lackawanna River watershed.

== Biology ==
The entire drainage basin of Keyser Creek is designated as a Coldwater Fishery and a Migratory Fishery. In the late 1800s, there was a laurel swamp along the creek.

The area in the vicinity of Keyser Creek has experienced habitat loss due to abandoned mine impacts. What remains of the creek's riparian buffer in some reaches is overrun with invasive plants. The understory in the creek's riparian area is covered in knotweed. However, some reaches have riparian buffers containing red maple, silver maple, and river birch.

== Recreation ==
The Lackawanna River Watershed Conservation Project suggested creating a trailhead for the Lackawanna River Heritage Trail at the mouth of Keyser Creek. The section of the trail running from Keyser Creek to Taylor is 2 miles (3.2 km) long and is known as the CNJ Extension. Groundbreaking began on May 14, 2012, and the trail opened in 2013.

== See also ==
- Spring Brook (Lackawanna River), next tributary of the Lackawanna River going downriver
- Stafford Meadow Brook, next tributary of the Lackawanna River going upriver
- List of rivers of Pennsylvania
- List of tributaries of the Lackawanna River
