= Lucky Run =

Lucky Run Lucky Run Creek
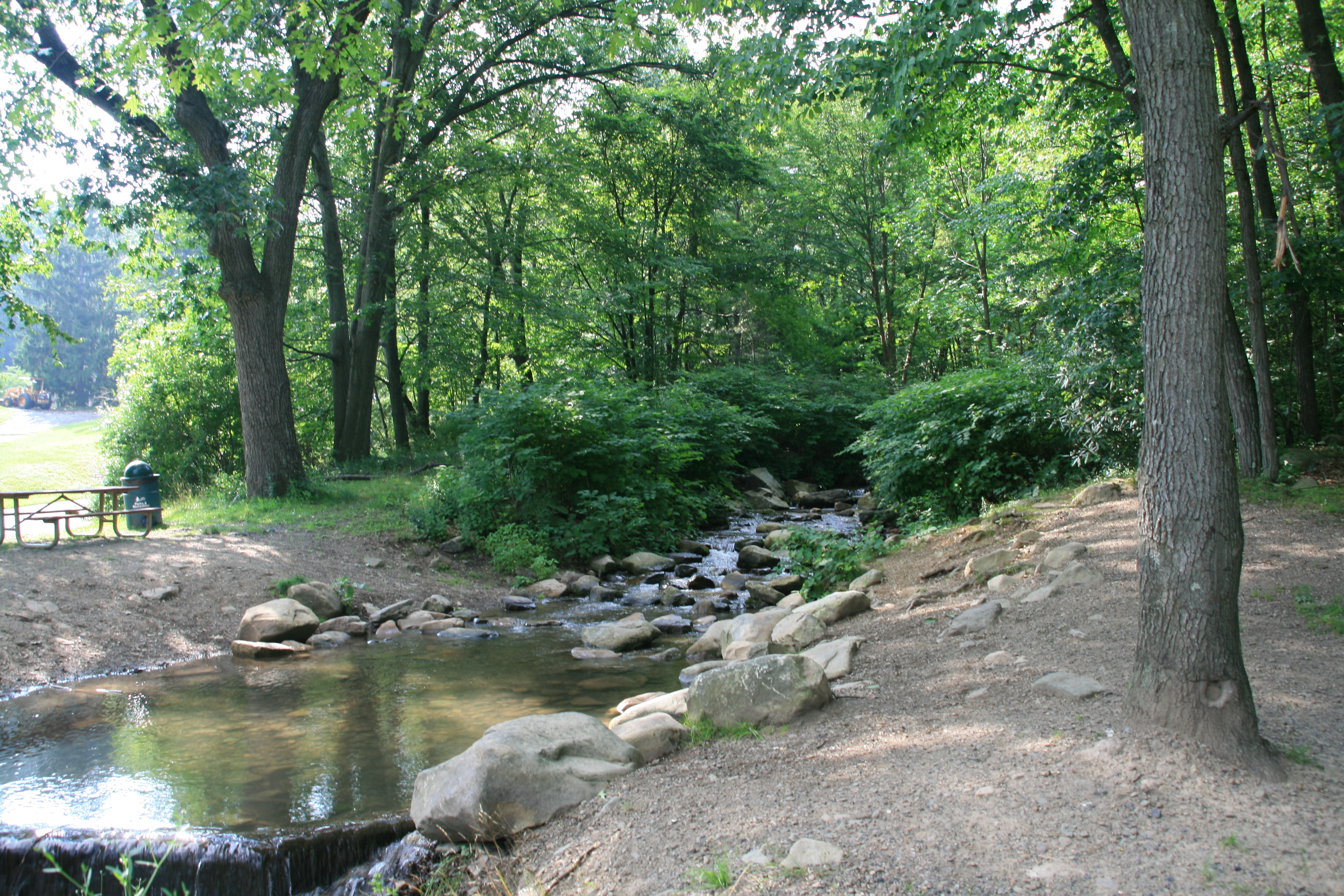
- Looking up Lucky Run in McDade Park across from the Lackawanna Coal Mine Tour.

Physical characteristics
- Source
  - location: Bald Mountain in Ransom Township, Lackawanna County, Pennsylvania
  - elevation: between 1,700 and 1,720 feet (520 and 520 m)
- Mouth
  - location: Keyser Creek in Scranton, Lackawanna County, Pennsylvania
  - coordinates: 41°24′44″N 75°42′01″W
  - elevation: 778 ft (237 m)
- Length: 2.4 mi (3.9 km)
- Basin size: 1.66 mi^{2} (4.3 km^{2})

Basin features
- Progression: Keyser Creek → Lackawanna River → Susquehanna River → Chesapeake Bay

Lucky Run (also known as Lucky Run Creek) is a tributary of Keyser Creek in Lackawanna County, Pennsylvania, in the United States. It is approximately 2.4 miles (3.9 km) long and flows through Ransom Township and Scranton. The watershed of the creek has an area of 1.66 square miles (4.3 km^{2}). It is considered to be a Coldwater Fishery and contains trout. However, it loses flow to underground mine pools. Land uses in its watershed include forests, open space, and industrial land. A county park known as McDade Park is in the stream's vicinity.

== Course ==
Lucky Run begins on Bald Mountain in Ransom Township. It flows down the mountain in a south-southeast direction for several tenths of a mile before turning southeast. After several tenths of a mile, it enters Scranton, crosses Interstate 476, and leaves Bald Mountain behind. For the next several tenths of a mile, it flows southeast near the border between Scranton and Taylor. The stream then turns east for a short distance before turning south. After a few hundred feet, it reaches its confluence with Keyser Creek.

Lucky Run joins Keyser Creek 2.32 miles (3.73 km) upstream of its mouth.

== Hydrology ==
In 2006, the Pennsylvania Turnpike Commission either applied for or received a permit to discharge stormwater into Lucky Run for construction purposes. There is one stormwater detention facility in the watershed. The stream receives runoff from the Pennsylvania Turnpike.

Lucky Run lacks any perennial flow because it loses flow to underground mine pools. For this reason, it is unlikely to attain its designated uses. In 2013, it was recommended that the stream be assessed for flow loss.

== Geography, geology, and climate ==
The elevation near the mouth of Lucky Run is 778 feet (237 m) above sea level. The elevation of the stream's source is between 1,700 and 1,720 feet (520 and 520 m) above sea level. Lucky Run has a steep gradient. In its upper reaches, on West Mountain/Bald Mountain, the stream has a gradient of approximately 400 feet (120 m) per mile. However, in the relatively flat Keyser Valley, its gradient decreases to a mere 40 feet (12 m) per mile.

A mountain known as West Mountain/Bald Mountain is partially in the watershed of Lucky Run. This mountain has an elevation of 2,000 to 2,300 feet (610 to 700 m) above sea level and is part of the Allegheny Front. The stream has a shallow streambank that has been restored with concrete and stone. It flows through ten pipes whose diameters range from 3 to 36 inches (7.6 to 91.4 cm).

The headwaters of Lucky Run are in springs and wetlands on Bald Mountain. One reach of the stream flows over land that has been heavily strip mined. A reach of it was removed by strip mining in the 1940s, but a rock-lined channel was constructed for the stream in the 1970s.

In 2001, the Lackawanna River Watershed Conservation Plan recommended that the stream channel of Lucky Run be restored from McDade Park downstream to its mouth. At that time, the Pennsylvania Bureau of Abandoned Mine Reclamation was near to completing a project involving sealing 800 feet (240 m) of the stream's streambed to prevent infiltration into a mine pool. On 45 percent of Lucky Run, an impervious surface was observed. There is substantial tree debris rerouting the stream and parts of it experience erosion.

In early May 2013, the temperature in the vicinity of Lucky Run was measured to be 72 °F (22 °C).

== Watershed ==
The watershed of Lucky Run has an area of 1.66 square miles (4.3 km^{2}). A large area of the watershed is in Ransom Township and smaller areas are in Scranton and Taylor. The watershed is in the southwestern part of the Lackawanna River watershed. The stream is entirely within the United States Geological Survey quadrangle of Scranton.

Lucky Run is a first-order tributary of Keyser Creek. The part of its watershed that is on West Mountain/Bald Mountain is mainly forested. Other land uses in the watershed include open space and industrial land. The stream's mouth is at an industrial park known as Stauffer Industrial Park. Major roads and bridges in the watershed include Keyser Avenue and Park Edge Lane.

== History ==
Lucky Run was entered into the Geographic Names Information System on August 2, 1979. Its identifier in the Geographic Names Information System is 1199095.

A culvert under Keyser Avenue in the watershed of Lucky Run was repaired in 2013 and 2014.

== Biology ==
Wild trout naturally reproduce in Lucky Run from its headwaters downstream to its mouth. The creek is designated as a Coldwater Fishery.

The riparian area of Lucky Run has sparse areas of trees. It consists of forested land and grassland. The stream's bank is covered with knotweed.

== Recreation ==
A county park known as McDade Park is in the watershed of Lucky Run. It was established in the 1970s. In 2001, the Lackawanna River Watershed Conservation Plan proposed a trail and greenway linking the Lackawanna River Heritage Trail to McDade Park via the stream corridors of Lucky Run and Keyser Creek. Additionally, the Lackawanna Coal Mine Tour site is in the stream's vicinity.

== See also ==
- Lindy Creek, next tributary of Keyser Creek going upstream
- List of rivers of Pennsylvania
