= Lindy Creek =

Physical characteristics
- Source
  - location: pond on Bald Mountain in Ransom Township, Lackawanna County, Pennsylvania
  - elevation: between 1,840 and 1,860 feet (560 and 570 m)
- Mouth
  - location: Keyser Creek in Scranton, Lackawanna County, Pennsylvania
  - coordinates: 41°25′06″N 75°41′46″W
  - elevation: 814 ft (248 m)
- Length: 2.3 mi (3.7 km)
- Basin size: 1.53 sq mi (4.0 km^{2})

Basin features
- Progression: Keyser Creek → Lackawanna River → Susquehanna River → Chesapeake Bay

Lindy Creek is a tributary of Keyser Creek in Lackawanna County, Pennsylvania, in the United States. It is approximately 2.3 miles (3.7 km) long and flows through Ransom Township and Scranton. The watershed of the creek has an area of 1.53 square miles (4.0 km^{2}). The creek is considered to be a Coldwater Fishery. Some reaches of it have been channelized for flood control purposes and it also flows through several pipes. Its gradient is considerably higher in its upper reaches than in its lower reaches. Land uses in the creek's watershed include forests and low-intensity development.

== Course ==
Lindy Creek begins in a pond on Bald Mountain in Ransom Township, not far from the border between Ransom Township and Newton Township. The creek flows south down the mountain for several tenths of a mile before turning southeast and continuing to flow down the mountain. After several tenths of a mile, it enters Scranton and crosses Interstate 476. Several tenths of a mile further downstream, the creek reaches its confluence with Keyser Creek.

Lindy Creek joins Keyser Creek 2.86 miles (4.60 km) upstream of its mouth.

== Hydrology ==
At its mouth, the peak annual discharge of Lindy Creek has a 10 percent chance of reaching 310 cubic feet per second. It has a 2 percent chance of reaching 420 cubic feet per second and a 1 percent chance of reaching 460 cubic feet per second. The peak annual discharge has a 0.2 percent chance of reaching 540 cubic feet per second.

In 2006, the Turnpike Commission either applied for or received a permit to discharge stormwater into Lindy Creek for construction purposes.

In the mid 20th century, the United States Bureau of Mines estimated the surface seepage in the area of Lindy Creek to be 2.60 gallons per minute per inch of rainfall.

== Geography, geology, and climate ==
The elevation near the mouth of Lindy Creek is 814 feet (248 m) above sea level. The elevation of the creek's source is between 1,840 and 1,860 feet (560 and 570 m) above sea level. From its headwaters on West Mountain/Bald Mountain down, into the valley of Keyser Creek, the gradient of Lindy Creek is on the order of 400 feet per mile (76 m/km). However, in its lower reaches, its gradient is only on the order of 40 feet per mile (7.6 m/km).

There is an ice pond dam site along Lindy Creek. Additionally, other historic stone and concrete structures are present in the vicinity of the creek. Its headwaters are in springs and wetlands on Bald Mountain/West Mountain. This mountain is part of the Allegheny Front and has an elevation of 2,000 to 2,300 feet (610 to 700 m) above sea level. Approximately 1,500 feet (460 m) of the creek has been reinforced with rectangular concrete channels. However, in some reaches, such as the section near Frink Street, its banks are natural. The creek has steep streambanks with a height of 8 feet (2.4 m). Two debris basins in the creek's watershed help reduce flooding.

Lindy Creek has been affected by abandoned mine impacts. Upstream of the flood control works near Frink Street, it has been moderate impacted by coal mining. Its channel also receives some residential trash. The creek flows through three pipes, whose diameters range from 3 to 12 inches (7.6 to 30.5 cm). Breached dams and the remains of old water works occur in the creek's vicinity.

In early May 2013, the temperature in the vicinity of Lindy Creek was measured to be 68 °F (20 °C).

== Watershed ==
The watershed of Lindy Creek has an area of 1.53 square miles (4.0 km^{2}). The watershed is mostly in Scranton and Ransom Township, but also occupies a tiny corner of Newton Township. It is in the southwestern part of the Lackawanna River watershed. The creek is entirely within the United States Geological Survey quadrangle of Scranton.

Lindy Creek is a first-order tributary of Keyser Creek. The part of the watershed that is on West Mountain/Bald Mountain is mostly undeveloped and extensively forested. However, low-density residential land is present in the watershed and some future development on the creek in Ransom Township is possible. Major roads and bridges in the watershed include South Keyser Avenue, Frink Street, and the Dewey Avenue Bridge.

== History ==
Lindy Creek was entered into the Geographic Names Information System on August 2, 1979. Its identifier in the Geographic Names Information System is 1199043.

On March 12, 1936, Lindy Creek ran high in its channel during a major flood of the Lackawanna River, but did not overflow its banks. Several other creeks in that area were in a similar situation on that day. However, in June 1936, a flood caused Lindy Creek and two ice ponds in the Keyser Valley to inundate several blocks on Frink Street. This area was the hardest-hit area during that flood.

A reach of Lindy Creek in Scranton was channelized by the Pennsylvania Department of Environmental Protection in 1999 and 2000. The channelization exists for flood control purposes. During Special Session No. 2 of 1996, a flood control project on Lindy Creek and several other creeks was authorized for a cost of $17,400,000. The repair of a retaining wall on the creek was also authorized for $16,000 and a project involving a culvert on the creek was authorized for $36,000. The city of Scranton once received a $13,975 grant for debris removal in the creek's watershed.

== Biology ==
Lindy Creek is designated as a Coldwater Fishery. The creek's riparian area is mainly forested.

== See also ==
- Lucky Run, next tributary of Keyser Creek going downstream
