= Solar collector =

Solar collector may refer to:

- Solar thermal collector, a solar collector that collects heat by absorbing sunlight
- Solar Collector (sculpture), a 2008 interactive light art installation in Cambridge, Ontario, Canada

== See also ==
- Concentrating solar power
- Renewable heat
- Solar air heating
- Solar water heating
- Solar panel
