= Cornelius Atherton =

American manufacturer (1737–1809)

- Born: May 8, 1737; Harvard, Massachusetts, Province of Massachusetts Bay, British America
- Died: December 4, 1809; Afton, New York
- Occupations: Gunsmith, Iron manufacturer and inventor
- Spouses: Mary Delano (m. 1760), Jane Johnson (m. 1786)
- Children: 16

Cornelius Atherton (May 8, 1737 – December 4, 1809), was an iron manufacturer, an inventor and an active gunmaker for patriot causes during the American Revolutionary War. He invented a process for making what was known as "American Steel"; he sold the patent to Frenchmen named Meers. He was superintendent of the armory at Concord owned by John Adams and John Hancock. When the British soldiers left Lexington they went on to Concord and burned the armory to the ground. All the weapons had been moved however. He and his eldest son, John Daniel are recognized as the founders of borough of Taylor, Pennsylvania.

== Early life ==
He was the son of John Atherton (1709-1755) of Harvard, Massachusetts. His paternal great-grandfather was James Atherton (1654-1718) of Lancaster, Massachusetts. His great-great-grandfather James Atherton, emigrated to America, and was one of the founders of Lancaster, Massachusetts.

Various obituaries claim that he is the fourth in descent from Major Gen. Humphrey Atherton of Boston. A further discrepancy in relation to his birthplace by late 19th biographers, was carried over to a submission to the Daughters of the American Revolution during the 20th century. His birthplace was incorrectly stated as Cambridge, Massachusetts. However, with the ease of access to birth and church records that has been proven to be incorrect. Confusion is likely to have arisen due to his close association with both Boston and Cambridge, Massachusetts, through his tradecraft; or that his birthplace of Harvard, Massachusetts was confused with Harvard University in Cambridge, Massachusetts.

His birthdate has also been misquoted as February 5, 1736, instead of May 1737. A number of sources refer to his mother being Mary Sawyer (born Sep 11, 1714); the daughter of James Cornet Sawyer and Mary Prescott. Mary Sawyer did marry a John Atherton on May 25, 1735, in Pomfret, CT. However that is not conclusive proof of a parental link. The Sawyers were however accomplished blacksmiths in at his place of birth and he did carry out that trade. Some researchers have named Phebe Harris (1713-1795) as his mother. What is almost certain is that he was the son of John Atherton and was baptized in Harvard, Massachusetts on May 8, 1737. His maternal line is unproven.

== Career ==
Atherton was a blacksmith by trade and was the first to forge steel in Colonial America. As a resourceful blacksmith, he made the first pair of clothier sheers in America and was also a gun maker at a time when most pistols were imported from England. He also discovered the process of converting iron into ‘American steel’.

In 1763 he relocated to Amenia, NY. Atherton entered into a contract with two merchant brothers, James and Ezra Reed, to superintend the erection of steel works in Amenia, and to instruct their workmen in the art of making steel. The steelworks were erected at Dover Iron Works in Amenia. It became a successful operation, and a decade later, during the American Revolutionary War it supplied muskets for the Continental Army.

Atherton relocated temporarily to Cambridge, Massachusetts, in 1769, after entering into a partnership with Samuel Adams, John Adams and John Hancock. He superintended an existing armory and commenced the manufacture of cutlery and firearms. 6 months later it was burned down by an incendiary, likely to have been placed by British troops who were quartered in Boston, since the colonial authorities suspected their patriotic intentions arming the local population during the time of the Boston Massacre. Hancock's signature would later become the most prominent on the United States Declaration of Independence.

During 1770, Atherton returned to Amenia, Province of New York, and announced in the local paper that he would now be serving the Great Nine Partners Patent area with the manufacture and repair of clothier sheers. Atherton settled in Plymouth, Pennsylvania, in 1773 with his family, where he made farm tools and bells.

He went to Florida, Orange County, New York, in the summer of 1773 and remained there during the war and remained there until 1783. As a patriot, Atherton played a role in preparing for the siege of New York during the New York and New Jersey campaign. Atherton as a gunsmith, concluded an agreement with Agreement with Alexander McDougall and Peter T. Curtenius of the City of New York, acting with authority of the New York Provincial Congress during November 1775. During September the following year, he petitioned the provincial congress for an exemption from military duty for his workmen, whilst they engaged in the manufacture of firearms under Atherton's contract with the provincial congress at the Dover Steel Works. Shortly after he relocated with his family to Plymouth, Pennsylvania.

In 1778 Atherton was drafted, however his place was filled by his eldest son, Jabez, who volunteered to become his substitute, and was accepted and mustered in as a private. This allowed Atherton to care for his wife Mary, who was infirm. His son, Jabez was killed in the Battle of Wyoming on July 3, 1778, and is listed on the Wyoming Monument. The aftermath of the battle meant that Atherton and his family had to leave the area for their safety.

=== Cornelius Atherton & the treason of Benedict Arnold (1780) ===
On September 21, 1780, during the American Revolution, American General Benedict Arnold met with British Major John Andre to discuss handing over Fort Clinton, now known as West Point, New York, to the British, in return for the promise of a large sum of money and a high position in the British army. The plot was foiled and Arnold, a former American hero, became synonymous with the word “traitor.”

His son Cornelius Jr recounted the incident:

“I was informed by my mother years ago, when I was a young man, that on his learning the British ship Vulture was anchored in the river below West Point, my father Cornelius Atherton, with another man (name forgotten) went to a Colonel Livingston, in command of a small battery, five or six miles below West Point, asking him to send a small detachment up on the Heights, and drive the Vulture away, but the Colonel dare not weaken his small force. He finally gave them a twelve pound carronade and two gunners, with ammunition a plenty. In a short time they had their gun in position on the highland banks, within easy range of the Vulture and perfectly safe from her guns. After trying a cold short a few times without effect they improvised a furnace and made the balls red hot, and at the first fire struck a red hot ball in the deck of the vessel. A second and third were equally successful. She cast her cable and took her way down river, out of the way of the guns on the heights. This I believe to be a true statement of the cause of Major Andre’s capture, and saving West Point from falling into the hands of the British. Cornelius Atherton”

Colonel James Livingston of the 1st Canadian Regiment was in command of Verplanck's Point on the Hudson River in September 1780, and played a crucial role in the unmasking of Benedict Arnold's treachery. While on guard duty, his troops fired on the British sloop of war HMS Vulture, forcing it to retreat southwards. This ship had brought Major John André to meet with General Benedict Arnold, who was then in command at West Point, New York. Since the ship was driven off, André was forced to attempt travel by land onto the city of New York, when he was captured not far from the British lines near Tarrytown, NY. André mistook patriots for loyalists, and was caught with incriminating papers upon his possession and was tried and hanged as a spy, and Arnold, his plot now discovered, fled to the British lines. Such events occurred due to the efforts of Atherton, as an astute minuteman who proposed moving a suitable cannon to fire upon HMS Vulture.

=== Later years ===
He moved to Keyser Creek in 1782 and lived on a hill overlooking it. The area today is known as Taylor, Pennsylvania. The area today is known as Taylor, Pennsylvania.

He relocated one final time, returning to Afton, New York, in 1803, where he traded until his death 6 years later.

== Personal ==
He married Margaret “Mary” Delano (b. June 4, 1744); the daughter of Jonathan and Mary Delano in Dartmouth, Massachusetts, in 1760. Some sources incorrectly state that his first wife was from Tolland, CT. Their firstborn son was Jabez. They had 8 further children together.

Atherton chose to relocate numerous times, since his skills were in demand, relocating with his young family to Amenia, NY in 1763. However his uncle, James Atherton had moved further west, to what is now known as Wyoming, Pennsylvania. His uncle was one of the first settlers to arrive from Connecticut, and was likely to have been either a cousin or uncle. Some sources have incorrectly referred to James as being Atherton's father.

His sisters married his future business partners. His nephew was Cornelius Allerton.

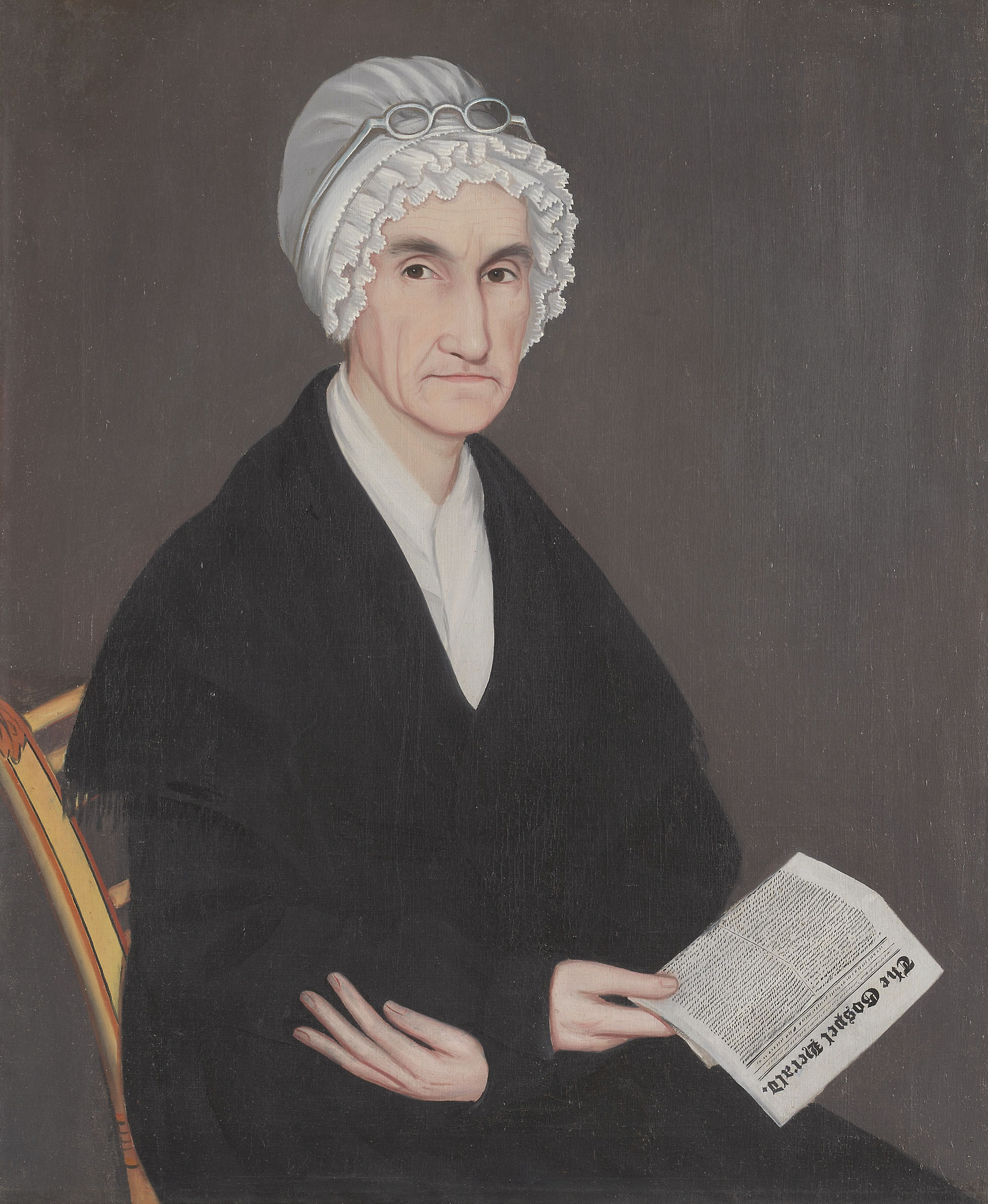
Lois Atherton, sister of Cornelius Atherton married Dr Reuben Allerton painted by Ammi Phillips; American artist (1788–1865)

He was widowed in 1786. Some sources incorrectly state that his first wife died in 1774. However she was alive when their oldest son Jebez was killed in the 1778, albeit very sickly. Atherton married Jane Johnson (1767-1848) during 1786. They had 7 children together.

He relocated to South Bainbridge, now known as Afton, New York, in 1803 with his second wife and young children.

He died on December 4, 1809, aged 73. He was buried at Vallonia Springs Cemetery in Colesville, New York. His wife Jane died on August 13, 1848, and was buried in the same cemetery, which is located in an isolated field.

== Descendants ==
From his first marriage:

- Jebez Atherton (1761-1778) born in NY. He was a Private in the Revolutionary War and was killed in the Battle of Wyoming, also known as the Wyoming Massacre, aged 16.
- John Daniel Atherton (1762-1841/ or 1845), married Mary Fulkerson of Six Mile Run, New Jersey. He had 12 children.
- Eleazer Augustus Atherton, Sr., born December 1764 in NY; married Martha Kinna of New Jersey. He had 7 children. He died March 3, 1852, in Taylor, PA.
- Elisha Atherton, born c. 1765. He married Martha Delaney.
- Mary (Polly) Atherton, born c. 1765 in PA; died c. 1829.
- Parthenia Atherton, born Bet. 1765 - 1771; died September 24, 1845.
- Prudence Atherton, born 1772. She married Raynesford Hoyt.

and 2 others that did not reach adulthood.

From his second marriage:

- Humphrey Atherton (1787-1849). Born in Luzerne, Pennsylvania, on July 20, 1787; he was a miller. He married and died without issue in Afton, NY on December 11, 1849, aged 62.
- Angelina Atherton Church (1791-1847). Born Jan 27th, 1791; died July 15, 1847. She married Col. Ira Church.
- Charles Atherton (1793-1869). Born in Luzerne on May 23, 1783. He was a blacksmith. He married Experience Bramhall, and relocated to Friendship, Allegany Co., where he worked at his trade several years, till the death of his wife, when he sold his property and went with a friend to Emporium, PA, where he died May 13, 1869, aged 76 without issue.
- Hiram Atherton (1796-1870). Born in Luzerne on Jun 16, 1796. He married Lovina Sisson, of Plymouth, and followed his trade of wagon-maker a few years in Afton, NY and subsequently for several years in Norwich, from whence he removed to Greene, and engaged in the cabinet business, which he pursued till his death, March 19, 1870, aged 73. They had five children.
- Christina Atherton Clapper (1799-1842). Born Jan 8, 1799; died January 24, 1842.
- William J. Atherton (1802-1879). Born May 25, 1802; died August 2, 1879, in Paterson, NJ. He was a shoemaker. He married Jane E. Hamlin and had two children, both of whom died in infancy. They relocated to Paterson, NJ, where he died on August 2, 1879, aged 77.
- Cornelius Atherton Jnr (1805-1881). Born in New York on December 7, 1805. He lived in Afton and died October 10, 1881. He was appointed as the first postmaster of Afton, New York in 1855. He was present at the Centenary of the Wyoming Massacre. He had one son, William Monroe Atherton (1855-1905) who was a telegraph operator on the Baltimore & Ohio R. R, and who died in Chicago but was buried in Indiana.

== See also ==
- Iron Act
- History of the iron and steel industry in the United States

== Biography ==
- Kemnitz, Katherine Three John Chamberlains and Cornelius Atherton ISBN 069278456X
- Oscar Jewel Harvey, The History of Wilkes-Barre and Wyoming Valley
- Smith, James H., History of Chenango and Madison Counties, New York . Published by D. Mason & Co. Syracuse, NY (1880)
