= Solar pond =

Solar thermal energy

Diagram of a solar pond

A solar pond is a pool of saltwater which collects and stores solar thermal energy. The saltwater naturally forms a vertical salinity gradient also known as a "halocline", in which low-salinity water floats on top of high-salinity water. The layers of salt solutions increase in concentration (and therefore density) with depth. Below a certain depth, the solution has a uniformly high salt concentration.

== Description ==
When the sun's rays contact the bottom of a shallow pool, they heat the water adjacent to the bottom. When water at the bottom of the pool is heated, it becomes less dense than the cooler water above it, and convection begins. Solar ponds heat water by impeding this convection. Salt is added to the water until the lower layers of water become completely saturated. High-salinity water at the bottom of the pond does not mix readily with the low-salinity water above it, so when the bottom layer of water is heated, convection occurs separately in the bottom and top layers, with only mild mixing between the two. This greatly reduces heat loss, and allows for the high-salinity water to get up to 90 °C while maintaining 30 °C low-salinity water. This hot, salty water can then be pumped away for use in electricity generation, through a turbine or as a source of thermal energy.

== Advantages and disadvantages ==
- The approach is particularly attractive for rural areas in developing countries. Very large area collectors can be set up for just the cost of the clay or plastic pond liner.
- The accumulating salt crystals have to be removed and can be a valuable by-product and a maintenance expense.
- No need for a separate collector.
- The extremely large thermal mass means power is generated night and day.
- Relatively low-temperature operation means solar energy conversion is typically less than 2%.
- Due to evaporation, non-saline water is constantly required to maintain salinity gradients.

== Efficiency ==
The energy obtained is in the form of low-grade heat of 70 to 80 °C compared to an assumed 20 °C ambient temperature. According to the second law of thermodynamics (see Carnot-cycle), the maximum theoretical efficiency of a cycle that uses heat from a high temperature reservoir at 80 °C and has a lower temperature of 20 °C is 1−(273+20)/(273+80)=17%. By comparison, a power plant's heat engine delivering high-grade heat at 800 °C would have a maximum theoretical limit of 73% for converting heat into useful work (and thus would be forced to divest as little as 27% in waste heat to the cold temperature reservoir at 20 °C). The low efficiency of solar ponds is usually justified with the argument that the 'collector', being just a plastic-lined pond, might potentially result in a large-scale system that is of lower overall levelised energy cost than a solar concentrating system.

== Development ==
Further research is aimed at addressing the problems, such as the development of membrane ponds. These use a thin permeable membrane to separate the layers without allowing salt to pass through.

== Examples ==
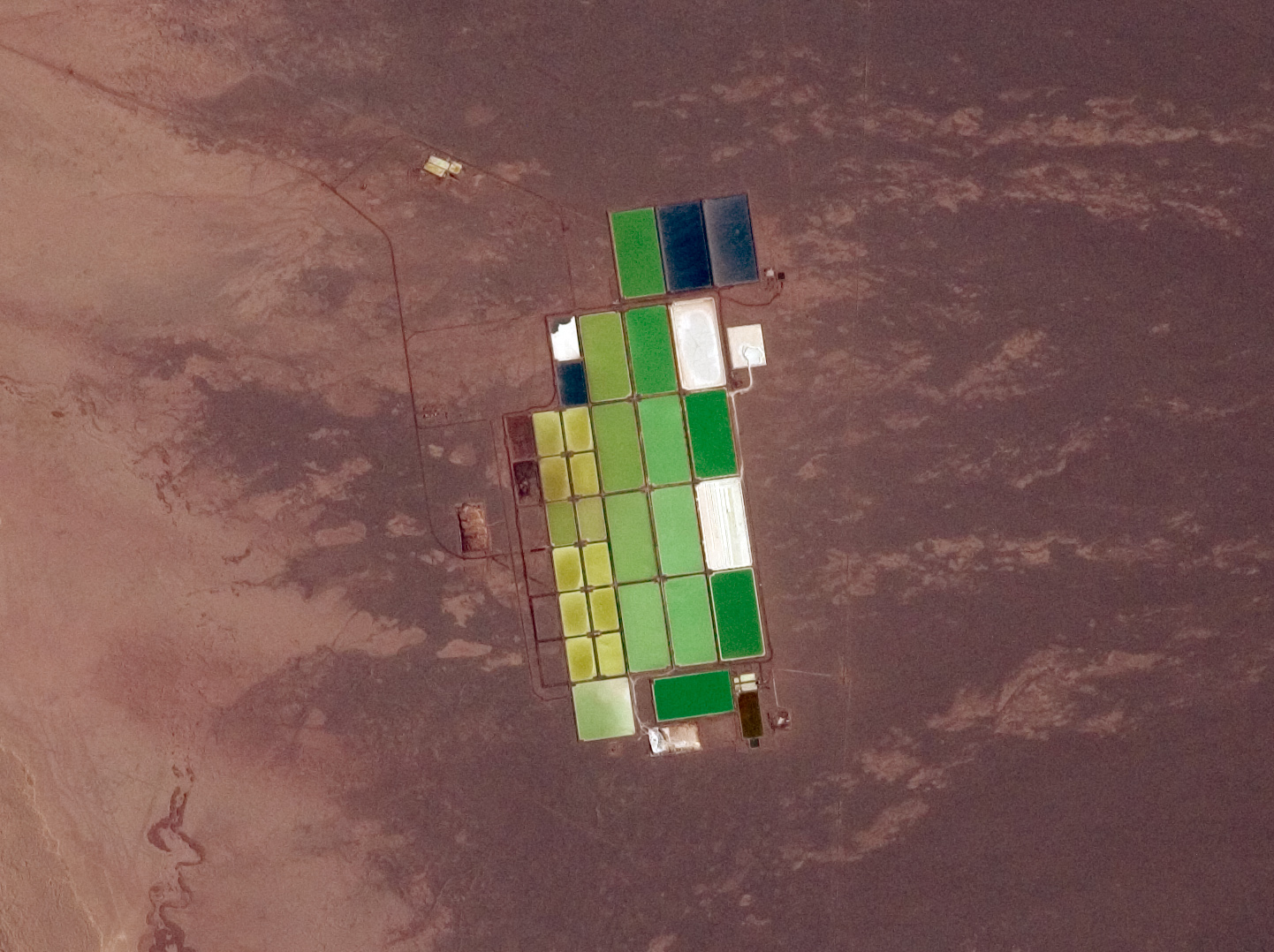
Solar Evaporation Ponds in the Atacama Desert

The largest operating solar pond for electricity generation was the Beit HaArava pond built in Israel and operated up until 1988. It had an area of 210,000 m^{2} (2,300,000 sq ft) and gave an electrical output of 5 MW.

India was the first Asian country to have established a solar pond in Bhuj, in Gujarat. The project was sanctioned under the National Solar Pond Programme by the Ministry of Non-Conventional Energy Sources in 1987 and completed in 1993 after a sustained collaborative effort by TERI, the Gujarat Energy Development Agency, and the GDDC (Gujarat Dairy Development Corporation Ltd). The solar pond successfully demonstrated the expediency of the technology by supplying 80,000 litres of hot water daily to the plant. It is designed to supply about 22,000,000 kWh of thermal energy annually. The Energy and Resources Institute provided all technical inputs and took up the complete execution of research, development, and demonstration. TERI operated and maintained this facility until 1996 before handing it over to the GDDC. The solar pond functioned effortlessly till the year 2000 when severe financial losses crippled GDDC. Subsequently, the Bhuj earthquake left the Kutch Dairy non-functional.

The 0.8-acre (3,200 m^{2}) solar pond powering 20% of Bruce Foods Corporation's operations in El Paso, Texas is the second largest in the U.S. It is also the first ever salt gradient solar pond in the U.S.

== See also ==
- Ocean thermal energy conversion
- Ice pond
- Seasonal thermal energy storage (STES)
- Thermal storage
- Deep lake water cooling
- Cooling pond
- Salt evaporation pond
