= Solar Collector (sculpture) =

Coordinates: 43.416746°N 80.387692°W

Solar Collector is an interactive light art installation in Cambridge, Ontario, Canada. It was commissioned by the Region of Waterloo and designed by Gorbet Design Inc. The sculpture consists of twelve aluminum shafts lined with solar panels and high-intensity LEDs. Each shaft is arranged to optimize its exposure to the sun at a particular time of year. The shortest, most acutely angled shaft is perpendicular to the sun at the Summer solstice (June 21) and the tallest shaft is perpendicular to the sun at the Winter solstice (December 21). Energy collected and stored during the day powers a nightly show. The general public interacts with the sculpture via its website where they design patterns and routines for the LEDs which are combined to create the nightly shows.

== See also ==
- Installation art
- Renewable energy sculpture
