= Central solar heating =

Solar architecture

Central solar heating is the provision of central heating and hot water from solar energy by a system in which the water is heated centrally by arrays of solar thermal collectors (central solar heating plants - CSHPs) and distributed through district heating pipe networks (or 'block heating' systems in the case of smaller installations).

For block systems, the solar collectors are typically mounted on the building roof tops. For district heating systems, the collectors may instead be installed on the ground.

Central solar heating can involve large-scale thermal storage, scaling from diurnal storage to seasonal thermal energy storage (STES). Thermal storage increase the solar fraction - the ratio between solar energy gain to the total energy demand in the system - for solar thermal systems. Ideally, the aim for applying seasonal storage is to store solar energy collected in the summer time to the winter month.

Compared to small solar heating systems (solar combisystems), central solar heating systems have better price-performance ratios due to the lower installation price, the higher thermal efficiency and less maintenance. In some countries such as Denmark large-scale solar district heating plants are financially fully competitive to other forms of heat generation.

Central solar systems can also be used for solar cooling in the form of district cooling. In this case, the overall efficiency is high due to the high correlation between the energy demand and the solar radiation.

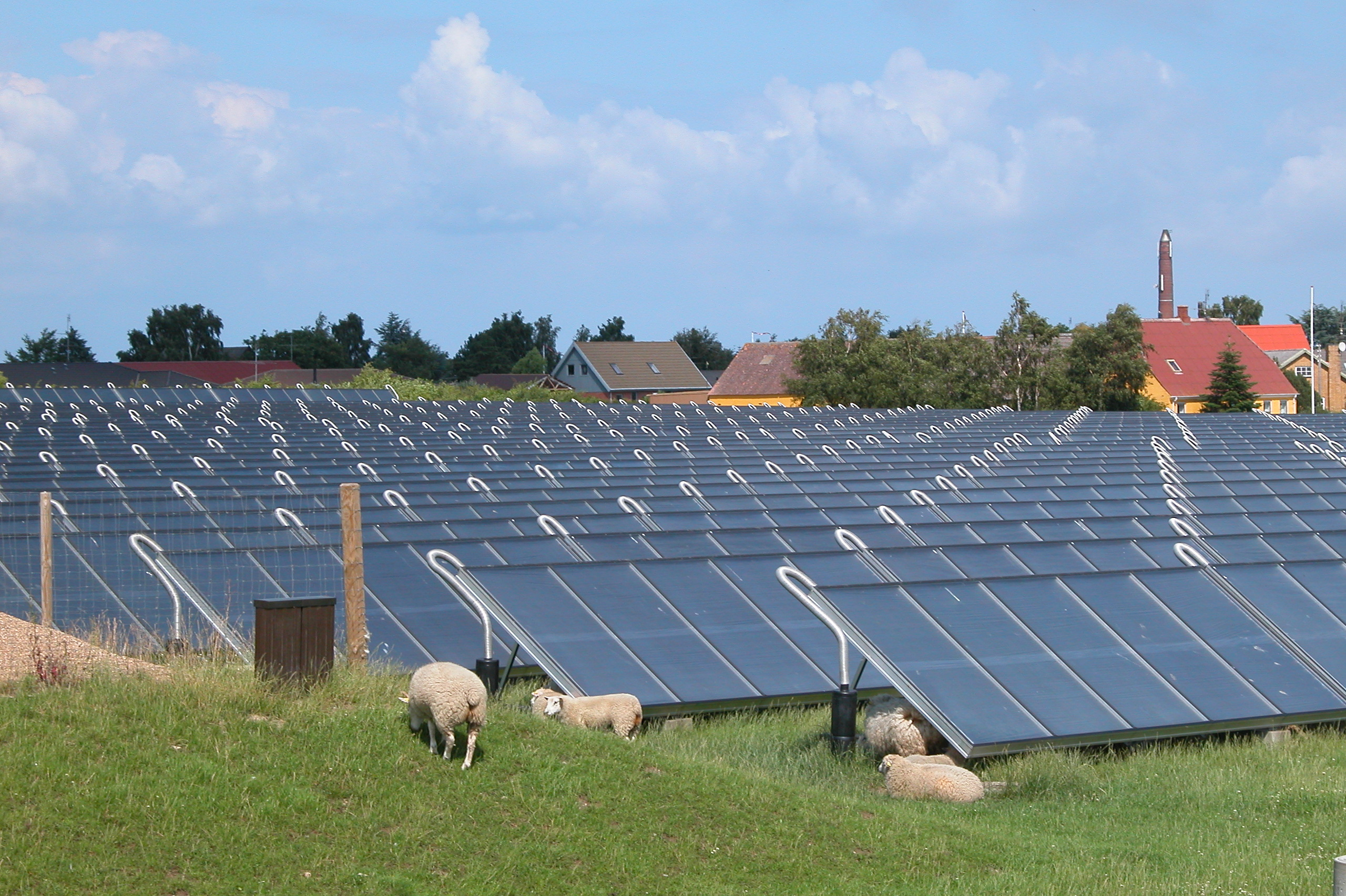
Marstal central solar heating, with an area of 18,365 m^{2}. It covers a third of Marstal's heat consumption.

== Largest CSHPs ==
Name	Country	Owner	Solar collector size	Thermal Power	Annual production	Installation year	Storage volume	Storage type Facilities	Collector manufacturer
			m^{2}	MW_{th}	GWh		m^{3}		
Silkeborg	DK	Silkeborg Fjernvarme	157,000	110	80	2016	64,000	Water tank	ARCON (DK)
Vojens	DK	Vojens Fjernvarme	70,000	50	35	2012–2015	203,000	Insulated water pond Water tank	ARCON (DK)
Port Augusta, South Australia	Australia	Sundrop Farms	51,500	36.4		2016			Aalborg CSP. Desalination for vegetables. 1.5 MW electricity
Gramm	DK	Gram Fjernvarme	44,801	31	20.8	2009-	122,000	Insulated water pond. 10MW electric boiler 900 kW heat pump	
Gabriela Mistral, El Loa, Atacama Desert	Chile	CODELCO mine	43,920	27–34	52–80	2013	4,300	Water tank	ARCON (DK). Supplies an electrowinning copper process
Dronninglund	DK		37,573	26	18	2014	60,000	Insulated water pond	ArCon (DK)
Zhongba, 4,700 metres altitude	Tibet (China)		34,650		20	2019	15,000	Water tank	ArCon
Marstal	DK	Marstal Fjernvarme	33,300	24	13.4	1996–2002, 2020	2,100; 3,500; 70,000	Water tank Sand/water ground pit Insulated water pond with new lid	Sunmark / ARCON (DK). Feeds 0.75 MW ORC turbine
Ringkøbing	DK		30,000	22.6	14	2010–2014			ArCon
Brønderslev	DK		27,000	16.6			8,000	Water tank	CSP parabolic trough
Langkazi, 4,600 metres altitude	Tibet (China)		22,000			2018	15,000	Insulated water pond	ArCon
Hjallerup	DK		21,432						
Vildbjerg	DK		21,234	14.5	9.5	2014			ArCon
Helsinge	DK	Helsinge Fjernvarme	19,588	14	9.4	2012-2014			
Hadsund	DK	Hadsund Fjernvarme	20,513	14	11.5	2015			ARCON (DK)
Nykøbing Sjælland	DK		20,084	14	9.5				ARCON (DK)
Gråsten	DK		19,024	13	9.7	2012			ARCON (DK)
Brædstrup	DK	Brædstrup Fjernvarme	18,612	14	8.9	2007/2012	5,000; 19,000	Water tank Borehole storage, insulated by seashells	ARCON (DK)
Tarm	DK		18,585	13.1	9	2013			ARCON (DK)
Jetsmark	DK		15,183	10.6	7.6	2015			Arcon/Sunmark (DK)
Oksbøl	DK		14,745	9.9	7.7	2010/2013			Sunmark (DK)
Jægerspris	DK		13,405	8.6	6	2010			Sunmark (DK)
SydLangeland	DK		12,500	7.5	7.5	2013			Sunmark (DK)
Grenaa	DK		12,096	8.4	5.8	2014			Arcon (DK)
SydFalster	DK		12,094	8.5	6	2011			Arcon (DK)
Hvidebæk	DK		12,038	8.6	5.7	2013			Arcon (DK)
Sæby	DK	Sæby Fjernvarme	11,866	8	6.3	2011			Sunmark (DK)
Toftlund	DK		11,000	7.4	5.4	2013			Sunmark (DK)
Kungälv	SE	Kungälv Energi AB	10,048	7.0	4.5	2000	1,000	Water tank	ARCON (DK)
Svebølle-Viskinge			10,000	5.3	5	2011/2014			
Karup	DK		8,063	5.4	3.7	2013			ARCON (DK)
Strandby	DK	Strandby Varmeværk	8,000	5.6	3.6	2007			ARCON (DK)
Nykvärn	SE	Telge Energi AB	7,500	5.3	3.4	1985	1,500	Water tank	Teknoterm (SE); ARCON (DK)
Crailsheim	DE		7,300			2012	37,500	Borehole	Wagner, Schüco, Aquasol, Asgard
Ærøskøbing	DK	Ærøskøping Fjernvarme	7,050	3.4	3	1998/2010	1,200	Water tank	ARCON/Sunmark (DK)
La Parreña mine	Mexico	Peñoles	6,270	4,4			660	Water tank	ARCON (DK). Supplies an electrowinning process
Falkenberg	SE	Falkenberg Energi AB	5,500	3.9	2.5	1989	1,100	Water tank	Teknoterm (SE); ARCON (DK)
Graz	AT	Energie Graz	6,000			2018		Water tank	
Neckarsulm	DE	Stadtwerke Neckarsulm	5,044	3.5	2.3	1997	25,000	Soil duct heat exchanger	Sonnenkraft (DE); ARCON (DK)
Ulsted	DK	Ulsted Fjernvarme	5,000	3.5	2.2	2006	1,000	Water tank	ARCON (DK)
Friederichshafen	DE	Technische Werke Fried.	4,250	3.0	1.9	1996	12,000	Concrete tank in ground	ARCON (DK)

Source: Jan Erik Nielsen, PlanEnergi, DK.

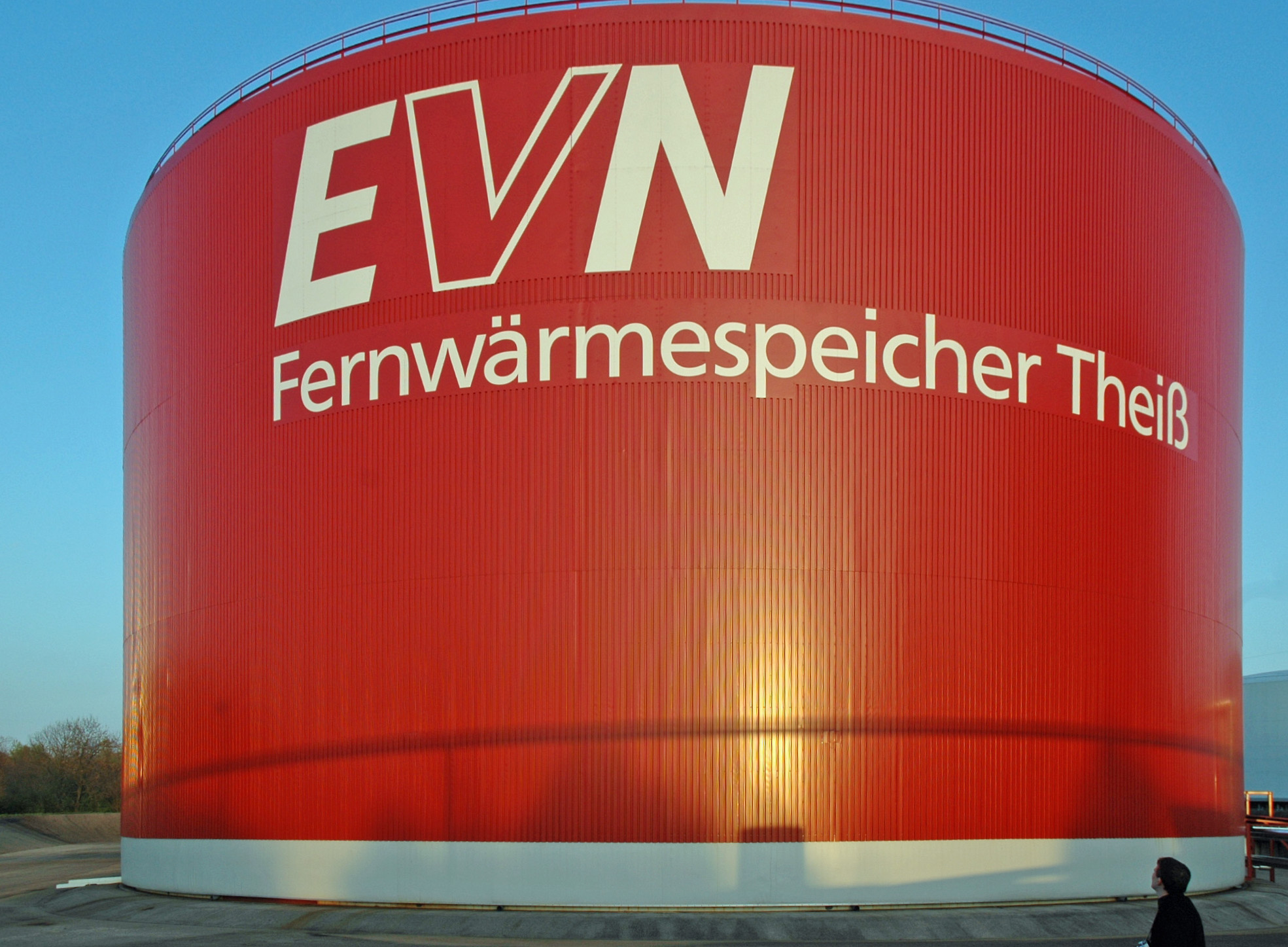
District heating accumulation tower at the Theiß power station near Krems an der Donau in Lower Austria with a thermal capacity of 2 GWh.

There is a plant in Rise (DK) with a new collector producer, Marstal VVS (DK), a plant in Ry (DK), one of the oldest in Europe, a plant in Hamburg and a number of plants below 3,000 m^{2}. The island of Ærø in Denmark has three of the major CSHP: Marstal, Ærøskøping, and Rise.

== History of central solar heating plants ==
The history of CSHP given here is mainly a Nordic-European perspective on the topic.

Sweden has played a major role in the development of large-scale solar heating. According to (Dalenbäck, J-O., 1993), the first steps were taken in the early seventies in Linköping, Sweden, followed by a mature revision in 1983 in Lyckebo, Sweden. Inspired by this work, Finland developed its first plant in Kerava, and the Netherlands built a first plant in Groningen. These plants are reported under the International Energy Agency by (Dalenbäck, J-O., 1990). Note that these plants did already combine CSHPs with large-scale thermal storage.

The first large-scale solar collector fields were made on-site in Torvalle, Sweden, 1982, 2000 m^{2} and Malung, Sweden, 640 m^{2}. Prefabricated collector arrays were introduced in Nykvarn, Sweden, 4000 m^{2} in 1985. There was from the beginning a strong international perspective and cooperation within this research field, through investigation with the European Communities (Dalenbäck, J-O., 1995) and the International Energy Agency (Dalenbäck, J-O., 1990). Denmark did enter this research area parallel to the Swedish activities with a plant in Vester Nebel in 1987, one plant in Saltum in 1988 and one in Ry in 1989, taking over the know-how for prefabricated solar collectors of large size by the Swedish company Teknoterm by the dominating company ARCON, Denmark. In the later 1990s Germany and Switzerland were active among others with plants in Stuttgart and Chemnitz.

Due to cheap land prices, in the Nordic countries new collector arrays are ground-mounted (concrete foundations or pile-driven steel) in suitable areas (low-yield agricultural, industry etc.). Countries with high ground prices tend to place solar collectors on building roofs, following the 'block plant' variant of CSHPs. In Northern Europe, 20% solar heat of annual heating requirement is the economic optimum in a district heating plant when using above-ground storage tanks. If pond storage is used, the solar contribution can reach 50%.

By 1999 40 CSHPs were in operation in Europe generating about 30 MW of thermal power.

== Related systems ==
Central solar heating is a sub-class of 'large-scale solar heating' systems - a term applied to systems with solar collector areas greater than 500 m^{2}.

Aquifers, boreholes and artificial ponds (costing €30/m^{3}) are used as heat storage (up to 90% efficient) in some central solar heating plants, which later extract the heat (similar to ground storage) via a large heat pump to supply district heating. Some of these are listed in the table above.

In Alberta, Canada the Drake Landing Solar Community has achieved a world record 97% annual solar fraction for heating needs, using solar-thermal panels on the garage roofs and thermal storage in a borehole cluster.

== See also ==
- District heating
- Solar heating
- Solar cooling
- Solar combisystem
- Solar thermal energy
- District cooling
- Renewable energy
