= Solar easement =

A solar easement is a right, expressed as an easement, restriction, covenant, or condition contained in any deed, contract, or other written instrument executed by or on behalf of any landowner for the purpose of assuring adequate access to direct sunlight for solar energy systems.

== Features ==
A typical solar easement establishes certain land use conditions agreed upon by the property owners involved. Such agreements will normally contain the following elements:

- A description of the dimensions of the easement, including vertical and horizontal angles measured in the degrees or the hours of the day, on specified dates, during which direct sunlight to a specified surface or structural design feature may not be obstructed;
- Restrictions placed upon vegetation, structures, and other objects which may impair or obstruct the passage of sunlight through the easement, and;
- The terms and conditions, if any, under which the easement may be revised or terminated, and what constitutes a violation of the agreement.

== Statutory recognition ==
Currently, there are 36 states in the United States that have provided for statutory protection for solar easements through the enactment of specific laws recognizing and protecting solar easements. California was one of the first states to enact such a law, beginning with their solar incentives as far back as 1976. Surprisingly, the State of Arizona does not currently have a solar easement statute.

== See also ==
- Solar power
- Solar hot water
- Easements
- Property rights
