= Drake Landing Solar Community =

Solar thermal energy

Coordinates: 50.73095°N 113.95029°W

The Drake Landing Solar Community (DLSC) was a planned community in Okotoks, Alberta, Canada, equipped with a central solar heating system and other energy efficient technologies. This heating system is the first of its kind in North America, although much larger systems have been built in northern Europe. The 52 homes (few variation of size and style, with average above-grade floor area of 145m^{2}) in the community are heated with a solar district heating system that is charged with heat originating from solar collectors on the garage roofs and is enabled for year-round heating by underground seasonal thermal energy storage (STES).

The system was designed to model a way of addressing global warming and the burning of fossil fuels. The solar energy is captured by 800 solar thermal collectors located on the roofs of all 52 houses' garages. It is billed as the first solar powered subdivision in North America, although its electricity and transportation needs are provided by conventional sources.

In 2012 the installation achieved a world record solar fraction of 97%; that is, providing that amount of the community's heating requirements with solar energy over a one-year time span.

In 2015–2016 season the installation achieved a solar fraction of 100%. This was achieved by the borehole thermal storage system (BTES) finally reaching high temperature after years of charging, as well as improving control methods, operating pumps at lower speed most of the time, reducing extra energy need as well as using weather forecasts to optimize transfer of heat between different storage tanks and loops. During some other years, auxiliary gas heaters are used for a small fraction of the year to provide heat to a district loop. The systems operate at coefficient of performance of 30.

After nearly 17 years of continuous monitoring (far exceeding the initial 4-year test period), performance analysis and improvements, a significant body of knowledge and experience has been learned about this type of system for Canadian applications.

In 2020, the system started showing signs of deterioration resulting in significant maintenance issues. System components, knowledge, and technical expertise for repairs were becoming increasingly challenging to find. In response to system failures, the Drake Landing Solar Company added redundancies to the system to be sure that homes in the community were receiving heat.

After a thorough investigation on available next steps, it was determined that the significant reinvestment required to have the system operate reliably, was simply something that neither the Drake Landing Solar Company board nor the collective community could afford.

In 2024, a decommissioning process for the Drake Landing Solar Community began, where the majority of the 52 homes were converted to natural gas-fired furnaces.

== How it works ==
There are 52 homes in this subdivision that contain an array of 800 solar thermal collectors (2293m^{2} total gross area). These solar collectors are arranged on the roofs of garages located behind the homes. During a typical summer day these collectors can generate 1.5 mega-watts of thermal power. A glycol solution (an anti-freeze solution; a mixture of water and non-toxic propylene glycol) is heated by the sun's energy and travels through insulated piping underground through a trench system to the heat exchanger within the community's Energy Centre. This is known as the Solar Collector Loop. The glycol solution then transfers its heat to water located in the short-term storage tanks. The District Heating Loop begins with water being heated in the heat exchanger to a temperature of 40-50 °C within the Energy Centre. This lower temperature is more energy efficient, as solar collecting is more compatible with lower temperatures. This increases the total amount of heat available to each home.

In the warmer months the previously heated water is taken from the short-term storage tank to the Borehole Thermal Energy Storage (BTES). The Borehole Thermal Energy Storage unit is 144 holes located 37 m (121 ft) below the ground and stretches over an approximate area of 35 m (115 ft) in diameter. The water returns to the short-term storage tanks in the Energy Centre to be heated again in order to complete the circuit. During colder months the water from the BTES passes back to the short-term storage tank and is then directed to each home. Similar to a hot water tank, the heated water goes through a heat exchanger that blows air across the warm fan coil. Heat travels from the water to the air and is directed through the house via ductwork. When the temperature reaches that said on the thermostat, an automatic valve shuts off the heat transfer unit.

== Energy centre ==
The Energy Centre building is a 232 square metre (2,500 square feet) building which began operation in 2007. It is located in very close proximity to all 52 homes that are using it. It is home to the short-term storage tanks and most mechanical equipment such as pumps, heat exchangers, and controls. The Solar Collector Loop, the District Heating Loop, and the Borehole Thermal Energy Storage Loop pass through the Energy Centre. Two horizontal water tanks occupy the majority of the space within the Energy Centre. These tanks are 12 ft (3.7 m) in diameter and 36 ft (11 m) in length. The remaining space within the Energy Centre houses pumps, valves, heat exchangers and other necessary equipment to operate and control the energy system. These tanks are known as Short-Term Thermal Storage (STTS).

The Energy Centre also have 22 kW PV installation to help with pumping equipment and powering sensors and other automation in the Energy Centre. There are no personnel on site, during normal operation, and it is monitored and controlled remotely and mostly in automated fashion.

== Borehole thermal energy system ==
The borehole thermal energy system (BTES) is located underground to store large quantities of heat collected in the summer to be used in the winter. It consists of 144 boreholes, which stretch to a depth of 37 m (121 ft). At the surface the pipes are joined in groups of six to connect to the Energy Centre. The entire BTES is covered by a layer of insulation, on top of which a park is built. When the heated water is to be stored, it is pumped through the pipe series. The heat transfers to the surrounding soil as the water cools and returns to the Energy Centre. When the homes need heat, water flows to the centre of the BTES field and picks up the heat from the surrounding soil. The heated water then goes to the short-term energy tank in the Energy Centre and is pumped through the District Heating Loop to the homes.

The BTES is in very close proximity to the Energy Center, and beyond pipes, also contains various temperature sensors. Construction started in 2005, and it was fully operational in 2007. It took about 4 years to fully charge with heat during summers, achieving maximum on 5th year.

== Sponsors and partners ==
This project was conceived by Natural Resources Canada’s CanmetENERGY in partnership with governmental organizations and Canadian industries. Of the $7 million needed for this project this was the breakdown of funds:

- $2 million from federal government agencies.
- $2.9 million from the Federation of Canadian Municipalities and Green Municipal Investment Fund.
- $625,000 from the Alberta Government.

== Community members ==
Homeowners were willing to pay for these energy efficient homes because it ensured high quality construction. Until the solar heating system began working, ATCO Gas (an Alberta-based natural gas distribution company) fixed heating costs at $60 per month for the homeowners at the Drake Landing Solar Community. With rising fuel costs, this was a powerful incentive for homeowners to support the DLSC project. Even if the project had failed, ATCO Gas would have replaced the special hot-water furnaces with traditional natural gas ones. There was limited risk to the homeowners and this encouraged them to support the project.

== Local sustainability ==
The 52 homes in Drake Landing Solar Community are certified to Natural Resource Canada's R-2000 Standard as well as the Built Green™ Alberta Gold Standard.

== Costs and financing ==
- Each house sold for an average of $380,000.
- Homeowners are receiving an average of $60 per month solar utility bill for heating.
- $7 million for the initial start up of the Drake Landing Solar Community project.
- If this project were repeated it would cost $4 million, as approximately $3 million was for one-time research and development.
- Optimal community size would be 200-300 homes to realize the economies of scale. The number of systems would remain the same; only the number of boreholes would need to increase.

== International effects ==
A group of researchers from South Korea visited Drake Landing Solar Community in April 2012 to study the geothermal heating technology and how it can be applied to communities in South Korea, particularly ahead of the 2018 Winter Olympics in Pyeongchang. The main focus of this research trip was to learn about the economics and reliability of the technology.

== Performance ==
On October 5, 2012, the DLSC set a new world record by covering 97% of space heating needs with solar thermal energy. In the 2015-2016 heating season, 100% of space heating needs were met with solar energy.

== See also ==
- List of energy storage projects
