= Ice pond =

Natural deposit of ice

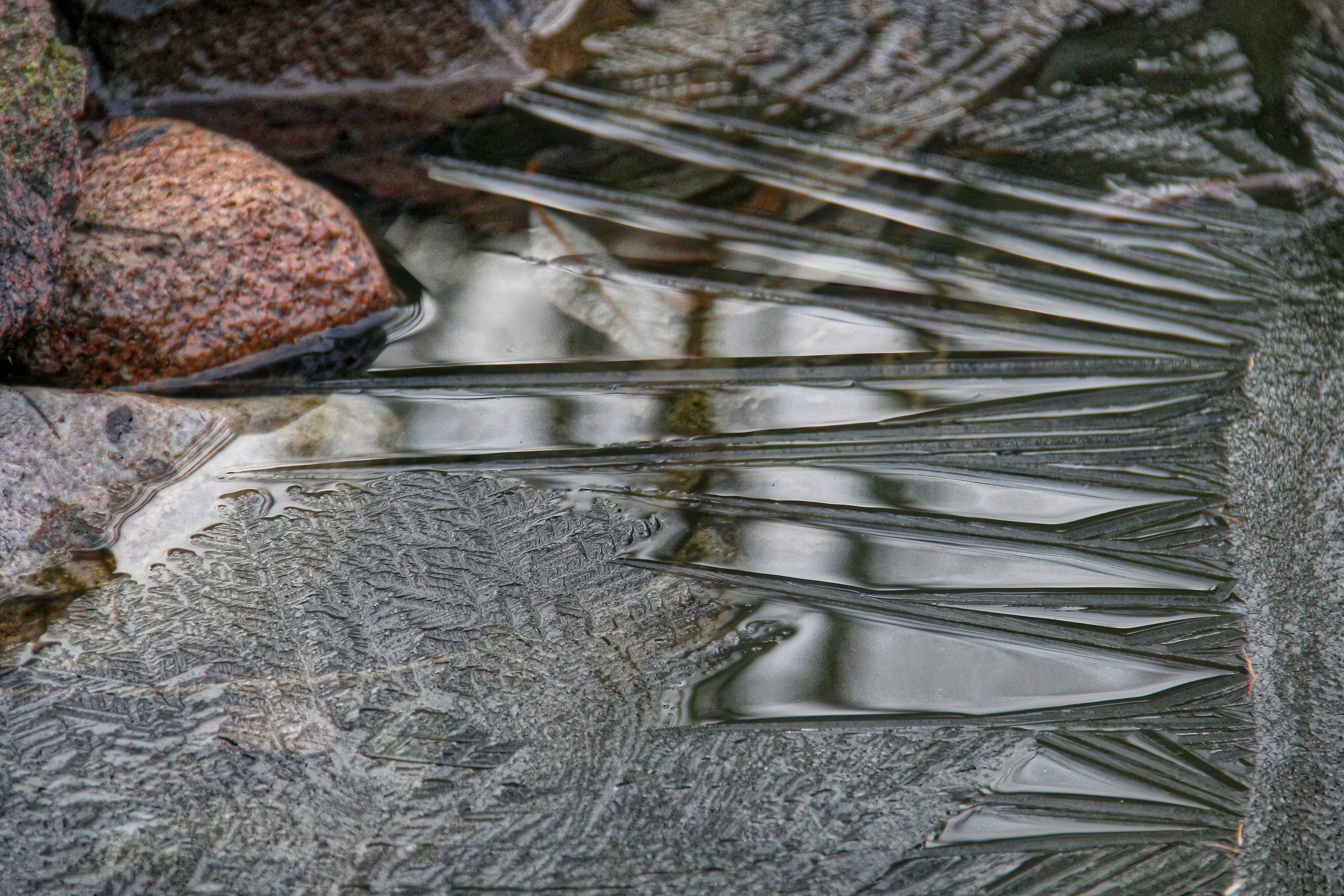
Ice forming on the edge of a pond.

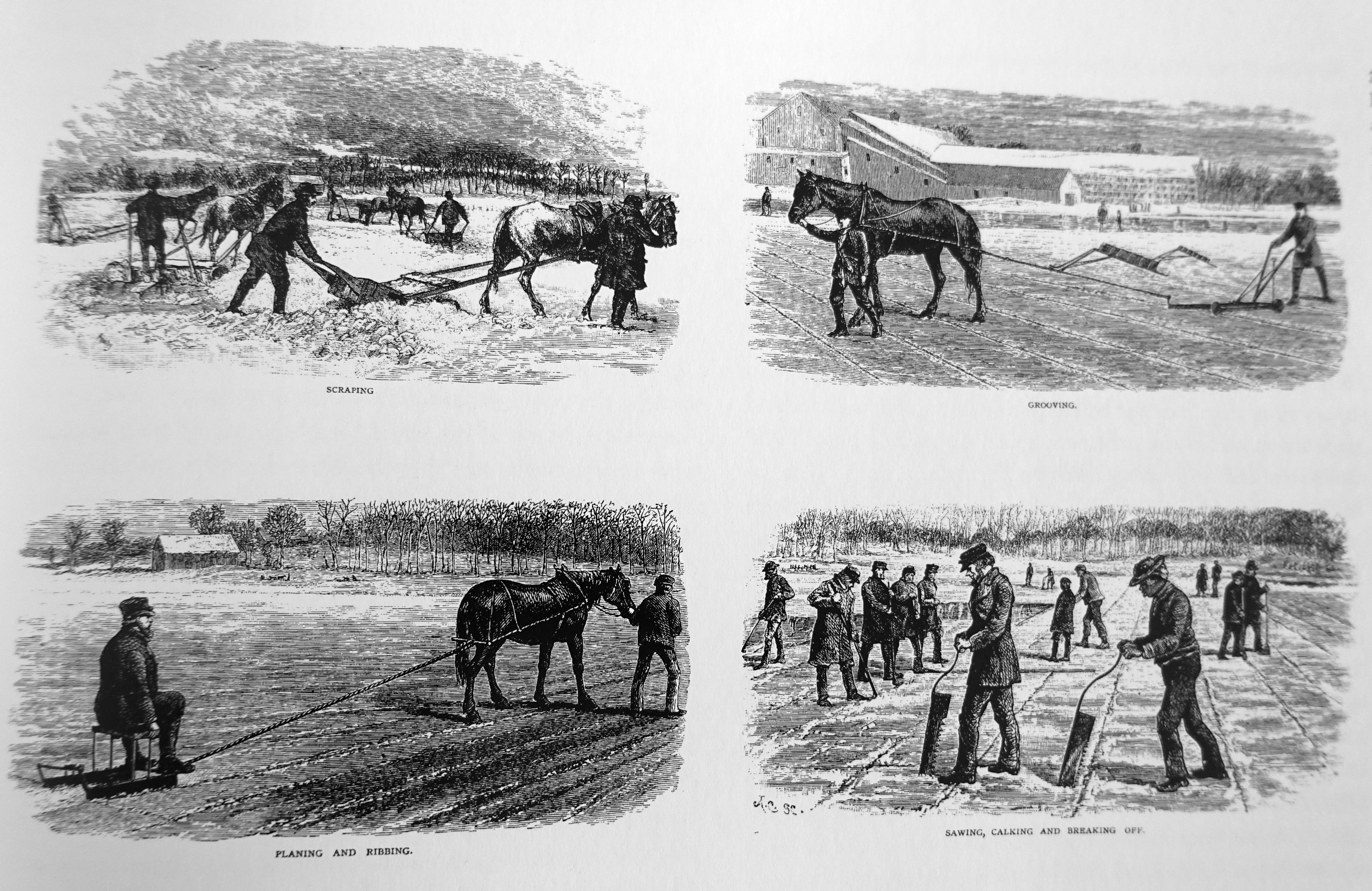
An illustration of ice cutting at Fresh Pond in the August 1875 issue of Scribner's Monthly.

An ice pond is a large volume of ice or snow produced by natural winter freezing. The ice is then used for cooling or air conditioning.

Before refrigeration was common, ice ponds were mined by ice companies, with product transported to consumers and food businesses through much of the year. Refrigeration technology replaced this technology.

In more recent times, ice ponds have been revived as an environmentally friendly way to air condition buildings in the summer. The best known experiment is the 'Princeton ice pond' by Ted Taylor in 1981. He then persuaded the Prudential Insurance Company to use a bigger pond to provide air conditioning for a larger building. Taylor also investigated the possibility of using the technology for water purification, which he demonstrated during a non-fiction segment on the 1984 educational series The Voyage of the Mimi.

== See also ==
- Ice house (building)
- Seasonal thermal energy storage (STES)
- Snowmaking
- Solar pond
