= Indosolar =

Indian solar-panel manufacturer

Indosolar Limited
- Formerly: Robin Garments Private Limited; Robin Solar Private Limited
- Type: Public
- Traded as: BSE: 533257; NSE: INDOSOLAR
- ISIN: INE866K01015
- Industry: Solar power
- Founded: 8 April 2005; 21 years ago
- Founder: Bhushan Kumar Gupta
- Headquarters: C-12, Friends Colony (East), New Delhi, Delhi, India
- Area served: Worldwide
- Key people: H.R. Gupta (MD)
- Products: Photovoltaic cells; Solar panels
- Production output: 450 MW (2015)
- Revenue: ▼₹318.4352 crore (US$33 million) (FY18)
- Operating income: ▼₹−98.7024 crore (US$−10 million) (FY18)
- Net income: ▼₹−162.8352 crore (US$−17 million) (FY18)
- Total assets: ▼₹743.7186 crore (US$78 million) (FY18)
- Total equity: ▼₹−456.5296 crore (US$−48 million) (FY18)
- Number of employees: 283 (31 March 2016)
- Website: www.indosolar.co.in

Indosolar Limited is an Indian photovoltaic cell and solar panel manufacturer. Following insolvency proceedings, it was acquired by Waaree Energies in 2022.

== History ==
Robin Garments Private Limited was incorporated under the Companies Act on 8 April 2005, by Indian entrepreneur Bhushan Kumar Gupta. Gupta had previously founded Phoenix Lamps Ltd., an automotive halogen lamp manufacturer. On 2 July 2008, shareholders decided to rename the company to Robin Solar Private Limited to reflect the company presence in the solar business. The Registrar of Companies (RoC) granted a new certificate of incorporation on 21 July 2008. On 16 September 2009, the Delhi High Court ordered the amalgamation of the two incorporated companies. Per the terms of the amalgamation, the company's status was changed from a private limited company to a public limited company, and it was renamed Indosolar Limited. The RoC granted new certificates of incorporation confirming the new status and name on 12 October and 30 October 2009 respectively.

On 13 June 2014, Indosolar secured a contract with Azure Power to supply 60 MW of solar power. This was the single largest solar contract of India's National Solar Mission.

== Insolvency and acquisition ==
After sustained financial losses, Indosolar was admitted to the corporate insolvency resolution process under the Insolvency and Bankruptcy Code, 2016. On 21 April 2022, the National Company Law Tribunal approved a resolution plan submitted by Waaree Energies to acquire the company, which raised Waaree's solar-cell manufacturing capacity to 5.4 GW.

== See also ==
- Azure Power
- Solar power in India
