= Ubiquitous Energy =

- Type: Private
- Founded: 2011; 15 years ago
- Founders: Miles Barr; Vladimir Bulović; Richard Lunt
- Headquarters: Redwood City, California, U.S.

Ubiquitous Energy is a transparent solar technology company headquartered in Redwood City, California, which is located within Silicon Valley. Ubiquitous Energy designs and develops transparent solar technology for windows, electronics, and other applications. The company’s transparent solar technology is branded as UE Power™.

== Technology ==
UE Power™ is a transparent coating that converts solar energy into electricity. This serves as an invisible, onboard source of electricity for windows and other products. UE Power™ transmits energy in the visible part of the solar spectrum, what humans see as light and color, while simultaneously absorbing and converting invisible ultraviolet and infrared energy into electricity. The company has various patents for its transparent solar technology, which it describes as truly transparent, allowing surfaces such as windows to convert ambient light into electricity without impacting aesthetics or performance. For architectural glass products, the company applies its technology as a low-E coating in insulated glass units.

== History ==
The company’s initial technology concept was invented in 2011 at MIT (Massachusetts Institute of Technology) by Ubiquitous Energy co-founders Miles Barr, Vladmir Bulovic, and Richard Lunt. A proof-of-concept solar device was demonstrated with selective absorption in the near-infrared and ultraviolet parts of the solar spectrum and selective transmission in the visible part of the solar spectrum. Aspects of the initial concept were published in Applied Physics Letters, and the company was founded in late 2011.

In 2012, Ubiquitous Energy used commercially available materials to develop its first transparent solar module prototypes. This work led to private investments and grant funding from the National Science Foundation.

In 2014, Ubiquitous Energy relocated from the Cambridge, MA area to Silicon Valley in the San Francisco Bay Area, where it commissioned a rapid prototyping R&D line. From this R&D line, the company later announced a certified world record performance for transparent solar cells and the first large area 1ft x 1ft transparent solar window prototype.

In 2018, the company announced partnerships with global glass manufacturers AGC and NSG. These partnerships supported the company’s development of transparent solar technology for target applications in commercial and residential window markets.

In 2019, the company commissioned a pilot manufacturing line which enabled the company to produce standard 14” x 20” test size windows and produce transparent solar windows at this size for various installation projects starting first with the company headquarters in 2020. Other installations now include projects at Michigan State University, Boulder Commons in Colorado, NSG’s North American R&D headquarters in Ohio and NSG’s facility in Tokyo, Japan.

In 2022 the company announced a partnership and strategic investment from Andersen Corporation to bring UE Power™ technology to residential windows and doors.

Ubiquitous Energy expects to have their first transparent solar window products being produced from a US manufacturing facility in the coming years.

== Funding ==
The company has raised over $70M in funding to date including funding from private investors and strategic investors (Aberdeen, Andersen Corporation, ENEOS, Hostplus, Red Cedar Ventures, Riverhorse Partners) and grants from the National Science Foundation and California Energy Commission.
