= Solar map =

A solar map, in general, is a map of a city, state, country, or any piece of land that illustrates information about how much a certain piece of land, building, or home experiences a certain amount of sunlight. Though solar maps are illustrated in many forms, a solar map essentially records where and to what extent a certain location experiences a certain amount of sunlight or radiation. It normally combines topographic, meteorological, and sometimes financial data to help scholars or consumers and investors in promoting awareness of the potential of solar power.

== Different Forms of Solar Maps ==
Solar maps come in a variety of different forms. The form in which they appear mostly depends on the background of the person studying the map.

=== Scholarly Solar maps ===
As the name implies, these maps are generally studied by scholars or people that come from an academic background. Solar maps in this form, for the most part, illustrate the extent to which a certain area experiences sunlight through the use of multiple shades and colors such as blue, green, yellow, red, and brown. These maps include quantitative data that shows specifically which regions of the map is experiencing certain specified amounts of solar energy or radiation from the sun. The regions(i.e. countries, towns, continents, cities etc.) that are illustrated in these solar maps may depend on the topic that the scholar studying. Normally, they are simple, and focused to prove a point that a scholar is making.

=== Interactive Solar Map ===
Unlike Scholarly Solar Maps, Interactive solar Maps are online and have a lot more detail and miscellaneous information. In most cases, these solar maps are constructed out of satellite images and allow internet users to zoom in and out of the map that they are viewing much in the way that Google Earth and Bing Aerial operates. In addition to this feature of these kinds of websites, the user is allowed to zoom in on a building, click on it, and receive data on the buildings solar potential, the amount of money that could be saved on the buildings electrical bills, the building's footprint, etc. On these websites of solar maps, there is the necessary amount of information so much that the internet user can reflect upon his own consumption and his own actions in deciding in pursuing cleaner and more eco-friendly alternatives of consuming electrical power.

== How a Solar Map is made ==
Making a solar map is a complicated process. It requires sophisticated instruments to measure certain environmental conditions and a big background in computer science in constructing solar maps.

=== Data Collection ===
First of all, the type of data collected in making a solar map varies to the type of solar map that is being made. There would be some types of solar maps that would include other types of information than others. As long as the information presented on the solar map pertains to information of measurements of Solar Energy or solar radiation the map can be considered a solar map.

==== Types of Data measured and collected ====
In order for a solar map to be made, two main types of data must be collected. Those two types of data include Meteorological Data and Topographical Data. The Meteorological data is used in calculations pertaining to Solar Energy. Such measurements of this type of data include the measurements of the position of the sun, overall atmospheric conditions, latitude, and shading. Topographical data on the other hand, is used in illustrating the amount of area exposed to a certain degree of radiation from the sun or in calculations that present how much area of a physical object is experiencing direct contact with the sun's rays. In some cases, Financial Data may also be collected to be presented on a solar map. When this happens, that means that the solar map would appear online for a certain city. The reasons why financial data is collected and presented on these solar maps is to encourage a certain productive behavior among citizens.

==== Technologies used ====
Some of the complex tools or instrument utilized in developing Solar Maps include LiDAR Technologies, the ESRI ArcGIS server, Solar Automated Feature Extraction (SAFE) technologies, and several others instruments. All these technologies are used in either collecting data, processing data, and even in developing the solar map itself.

== Roles of Solar Maps ==
According to policy makers in certain cities, a Solar Map serves multiple roles. According to government officials, solar maps help keep track of progress on sustainability goals for the city or town in which they live. If they prefer to establish a more eco-friendly environment, a solar map, in their minds, would be the right tool to use in measuring this goal. Another idea in why a local city government may want to provide a solar map online is to promote self-awareness of citizens own electrical consumption as well as to educate citizens of the possible rewards of using solar power instead of other conventional sources of power. By reflecting on the potential savings that a homeowner can earn, the thought goes, the idea of a high cost of installing solar power could be diminished. Thus encouraging homeowners to install photovoltaic panels.
