= Seasonal thermal energy storage =

Storage of heat or cold for periods of up to several months

Seasonal thermal energy storage (STES), also known as inter-seasonal thermal energy storage, is the storage of heat or cold for periods of up to several months. The thermal energy can be collected whenever it is available and be used whenever needed, such as in the opposing season. For example, heat from solar collectors or waste heat from air conditioning equipment can be gathered in hot months for space heating use when needed, including during winter months. Waste heat from industrial process can similarly be stored and be used much later or the natural cold of winter air can be stored for summertime air conditioning.

STES stores can serve district heating systems, as well as single buildings or complexes. Among seasonal storages used for heating, the design peak annual temperatures generally are in the range of 27 to 80 °C (81 to 180 °F), and the temperature difference occurring in the storage over the course of a year can be several tens of degrees. Some systems use a heat pump to help charge and discharge the storage during part or all of the cycle. For cooling applications, often only circulation pumps are used.

Examples for district heating include Drake Landing Solar Community where ground storage provided 97% of yearly consumption without heat pumps, and Danish pond storage with boosting.

== STES technologies ==
There are several types of STES technology, covering a range of applications from single small buildings to community district heating networks. Generally, efficiency increases and the specific construction cost decreases with size.

=== Underground thermal energy storage ===
UTES (underground thermal energy storage), in which the storage medium may be geological strata ranging from earth or sand to solid bedrock, or aquifers.
UTES technologies include:

- ATES (aquifer thermal energy storage). An ATES store is composed of a doublet, totaling two or more wells into a deep aquifer that is contained between impermeable geological layers above and below. One half of the doublet is for water extraction and the other half for reinjection, so the aquifer is kept in hydrological balance, with no net extraction. The heat (or cold) storage medium is the water and the substrate it occupies. Germany's Reichstag building has been both heated and cooled since 1999 with ATES stores, in two aquifers at different depths.
  In the Netherlands there are well over 1,000 ATES systems, which are now a standard construction option.
  A significant system has been operating at Richard Stockton College (New Jersey) for several years.ATES has a lower installation cost than borehole thermal energy storage (BTES) because usually fewer holes are drilled, but ATES has a higher operating cost. Also, ATES requires particular underground conditions to be feasible, including the presence of an aquifer.
- BTES (borehole thermal energy storage). BTES stores can be constructed wherever boreholes can be drilled, and are composed of one to hundreds of vertical boreholes, typically 155 mm (6.1 in) in diameter. Systems of all sizes have been built, including many quite large.
  The strata can be anything from sand to crystalline hardrock, and depending on engineering factors the depth can be from 50 to 300 metres (164 to 984 ft). Borehole thermal energy storage systems can lose heat to the surrounding ground during storage. Their performance is affected by factors such as groundwater movement, the thermal properties of the surrounding rock or sediment, and the geometry of the borehole array. Groundwater flowing through a storage area can carry heat away, while reducing heat loss through careful system design can improve thermal recovery. Spacings have ranged from 3 to 8 metres (9.8 to 26.2 ft). Thermal models can be used to predict seasonal temperature variation in the ground, including the establishment of a stable temperature regime which is achieved by matching the inputs and outputs of heat over one or more annual cycles. Warm-temperature seasonal heat stores can be created using borehole fields to store surplus heat captured in summer to actively raise the temperature of large thermal banks of soil so that heat can be extracted more easily (and more cheaply) in winter. Inter-seasonal Heat Transfer uses water circulating in pipes embedded in asphalt solar collectors to transfer heat to Thermal Banks created in borehole fields. A ground source heat pump is used in winter to extract the warmth from the Thermal Bank to provide space heating via underfloor heating. A high Coefficient of performance is obtained because the heat pump starts with a warm temperature of 25 °C (77 °F) from the thermal store, instead of a cold temperature of 10 °C (50 °F) from the ground. A BTES operating at Richard Stockton College since 1995 at a peak of about 29 °C (84.2 °F) consists of 400 boreholes 130 metres (427 ft) deep under a 3.5-acre (1.4 ha) parking lot. It has a heat loss of 2% over six months. The upper temperature limit for a BTES store is 85 °C (185 °F) due to characteristics of the PEX pipe used for BHEs, but most do not approach that limit. Boreholes can be either grout- or water-filled depending on geological conditions, and usually have a life expectancy in excess of 100 years. Both a BTES and its associated district heating system can be expanded incrementally after operation begins, as at Neckarsulm, Germany.
  BTES stores generally do not impair use of the land, and can exist under buildings, agricultural fields and parking lots. An example of one of the several kinds of STES illustrates well the capability of inter-seasonal heat storage. In Alberta, Canada, the homes of the Drake Landing Solar Community (in operation since 2007), get 97% of their year-round heat from a district heat system that is supplied by solar heat from solar-thermal panels on garage roofs. This feat – a world record – is enabled by inter-seasonal heat storage in a large mass of native rock that is under a central park. The thermal exchange occurs via a cluster of 144 boreholes, drilled 37 metres (121 ft) into the earth. Each borehole is 155 mm (6.1 in) in diameter and contains a simple heat exchanger made of small diameter plastic pipe, through which water is circulated. No heat pumps are involved.
- CTES (cavern or mine thermal energy storage). STES stores are possible in flooded mines, purpose-built chambers, or abandoned underground oil stores (e.g. those mined into crystalline hardrock in Norway), if they are close enough to a heat (or cold) source and market.
- Energy pilings. During construction of large buildings, BHE heat exchangers much like those used for BTES stores have been spiraled inside the cages of reinforcement bars for pilings, with concrete then poured in place. The pilings and surrounding strata then become the storage medium.
- GIITS (geo inter-seasonal insulated thermal storage). During construction of any building with a primary slab floor, an area approximately the footprint of the building to be heated, and > 1 m in depth, is insulated on all 6 sides typically with HDPE closed cell insulation. Pipes are used to transfer solar energy into the insulated area, as well as extracting heat as required on demand. If there is significant internal ground water flow, remedial actions are needed to prevent it.

=== Surface and above ground technologies ===
- Pit storage. Lined, shallow dug pits that are filled with gravel and water as the storage medium are used for STES in many Danish district heating systems. Storage pits are typically covered with an insulated floating lid to retain heat and prevent rainwater intrusion, after which they can sometimes be integrated into the surrounding landscape. A system in Marstal, Denmark, includes a pit storage supplied with heat from a field of solar-thermal panels. It is initially providing 20% of the year-round heat for the village and is being expanded to provide twice that. The world's largest pit store (200,000 m^{3} (7,000,000 cu ft)) was commissioned in Vojens, Denmark, in 2015, and allows solar heat to provide 50% of the annual energy for the world's largest solar-enabled district heating system. In these Danish systems, a capital expenditure per capacity unit between 0,4 and €0,6 /kWh could be achieved.
- Large-scale thermal storage with water. Large scale STES water storage tanks can be built above ground, insulated, and then covered with soil.
- Horizontal heat exchangers. For small installations, a heat exchanger of corrugated plastic pipe can be shallow-buried in a trench to create a STES.
- Earth-bermed buildings. Stores heat passively in surrounding soil.
- Salt hydrate technology. This technology achieves significantly higher storage densities than water-based heat storage. See Thermal energy storage: Salt hydrate technology

== Conferences and organizations ==
The International Energy Agency's Energy Conservation through Energy Storage (ECES) Programme has held triennial global energy conferences since 1981. The conferences originally focused exclusively on STES, but now that those technologies are mature other topics such as phase change materials (PCM) and electrical energy storage are also being covered. Since 1985 each conference has had "stock" (for storage) at the end of its name; e.g. EcoStock, ThermaStock. They are held at various locations around the world. Most recent were InnoStock 2012 (the 12th International Conference on Thermal Energy Storage) in Lleida, Spain and GreenStock 2015 in Beijing. EnerStock 2018 was held in April 2018 in Adana, Turkey, with over 220 participants from 24 countries.

The IEA-ECES programme continues the work of the earlier International Council for Thermal Energy Storage which from 1978 to 1990 had a quarterly newsletter and was initially sponsored by the U.S. Department of Energy. The newsletter was initially called ATES Newsletter, and after BTES became a feasible technology it was changed to STES Newsletter.

== Use of STES for small, passively heated buildings ==
Small passively heated buildings typically use the soil adjoining the building as a low-temperature seasonal heat store that in the annual cycle reaches a maximum temperature similar to average annual air temperature, with the temperature drawn down for heating in colder months. Such systems are a feature of building design, as some simple but significant differences from 'traditional' buildings are necessary. At a depth of about 20 feet (6 m) in the soil, the temperature is naturally stable within a year-round range, if the drawdown does not exceed the natural capacity for solar restoration of heat. Such storage systems operate within a narrow range of storage temperatures over the course of a year, as opposed to the other STES systems described above for which large annual temperature differences are intended.

Two basic passive solar building technologies were developed in the US during the 1970s and 1980s. They use direct heat conduction to and from thermally isolated, moisture-protected soil as a seasonal storage method for space heating, with direct conduction as the heat return mechanism. In one method, "passive annual heat storage" (PAHS), the building's windows and other exterior surfaces capture solar heat which is transferred by conduction through the floors, walls, and sometimes the roof, into adjoining thermally buffered soil. When the interior spaces are cooler than the storage medium, heat is conducted back to the living space.

The other method, “annualized geothermal solar” (AGS) uses a separate solar collector to capture heat. The collected heat is delivered to a storage device (soil, gravel bed or water tank) either passively by the convection of the heat transfer medium (e.g. air or water) or actively by pumping it. This method is usually implemented with a capacity designed for six months of heating.

A number of examples of the use of solar thermal storage from across the world include: Suffolk One a college in East Anglia, England, that uses a thermal collector of pipe buried in the bus turning area to collect solar energy that is then stored in 18 boreholes each 100 metres (330 ft) deep for use in winter heating. Drake Landing Solar Community in Canada uses solar thermal collectors on the garage roofs of 52 homes, which is then stored in an array of 35 metres (115 ft) deep boreholes. The ground can reach temperatures in excess of 70 °C which is then used to heat the houses passively. The scheme has been running successfully since 2007. In Brædstrup, Denmark, some 8,000 square metres (86,000 sq ft) of solar thermal collectors are used to collect some 4,000,000 kWh/year similarly stored in an array of 50 metres (160 ft) deep boreholes.

=== Liquid engineering ===
Architect Matyas Gutai obtained an EU grant to construct a house in Hungary which uses extensive water filled wall panels as heat collectors and reservoirs with underground heat storage water tanks. The design uses microprocessor control.

== Small buildings with internal STES water tanks ==
A number of homes and small apartment buildings have demonstrated combining a large internal water tank for heat storage with roof-mounted solar-thermal collectors. Storage temperatures of 90 °C (194 °F) are sufficient to supply both domestic hot water and space heating. The first such house was MIT Solar House #1, in 1939. An eight-unit apartment building in Oberburg, Switzerland was built in 1989, with three tanks storing a total of 118 m^{3} (4,167 cubic feet) that store more heat than the building requires. Since 2011, that design is now being replicated in new buildings.

In Berlin, the “Zero Heating Energy House”, was built in 1997 in as part of the IEA Task 13 low energy housing demonstration project. It stores water at temperatures up to 90 °C (194 °F) inside a 20 m^{3} (706 cubic feet) tank in the basement.

A similar example was built in Ireland in 2009, as a prototype. The solar seasonal store consists of a 23 m^{3} (812 cu ft) tank, filled with water, which was installed in the ground, heavily insulated all around, to store heat from evacuated solar tubes during the year. The system was installed as an experiment to heat the world's first standardized pre-fabricated passive house in Galway, Ireland. The aim was to find out if this heat would be sufficient to eliminate the need for any electricity in the already highly efficient home during the winter months.

Based on improvements in glazing the Zero heating buildings are now possible without seasonal energy storage.

== Use of STES in greenhouses ==
STES is also used extensively for the heating of greenhouses. ATES is the kind of storage commonly in use for this application. In summer, the greenhouse is cooled with ground water, pumped from the “cold well” in the aquifer. The water is heated in the process, and is returned to the “warm well” in the aquifer. When the greenhouse needs heat, such as to extend the growing season, water is withdrawn from the warm well, becomes chilled while serving its heating function, and is returned to the cold well. This is a very efficient system of free cooling, which uses only circulation pumps and no heat pumps.

== Annualized geo-solar ==
Annualized geo-solar (AGS) enables passive solar heating in even cold, foggy north temperate areas. It uses the ground under or around a building as thermal mass to heat and cool the building. After a designed, conductive thermal lag of 6 months the heat is returned to, or removed from, the inhabited spaces of the building. In hot climates, exposing the collector to the frigid night sky in winter can cool the building in summer.

The six-month thermal lag is provided by about three meters (ten feet) of dirt. A six-meter-wide (20 ft) buried skirt of insulation around the building keeps rain and snow melt out of the dirt, which is usually under the building. The dirt does radiant heating and cooling through the floor or walls. A thermal siphon moves the heat between the dirt and the solar collector. The solar collector may be a sheet-metal compartment in the roof, or a wide flat box on the side of a building or hill. The siphons may be made from plastic pipe and carry air. Using air prevents water leaks and water-caused corrosion. Plastic pipe doesn't corrode in damp earth, as metal ducts can.

AGS heating systems typically consist of:

- A very well-insulated, energy efficient, eco-friendly living space;
- Heat captured in the summer months from a sun-warmed sub-roof or attic space, a sunspace or greenhouse, a ground-based, flat-plate, thermosyphon collector, or other solar-heat collection device;
- Heat transported from the collection source into (typically) the earth mass under the living space (for storage), this mass surrounded by a sub-surface perimeter "cape" or "umbrella" providing both insulation from easy heat-loss back up to the outdoors air and a barrier against moisture migration through that heat-storage mass;
- A high-density floor whose thermal properties are designed to radiate heat back into the living space, but only after the proper sub-floor-insulation-regulated time-lag;
- A control-scheme or system which activates (often PV-powered) fans and dampers, when the warm-season air is sensed to be hotter in the collection area(s) than in the storage mass, or allows the heat to be moved into the storage-zone by passive convection (often using a solar chimney and thermally activated dampers.)

Usually it requires several years for the storage earth-mass to fully preheat from the local at-depth soil temperature (which varies widely by region and site-orientation) to an optimum Fall level at which it can provide up to 100% of the heating requirements of the living space through the winter. This technology continues to evolve, with a range of variations (including active-return devices) being explored. The listserve where this innovation is most often discussed is "Organic Architecture" at Yahoo.

This system is almost exclusively deployed in northern Europe. One system has been built at Drake Landing in North America. A more recent system is a Do-it-yourself energy-neutral home in progress in Collinsville, IL that will rely solely on Annualized Solar for conditioning.

== See also ==
- Central solar heating
- District heating
- Geosolar
- Ice house (building)
- Ice pond
- List of energy storage projects
- List of long-duration energy storage
- Solar pond
- Solar thermal collector
- Thermal energy storage
- Zero energy building
- Zero heating building
