= Taylor, Pennsylvania =

Borough in Pennsylvania, US

- Borough
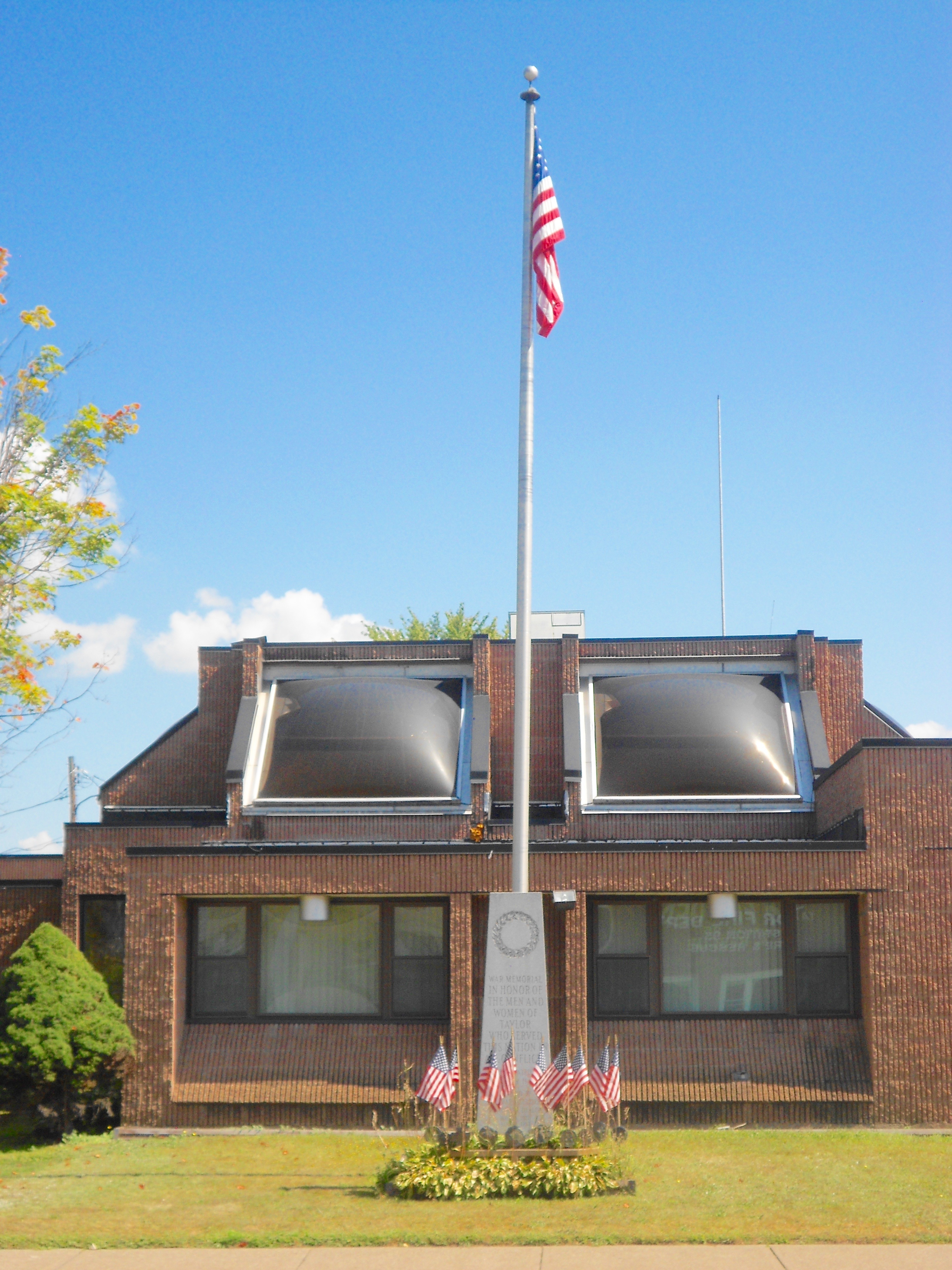
- Municipal building

- Location of Taylor in Lackawanna County, Pennsylvania

- Location in Pennsylvania Location in the United States
- Coordinates: 41°23′29″N 75°42′55″W
- Country: United States
- State: Pennsylvania
- County: Lackawanna
- Settled: 1790
- Incorporated: 1893
- Named for: Moses Taylor

Government
  - Mayor: Loni Kavulich

Area
  - Total: 5.20 sq mi (13.47 km^{2})
  - Land: 5.20 sq mi (13.47 km^{2})
  - Water: 0 sq mi (0.00 km^{2})
- Elevation: 856 ft (261 m)

Population (2020)
  - Total: 6,294 ▲
  - Estimate (2021): 6,282
  - Density: 1,136.7/sq mi (438.87/km^{2})
- Time zone: UTC-5 (EST)
  - Summer (DST): UTC-4 (EDT)
- ZIP code: 18517
- Area code: 570
- FIPS code: 42-76184
- Website: taylorborough.com

Taylor is a borough in Lackawanna County, Pennsylvania, United States, 3 miles (5 km) southwest of Scranton on the Lackawanna River. It was founded in 1790 by Cornelius Atherton. Silk manufacturing and coal mining were once practiced in the borough. Most of Taylor is built over abandoned mines. The Pennsylvania Turnpike Northeast Extension (I-476), accessible via the Keyser Avenue Interchange, passes through Taylor, going north to Clarks Summit and south to Philadelphia.

The population of Taylor at the 2020 census was 6,302.

== Geography ==
Taylor is located at 41°23′29″N 75°42′55″W (41.391279, -75.715354).

According to the United States Census Bureau, the borough has a total area of 5.2 square miles (13 km^{2}), all land.

== Demographics ==
Historical population
Census	Pop.	Note	%±
1900	4,215		—
1910	9,060		114.9%
1920	9,876		9.0%
1930	10,428		5.6%
1940	9,002		−13.7%
1950	7,176		−20.3%
1960	6,148		−14.3%
1970	6,977		13.5%
1980	7,246		3.9%
1990	6,941		−4.2%
2000	6,475		−6.7%
2010	6,263		−3.3%
2020	6,294		0.5%
2021 (est.)	6,282	▼	−0.2%

At the 2010 census there were 6,263 people, 2,631 households, and 1,650 families residing in the borough. The population density was 1,204.4 inhabitants per square mile (465.0/km^{2}). There were 2,791 housing units at an average density of 536.7 per square mile (207.2/km^{2}). The racial makeup of the borough was 94.5% White, 1% African American, 0.1% Native American, 0.6% Asian, 0.1% Pacific Islander, 2.4% from other races, and 1.3% from two or more races. Hispanic or Latino of any race were 5.3%.

There were 2,631 households, 24.8% had children under the age of 18 living with them, 43.6% were married couples living together, 13.8% had a female householder with no husband present, and 37.3% were non-families. 32.1% of households were made up of individuals, and 14.4% were one person aged 65 or older. The average household size was 2.33 and the average family size was 2.95.

In the borough the population was spread out, with 20.4% under the age of 18, 59.6% from 18 to 64, and 20% 65 or older. The median age was 44.6 years.

The median household income was $30,661 and the median family income was $43,611. Males had a median income of $30,238 versus $22,185 for females. The per capita income for the borough was $16,714. About 9.4% of families and 14.7% of the population were below the poverty line, including 28.2% of those under age 18 and 9.8% of those age 65 or over.

Riverside School District in Taylor serves the boroughs of Taylor and Moosic. The mascot of the school district is the Viking, and the school colors are red and blue. The school is fairly small and graduates approximately 100 students per year. The school is said to have a rivalry with Old Forge, the neighboring school.

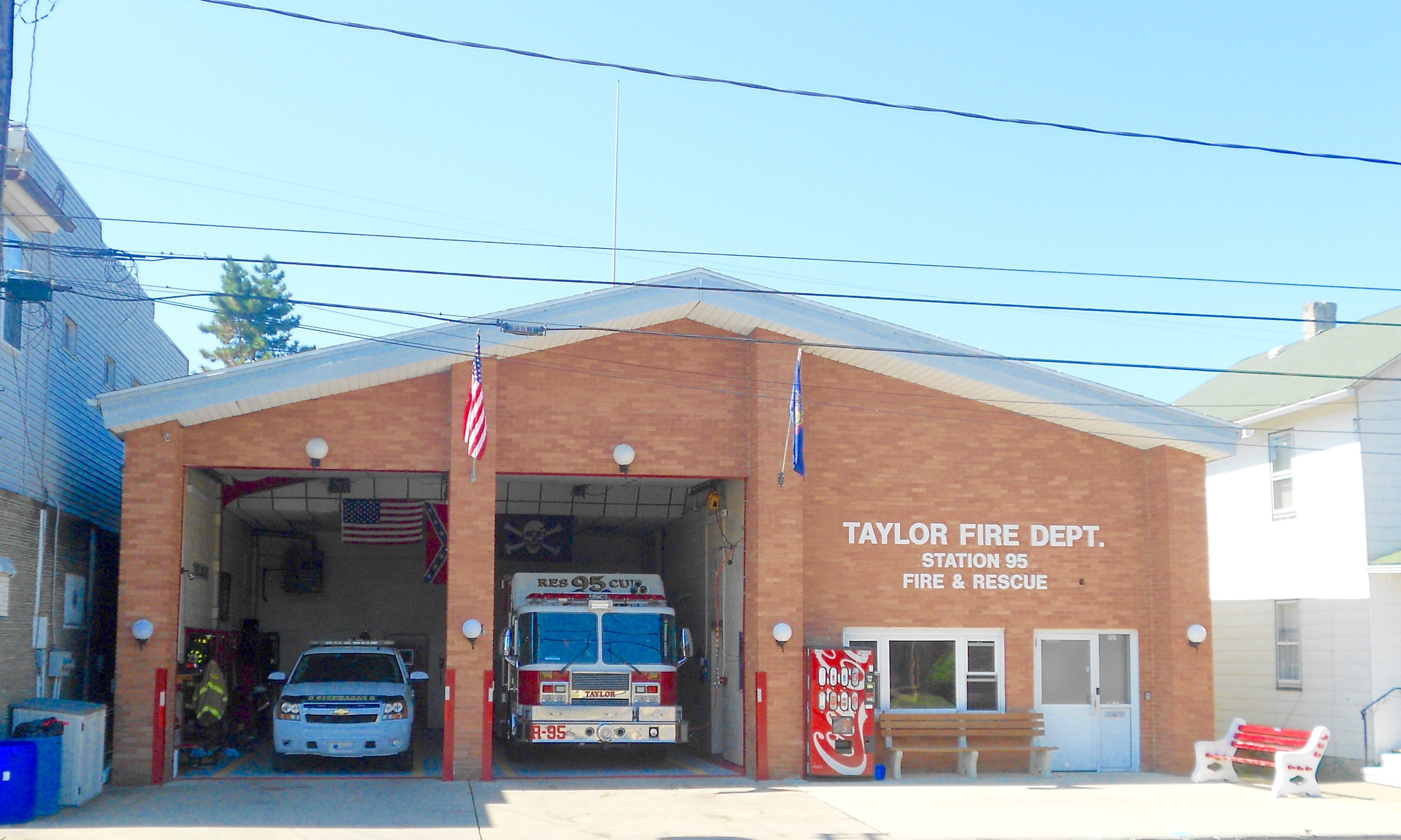
Fire station

== Notable person ==
- David P. Reese (1871–1935), member of the Pennsylvania House of Representatives
- Sid Michaels Kavulich (1956 - 2018), American politician, radio, and television broadcaster.
- Hannah Williams (1911 – 1973), American actress, singer, and comedian.
