= Solar savings fraction =

Solar power

In discussing solar energy, the solar savings fraction or solar fraction (f) is the amount of energy provided by the solar technology divided by the total energy required.

The solar savings fraction thus is zero for no solar energy utilization, to 1.0 for all energy provided by solar. The solar savings fraction of a particular system is dependent on many factors such as the load, the collection and storage sizes, the operation, and the climate. As an example, the same solar-thermal water heating system installed in a single-family house in Arizona might have f=0.75 (75%), while in a much colder and cloudier climate, like Pittsburgh, PA, might only have a solar fraction of f=0.3 (30%) or so. Great care is thus needed in designing such systems, and in evaluating their economics.

To increase the solar savings fraction, energy conservation measures should be employed first before expanding the size of the solar energy collection system. Doing so reduces the need for hot water or space heating, for example, and typically provides the best economic return on the total investment, including the solar energy system.

== See also ==
- Active solar
- Passive solar
  - Passive solar building design
- Solar power
- Renewable energy
- Autonomous building
- Architectural engineering
