= List of solar-powered products =

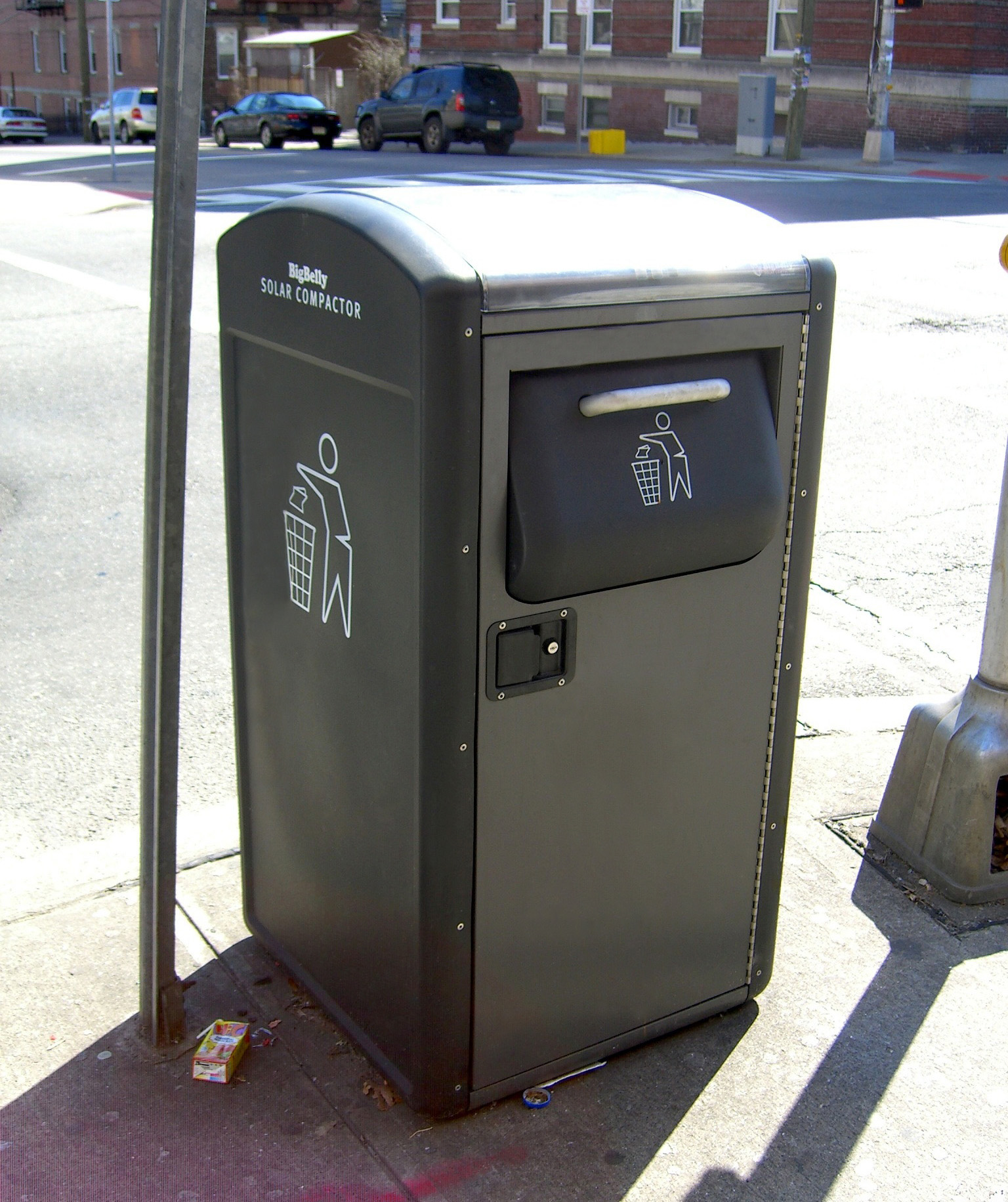
Solar compacting trashcan

Solar-powered fountain in a bird bath under shade versus direct sunlight

The following is a list of products powered by sunlight, either directly or through electricity generated by solar panels.

- Solar air conditioning
- Solar charger
  - Strawberry Tree
- Solar chimney
- Solar cooker
- Solar dryer
- Solar furnace
- Solar inverter
- Solar keyboard
- Solar lamp
- Solar pond
- Solar-powered calculator
- Solar-powered desalination unit
- Solar-powered flashlight
- Solar-powered pump
- Solar-powered radio
- Solar-powered refrigerator
- Solar-powered Stirling engine
- Solar-powered waste compacting bin
- Solar-powered watch
- Solar-pumped laser
- Solar road stud
- Solar roadway
- Solar lighter
- Solar still
- Solar street light
- Solar traffic light
- Solar Tuki
- Solar vehicle
  - Solar balloon
  - Solar boat
    - Tûranor PlanetSolar
  - Solar bus
  - Solar car
    - Stella (solar vehicles)
  - Solar golf cart
  - Solar panels on spacecraft
  - Solar sail
  - Solar thermal rocket

== See also ==
- Building-integrated photovoltaics
- Concentrated solar power
- List of photovoltaic power stations
- List of pioneering solar buildings
- List of solar thermal power stations
- Photovoltaic power station
- Photovoltaic system
- Rooftop solar power
- Smart glass
- Solar inverter
- Solar power
- Solar shingle
- Solar thermal energy
- Solar tracker
- Solar water disinfection
- Solar water heater
