= Debunker =

Person or group discrediting false claims

A debunker is a person or organization that exposes or discredits claims believed to be false, exaggerated, or pretentious. The term is often associated with skeptical investigation of controversial topics such as UFOs, claimed paranormal phenomena, cryptids, conspiracy theories, alternative medicine, religion, and exploratory or fringe areas of scientific or pseudoscientific research. According to the Merriam-Webster online dictionary, "debunk" is defined as: "to expose the sham or falseness of." The New Oxford American Dictionary defines "debunk" as "expose the falseness or hollowness of (a myth, idea, or belief)". If debunkers are not careful, their communications may backfire – increasing an audience's long-term belief in myths. Backfire effects can occur if a message spends too much time on the negative case, if it is too complex, or if the message is threatening.

== Etymology ==
The American Heritage Dictionary traces the passage of the words bunk (noun), debunk (verb), and debunker (noun) into American English in 1923 as a belated outgrowth of bunkum. The first recorded use of the words was in 1828, apparently related to a poorly received "speech for Buncombe County, North Carolina" given by North Carolina representative Felix Walker during the 16th United States Congress (1819–1821). The term "debunkery" is not limited to arguments about scientific validity; it is also used in a more general sense at attempts to discredit any opposing point of view, such as that of a political opponent. The term "debunk" originated as a neologism in the 1923 novel Bunk by American journalist and popular historian W. E. Woodward (1874–1950), who used it to mean to "take the bunk out of things".

== Notable debunkers ==
=== Ancient ===
- Cicero debunked divination in his philosophical treatise De Divinatione in 44 BCE.
- Sextus Empiricus debunked the claims of astrologers and dogmatic philosophers (c. 160 CE)
- Lucian wrote a book named Alexander the False Prophet against mystic and oracle Alexander of Abonoteichus (c. 105 – c. 170 CE) who led the Glycon cult then widely popular in the Roman Empire. He described Alexander's alleged miracles as tricks, including the appearance of the god Glycon being an elaborate puppet. Lucian also describes him as using thuggery against critics to silence them, including himself.

=== Modern ===
- Mick West operates the website Metabunk, where he investigates and debunks conspiracy theories, and has contributed multiple articles to Skeptical Inquirer.
- Stephen Barrett founded Quackwatch and writes on medical quackery.
- Adam Conover hosted the television series Adam Ruins Everything which debunks several misconceptions.
- Dorothy Dietrich is a professional magician and Houdini expert and historian. Has been put in charge of Houdini's grave site and is the founder of The Houdini Museum in Scranton, Pennsylvania.
- Brian Dunning produces the podcast Skeptoid.
- Stanton Friedman has debunked both supposed UFO cases and debunking attempts on other UFO cases.
- Martin Gardner was a mathematics and science writer who extensively debunked parapsychology in his magazine articles and books.
- Susan Gerbic is the founder and leader of Guerrilla Skepticism on Wikipedia which has the mission of improving the skeptical content of Wikipedia. She has focused her skeptical activism at debunking celebrity "psychics" such as Sylvia Brown, Chip Coffey, Tyler Henry and Thomas John.
- Britt Marie Hermes is a prominent debunker of naturopathy having once practised as a naturopath.
- Harry Houdini debunked spiritualists.
- Ray Hyman is a psychologist who is known for debunking some parapsychological studies.
- Philip Klass was a pioneer in the field of skeptical investigation of UFOs.
- Phil Mason is a scientist and YouTuber with the online pseudonym "Thunderf00t" (also "VoiceofThunder"), who debunks various snake-oil merchants and fundraiser campaigns for certain products, using basic scientific understanding, e.g. the laws of thermodynamics, to show that the advertised things simply make no sense and cannot deliver what is promised. He is known for criticising religion, pseudoscience, creationism, Hyperloop, Solar Roadways, etc.
- Alan Melikdjanian (Captain Disillusion) is a debunker of viral videos and hoaxes on the Internet, usually deconstructing them and explaining the post-production techniques and software used to create the illusions.
- Donald Menzel was Philip Klass's predecessor in debunking UFOs.
- Joe Nickell wrote regularly for the Skeptical Inquirer.
- Penn & Teller are an entertainment team who often demystify magic tricks and illusions. They have also debunked many other aspects of popular belief on their show, Penn & Teller: Bullshit!.
- Phil Plait is an astronomer and science writer whose speciality is fighting pseudoscience related to space and astronomy. He established Badastronomy.com to counter public misconceptions about astronomy and space science, providing critical analysis of pseudoscientific theories related to these subjects.
- Basava Premanand founded Indian CSICOP and the Federation of Indian Rationalist Associations, has exposed various Indian "god-men" (fakirs, sadhus, swamis, gurus, faith healers) and was known for being the most fierce critic of Sathya Sai Baba and his frauds.
- James Randi has exposed faith healers, "psychics" and others claiming to have paranormal powers.
- Benjamin Radford is an American writer, investigator, and skeptic who has authored, coauthored or contributed to over twenty books and written over a thousand articles and columns debunking topics such as urban legends, unexplained mysteries and the paranormal.
- Carl Sagan was a noted astronomer who debunked purported close encounters such as the Betty and Barney Hill abduction, and pseudoscience such as Immanuel Velikovsky's Worlds in Collision.
- Richard Saunders is prior president of Australian Skeptics, host of the Skeptic Zone podcast, a science activist, and is a Committee for Skeptical Inquiry Fellow.
- Michael Shermer is executive director and founder of the non-profit organization The Skeptics Society, and editor-in-chief of the group's magazine, Skeptic.

== Notable organizations ==
- American Council on Science and Health
- Committee for Skeptical Inquiry
- James Randi Educational Foundation
- The MythBusters, a program on the Discovery Channel. Two former special effects technicians, Jamie Hyneman and Adam Savage, test the validity of urban legends.
- The National Institute of Standards and Technology debunked the World Trade Center controlled demolition conspiracy theories.
- Popular Mechanics has released several publications also debunking 9/11 conspiracy theories, in particular those mentioned in Loose Change.
- Quackwatch
- The Robertson Panel, a CIA-convened scientific panel that recommended using mass media to debunk UFO reports and reduce public interest in flying saucers.
- The Skeptics Society
- Snopes debunks or validates urban legends.

== Backfire effects ==
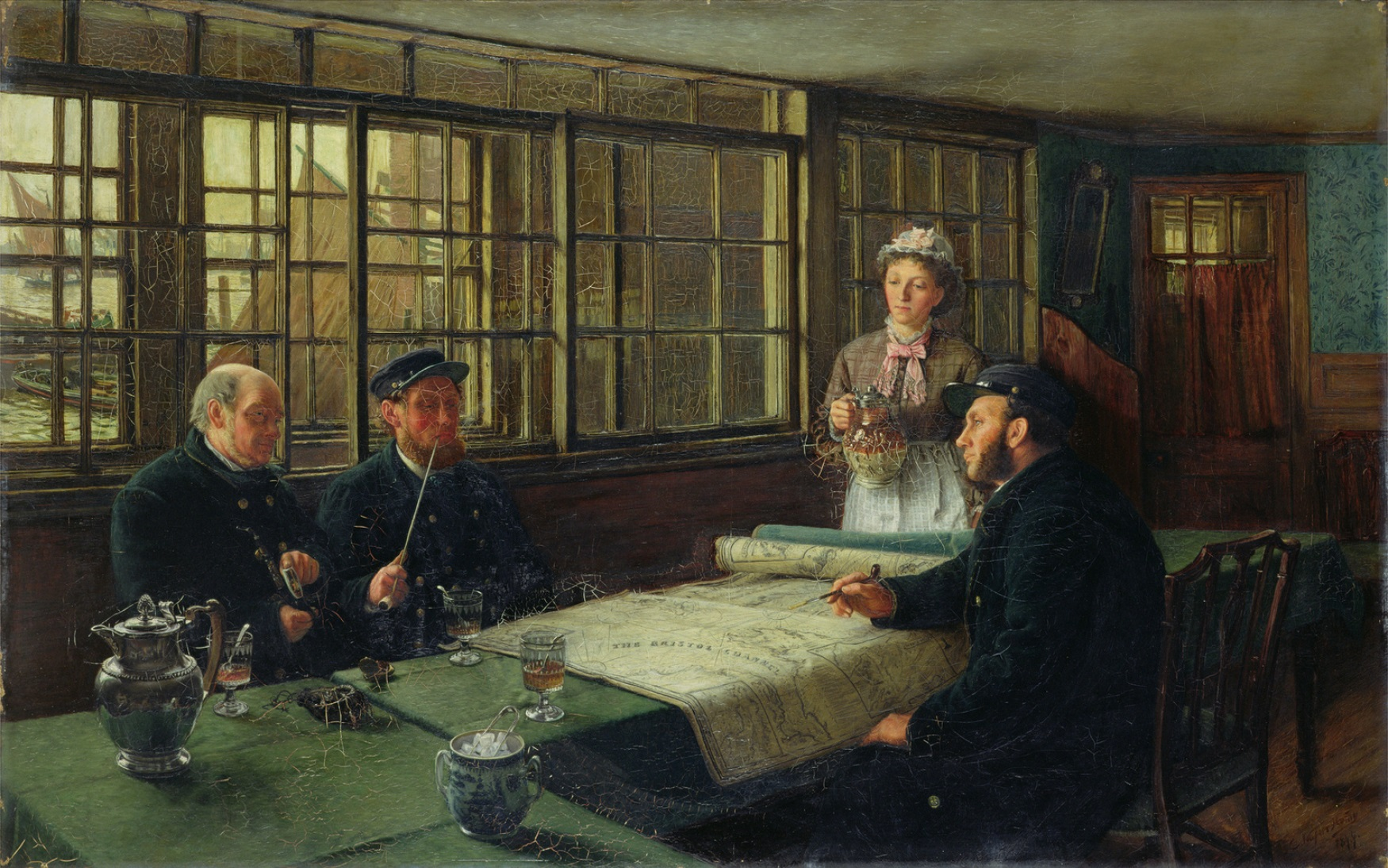
The authors of the Debunking Handbook warn that a failed debunking can actually worsen misconceptions. They recommend simple, positive, and emotionally sensitive education (e.g., bolstering the learner's ego, or avoiding threatening words).

Australian Professorial Fellow Stephan Lewandowsky and John Cook, Climate Communication Fellow for the Global Change Institute at the University of Queensland and author at Skeptical Science, co-wrote Debunking Handbook, in which they warn that debunking efforts may backfire. Backfire effects occur when science communicators accidentally reinforce false beliefs by trying to correct them, a phenomenon known as belief perseverance.

Cook and Lewandowsky offer possible solutions to the backfire effects as described in different psychological studies. They recommend spending little or no time describing misconceptions because people cannot help but remember ideas that they have heard before. They write: "Your goal is to increase people's familiarity with the facts." They recommend providing fewer and clearer arguments, considering that more people recall a message when it is simpler and easier to read. "Less is more" is especially important because scientific truths can get overwhelmingly detailed; pictures, graphs, and memorable taglines all help keep things simple.

The authors write that debunkers should try to build up people's egos in some way before confronting false beliefs because it is difficult to consider ideas that threaten one's worldview (i.e., threatening ideas cause cognitive dissonance). It is also advisable to avoid words with negative connotations. The authors describe studies which have shown that people abhor incomplete explanations – they write "In the absence of a better explanation, [people] opt for the wrong explanation". It is important to fill conceptual gaps and explain the cause of the misconception in the first place. The authors believe these techniques can reduce the odds of a "backfire" – that an attempt to debunk bad science will increase the audience's belief in misconceptions. The Debunking Handbook (2020) explains that "backfire effects occur only occasionally and the risk of occurrence is lower in most situations than once thought". The authors recommend "not refrain from attempting to debunk or correct misinformation out of fear that doing so will backfire or increase beliefs in false information".

== See also ==
- List of scientific skeptics
- The True Believer
