= Solar road stud =

LED road marking

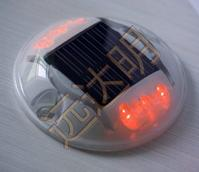
Solar road stud

Solar road studs are flashing solar cell powered LED low-maintenance lighting devices that delineate road edges and centrelines. Embedded in the road surface, they are an electronic improvement on the traditional cat's eyes and raised pavement marker in that they may give drivers a larger reaction window.

Averaging about 100 mm square or 100 mm diameter and about 40 mm thick, units are extremely robust to avoid damage by passing vehicles, and are normally constructed of engineering plastics and polycarbonates. Use of solar road studs reduces the necessity of headlight main beams and the accompanying hazard of dazzling oncoming drivers. They are also more visible in rain and fog conditions where the old type retroreflectors and road markings are problematic. The solar cells charge batteries or capacitors during sunlit hours, over which period the flashing LEDs are turned off by a photodetector.

== Uses ==
Some examples of uses are listed:

- Ground lights to warn traffic of an upcoming road hazard or road work.
- Improving road illumination in general within the city at night.
- Improving road illumination on winding hazardous back roads at night.
- Improving road illumination at industrial or shipping sites.
- Remote airstrip runway lighting.
- Lighting for outdoor mining operations.
- Adding or improving illumination on farms for animal or equipment.
- At home outdoor décor.

== See also ==
- Solar Roadways
- Smart highways
- Cat's eye (road)
- Raised pavement marker
