= Solar lamp =

Lamp powered by one or more solar panels

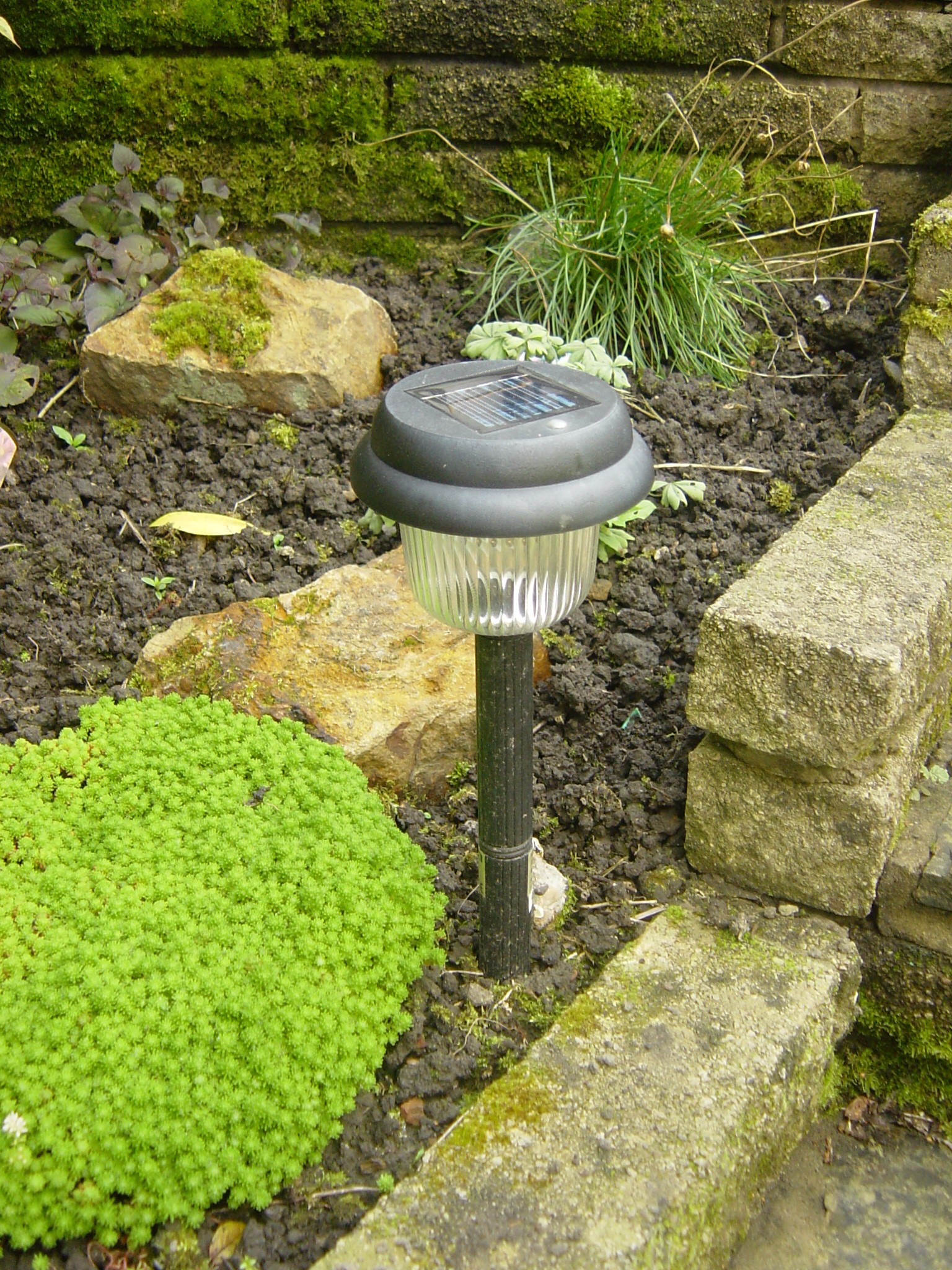
A garden solar lamp

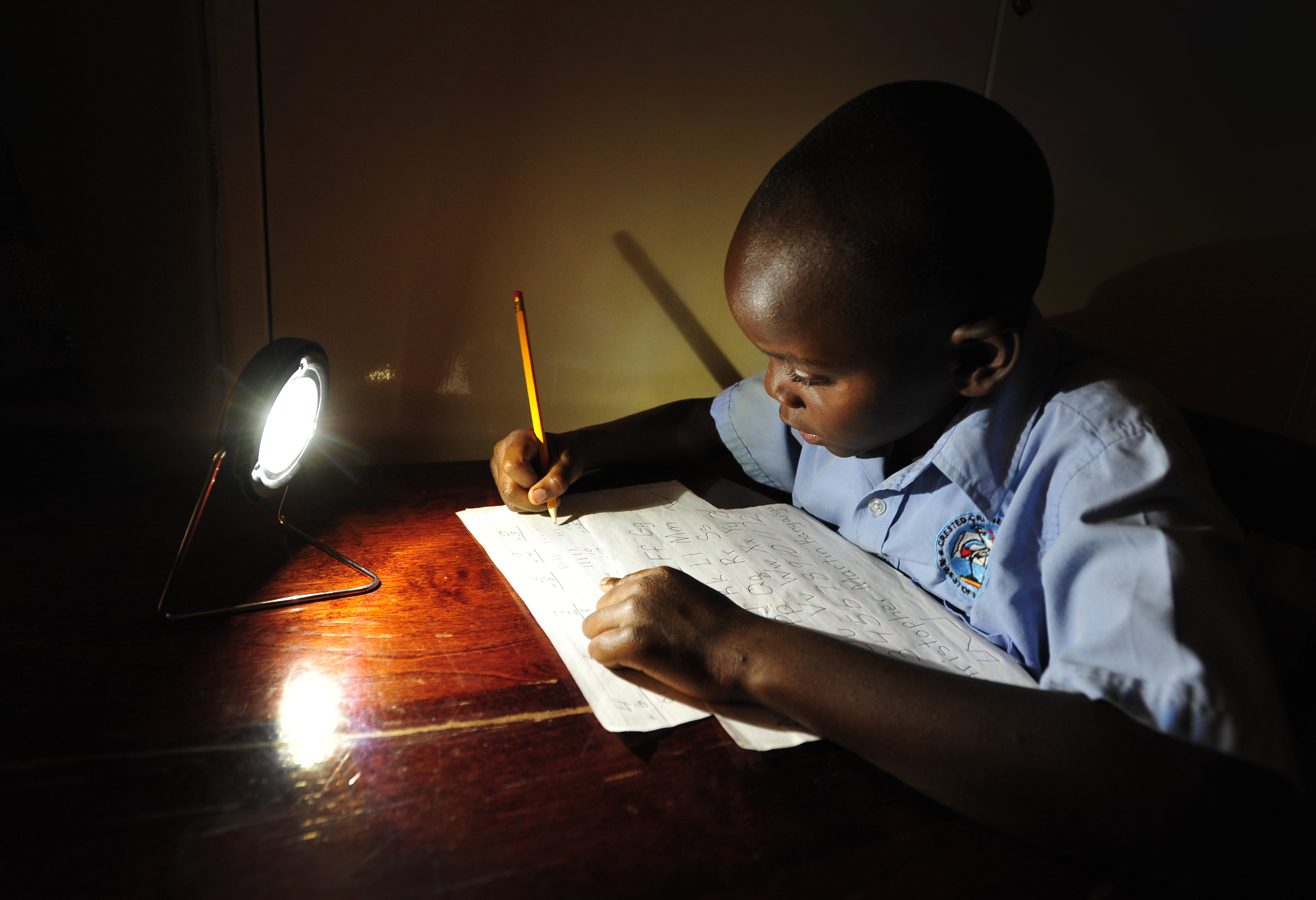
A child in Zambia studying by the light of a lamp charged by solar power during the day

A solar lamp, also known as a solar light or solar lantern, is a lighting system composed of an LED lamp, solar panels, battery, charge controller and sometimes an inverter. The lamp operates on electricity from batteries, charged through the use of a solar photovoltaic panel.

Solar-powered household lighting can replace other light sources like candles or kerosene lamps. Solar lamps have a lower operating cost than kerosene lamps because renewable energy from the sun is free, unlike fuel. In addition, solar lamps produce no indoor air pollution unlike kerosene lamps. However, solar lamps generally have a higher initial cost, and are weather dependent.

Solar lamps for use in rural situations often have the capability of providing a supply of electricity for other devices, such as for charging cell phones. The costs of solar lamps have continued to fall in recent years as the components and lamps have been mass-produced in ever greater numbers.

== History ==
Global market-share in terms of annual production by PV technology since 1990

Some solar photovoltaics use Monocrystalline silicon or poly-crystalline silicon panels, while newer technologies have used thin-film solar cells. Since modern solar cells were introduced in 1954 at Bell labs, advances in solar cell efficiency at converting light into electric power, and modern manufacturing techniques combined with efficiencies of scale have led to an international growth of photovoltaics.

The first solar light patent was filed by Maurice E Paradise in 1955. As of 2016, LED lamps use only about 10% of the energy an incandescent lamp requires. Efficiency in production of LED lamps has led to increased adoption as an alternative to older electric lightings

== Components ==
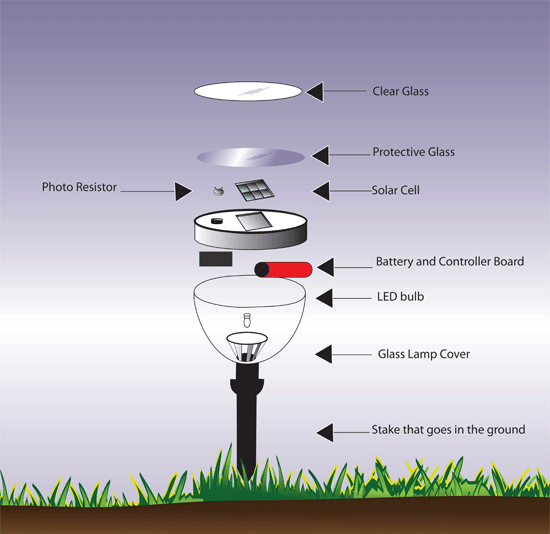
Exploded view of a garden solar lamp

=== Solar panels ===
Most solar panels are made out of single crystalline silicon, a semiconductor material. When light strikes a solar cell, an electric current is produced in the connected electric circuit. This is called the photoelectric effect. Photovoltaic systems directly convert the energy of sunlight into electricity.

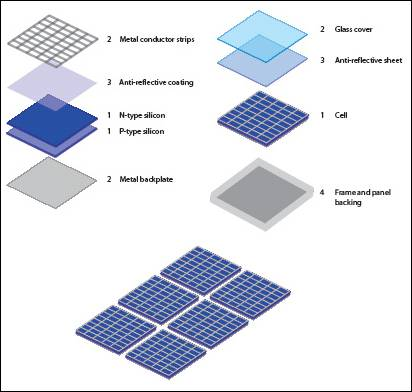
Layers of material in a solar panel

Solar panels are made out of layers of different materials, in order of glass, encapsulate, crystalline cells, back sheet, junction box and lastly frame. The encapsulate keeps out moisture and contaminants which could cause problems.

=== Battery ===
A battery is usually housed within a metal or plastic case. Inside the case are electrodes including cathodes and anodes where chemical reactions occur. A separator also exists between cathode and anode which stops the electrodes reacting together at the same time as allowing electrical charge to flow freely between the two. Lastly, the collector conducts a charge from the battery to outside.

Batteries inside solar lamps usually use gel electrolyte technology with high performance in deep discharging, in order to enable use in extreme ranges of temperature. It may also use lead-acid, nickel metal hydride, nickel cadmium, or lithium.

This part of the lamp saves up energy from the solar panel and provides power when needed at night when there is no light energy available.

In general, the efficiency of photovoltaic energy conversion is limited for physical reasons. Around 24% of solar radiation of a long wavelength is not absorbed. 33% is heat lost to surroundings, and further losses are of approximately 15-20%. Only 23% is absorbed, which means a battery is a crucial part of solar lamp.

=== Charge controller ===
This section controls the entire working systems to protect battery charge. It ensures, under any circumstances including extreme weather conditions with large temperature difference, the battery does not overcharge or over discharge and damage the battery even further.

This section also includes additional parts such as light controller, time controller, sound, temperature compensation, lighting protection, reverse polarity protection and AC transfer switches which ensure sensitive back-up loads work normally when outage occurs.

== Working principles ==
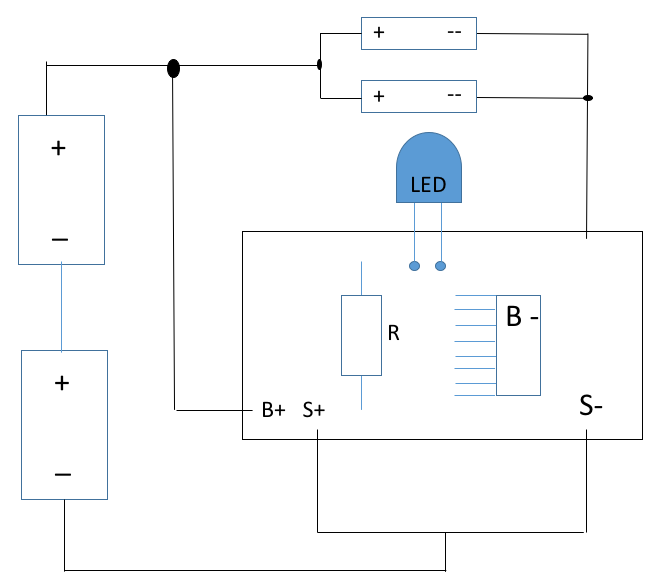
A solar lamp chip includes microchip(R), B−, B+, S− and S+. S+ and S− are both connected to solar panels with wire, one of which has plus charge and the other minus charge. B− and B+ are attached to two batteries in this case. The light will be shown through the LED light when all of these are connected.

LED lights are used due to their high luminous efficiency and long life. Under the control of a DC charge controller, non-contact control automatically turns on the light at dark and switches off at daytime. It sometimes also combines with time controllers to set certain time for it to automatically switch light on and off.

== Benefits ==
Solar lamps are easier for customers to install and maintain as they do not require an electricity cable. Solar lamps can benefit owners with reduced maintenance cost and costs of electricity bills. Solar lamps can also be used in areas where there is no electrical grid or remote areas that lack a reliable electricity supply. Over 1 billion people around the globe lack electric lighting, which contributes to continued poverty.

Solar energy output is limited by weather and can be less effective if it is cloudy, wet, or winter. Households switching to solar lamps from kerosene lamps also gain from health risk associated with kerosene emissions. Kerosene often has negative impacts on human lungs. The use of solar energy minimises the creation of pollution indoors, where kerosene has been linked to cases of health issues. However, photovoltaic panels are made out of silicon and other toxic metals, including lead that can be difficult to dispose of. The use of solar lights improves education for students who live in households without electricity. When the nonprofit Unite to Light donated solar-lamps to schools in a remote region of Kwa Zulu Natal in South Africa, test scores and pass rates improved by over 30%. The light gives students added time to study after dark.

A 2017 experimental study in un-electrified areas of northern Bangladesh found that the use of solar lanterns decreased total household expenditure, increased children's home-study hours and increased school attendance. It did not however improve the children's educational achievement to any large extent.

== Uses ==
=== Solar street light ===
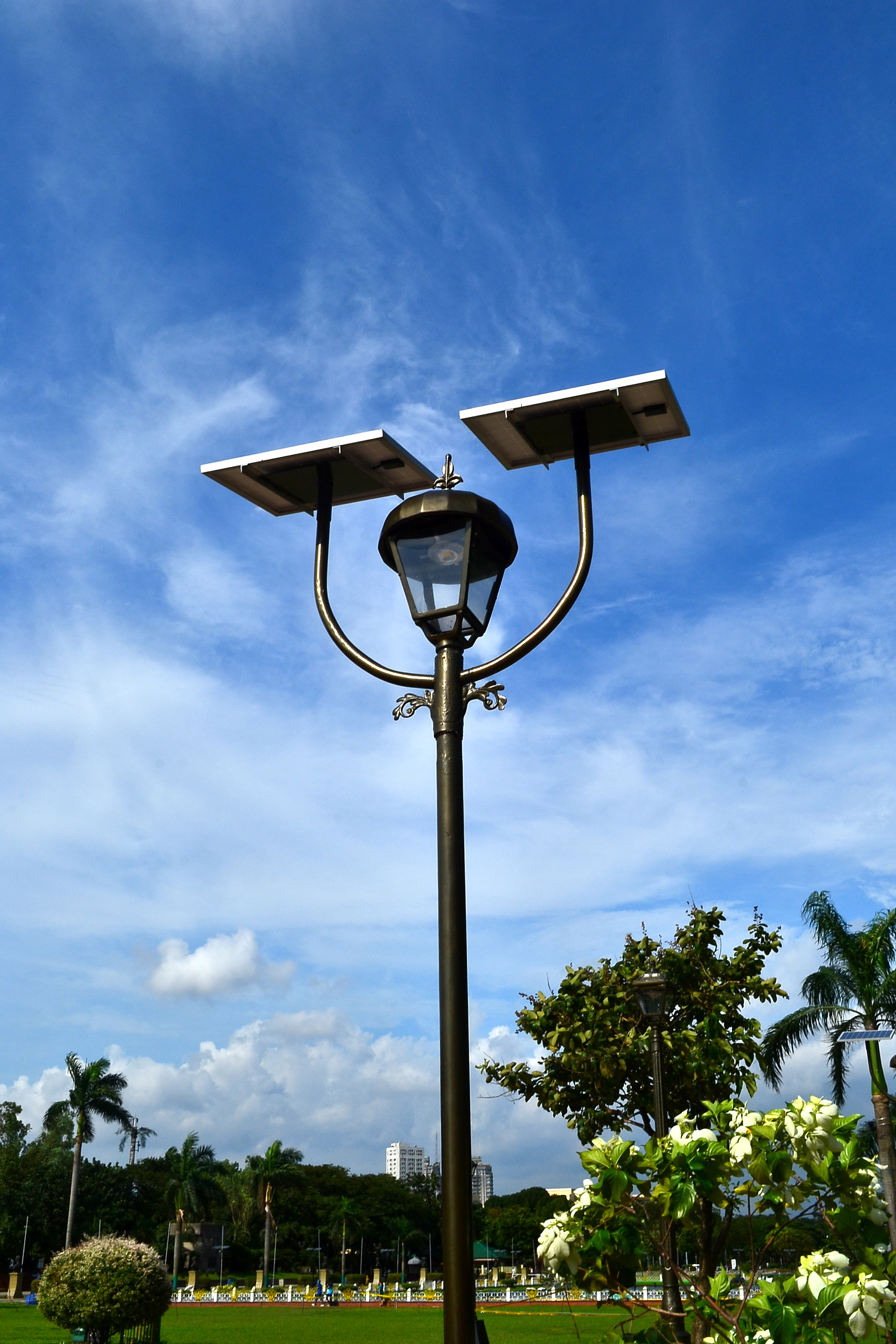
A solar lamp in Rizal Park, Philippines

These lights provide a convenient and cost-effective way to light streets at night without the need of AC electrical grids for pedestrians and drivers. They may have individual panels for each lamp of a system, or may have a large central solar panel and battery bank to power multiple lamps.

=== Garden solar lamps ===
Small solar lamps can be used by homeowners to add ambient lighting to their gardens. These lights can be found in many form factors, commonly pathway lights and spotlights.

=== Rural ===
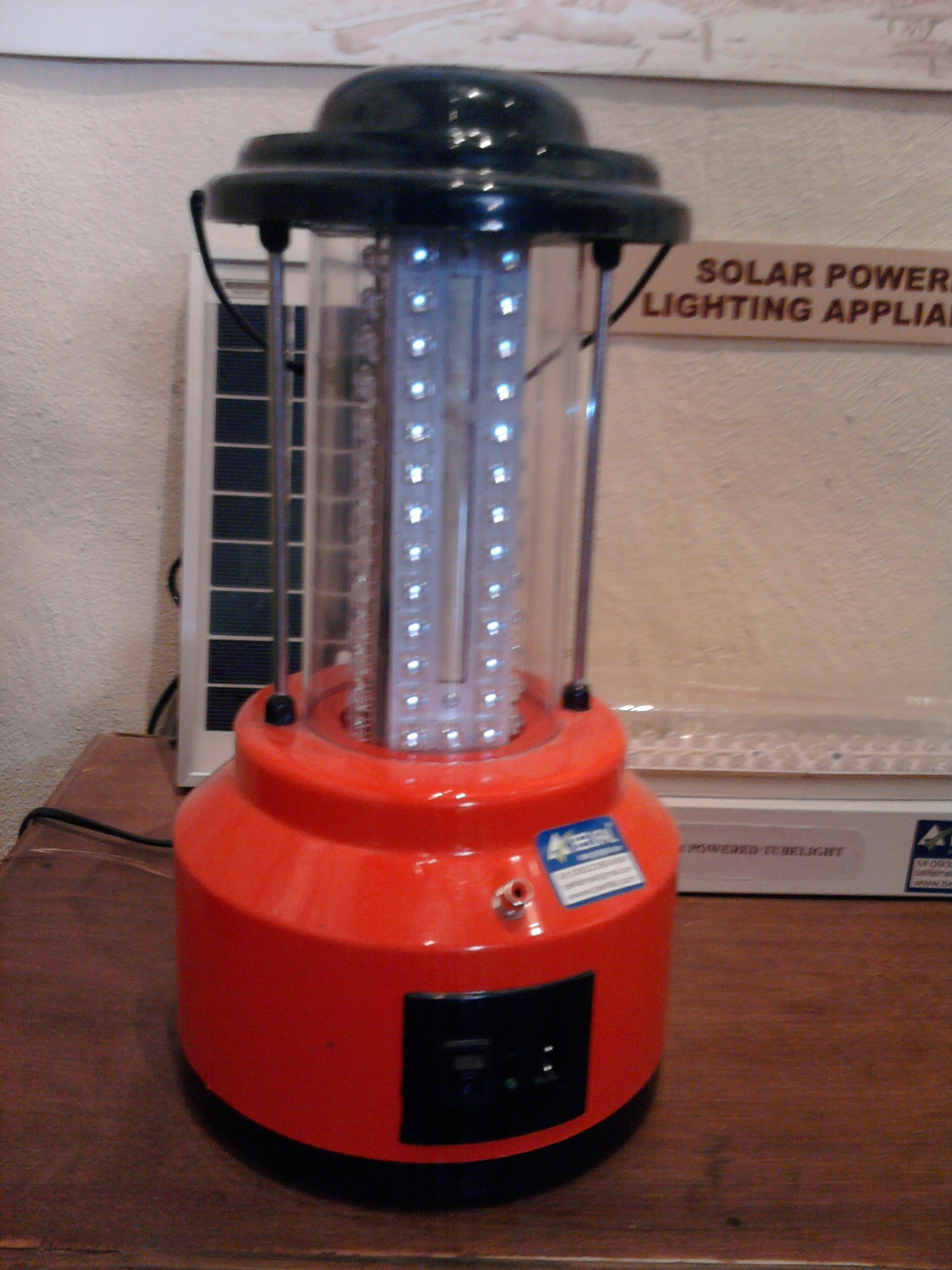
A solar LED lantern

In rural India, solar lamps, commonly called solar lanterns, using either LEDs or CFLs, are being used to replace kerosene lamps, and other cheap alternatives of lighting. Especially in areas where electricity is otherwise difficult to access, solar lamps are very useful, and it also improves the quality of life.

Africa, which has the lowest electricity access rate globally at 40% has benefited greatly through access to solar lamps and complete home lighting solutions. In many regions in Africa inadequate lighting after dusk poses safety risks. Solar lights illuminate dark streets and pathways, enhancing public safety and reducing accidents.

=== Marine ===
Marine settings are increasingly using LED solar lights as alternatives to conventional lighting. The remote nature of boating and sailing makes power hard to come by and thus lends itself to self-sufficient technologies like solar boat lighting

== Economics ==
American investors have been working towards developing a $10 per unit solar lantern for replacement of kerosene lamps. Solar home lighting solutions can be expensive to purchase. Off-grid solar organizations offer solar home lighting systems through innovative financial mechanisms such as the Pay-As-You-Go model, permitting consumers to power their entire home while paying easy monthly installments. Currently, over 40% of all sales of off-grid solar lighting products in Sub-Saharan Africa are conducted through PayGo, reaching almost 50% in Kenya and 65% in Rwanda.

== See also ==
- Light tube
- List of solar-powered products
- Liter of Light project
- Solar device
- Solar Street Lighting
- Solar thermal collector § Evacuated tube collectors
