= SR4 =

SR4 may refer to:

- Matich SR4, a sports car
- Saints Row IV, a video game
- Sergio Ramos, a Spanish professional footballer
- State Road 4 or State Route 4; see List of highways numbered 4
- The fourth iteration of Solar Roadways' panels
- SR4 - Sportsredigering rom nr. 4
