= SolaRoad =

Prototype bike path made from solar panels in the Netherlands

Coordinates: 52.4940°N 4.7664°E

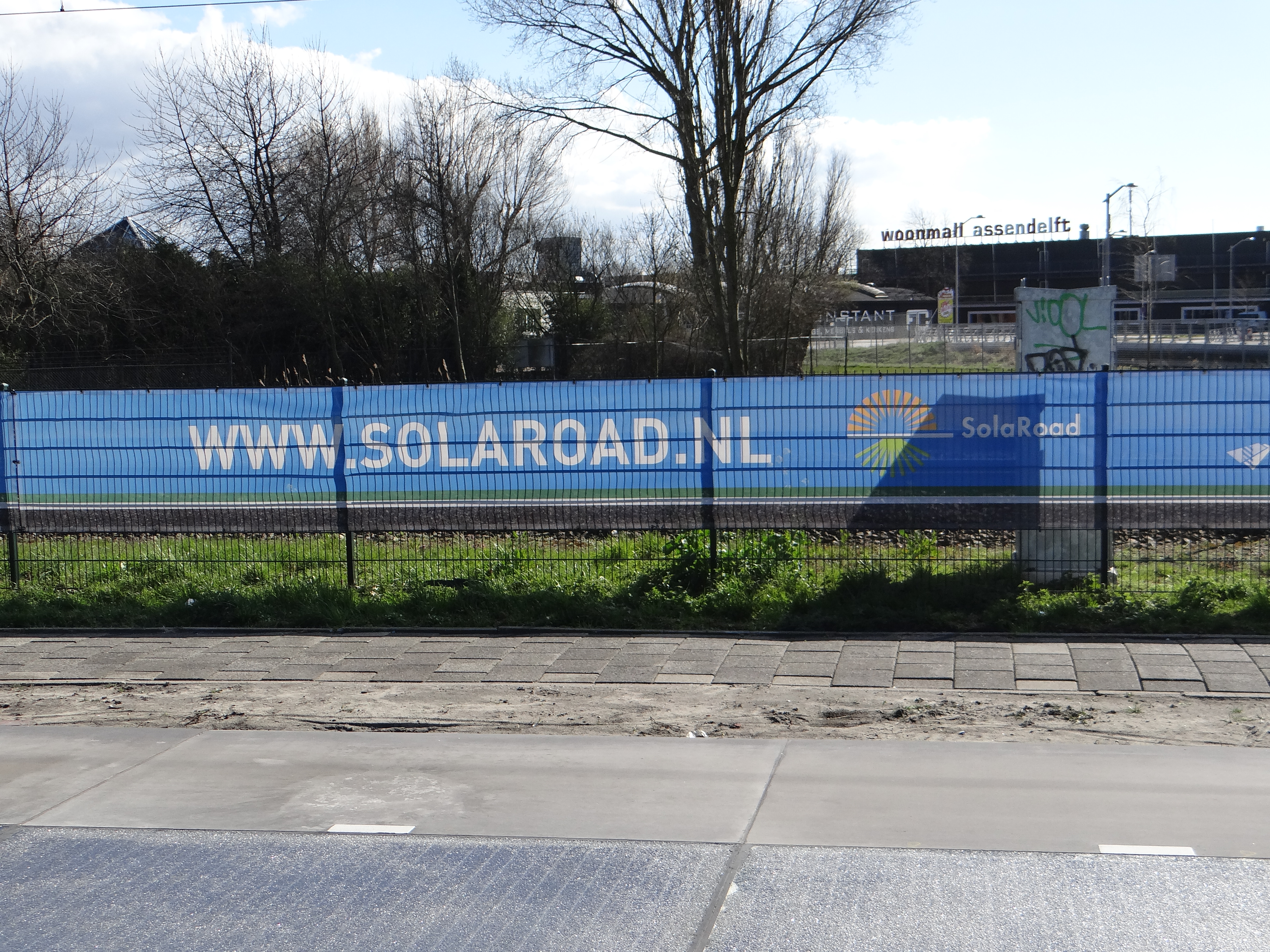
- Location: Krommenie
- Established: 21 October 2014
- Closed: 25 November 2020

The SolaRoad was the world's first bike path made from solar panels, and was a prototype project testing the feasibility of various proposals for smart highways. The 72-metre (236 ft) path opened in the week of 21 October 2014, and was designed by a consortium of organizations, which built the pathway in Krommenie, Netherlands.

The path was formally opened in November 2014 by the Dutch Minister of Energy Henk Kamp.

By January 2020, extensive damage was apparent on the path, which had led to the installation of a sign warning of 'Bad Road Surface' (Dutch: Slecht Wegdek). The path was removed in November 2020 and is considered a failure.

== Consortium ==
The technology was developed by a consortium consisting of the Netherlands Organisation for Applied Scientific Research (TNO), Imtech (Dynniq) and Ooms Civiel, with a grant of €1.5 million from the province of North Holland as owner of the path. The total cost of the pilot project was €3.5 million. In addition to the €1.5 million from the province of North Holland were that contributions from the TNO, Ooms Civil, Imtech (Dynniq) and the European PV-Sin project (partly subsidized by the Dutch government).

== Technology ==
The road surface consisted of prefabricated panels with a surface of 1 centimetre (0.39 in) thick hardened glass. Beneath the glass solar cells were installed. TNO stated that this energy can be used for lighting of the road, traffic lights and road signs. The energy was also delivered to local dwellings. TNO thought that in the future, electrical vehicles might be driven by the road itself. This prototype was studied over the next three years.

== Problems and critics ==
On 26 December 2014, a 1-square-metre (11 sq ft) section of the top-layer coating detached from the glass layer, and that portion of the bike path had to be repaired.

In October 2015 the top-layer coating was in such poor condition that it was replaced.

Critics of the technology see several problems:

- The panels might get dirty, because they are lying flat. Mud, snow, etc. might accumulate on the surface.
- The panels cannot be tilted for highest efficiency, which can be done in a roof installation.
- Cyclists will block the sunlight when passing.
- The costs are considered high (3–4 times solar panels on a roof and a conventional pavement layer); about $1,000–$1,400 per square metre ($93–$130/sq ft). This will result in a payback time of over 50 years.
- With a price of $1,200/m^{2} ($110/sq ft), a yield of 70 kilowatt-hours per square metre per year (6.5 kWh/sq ft/a) and a lifetime of 20 years, a kWh price of $0.86 can be calculated. Compared to an offshore windfarm the cost are four times higher (average kWh price $0.19). As comparison conventional electricity costs are around $0.05 per kWh.
- High costs for grid connection, which has to be (over) dimensioned for peak loads only in the summer.
- Total environmental impact during the lifetime (LCA) is expected to be negative, because of the negative contribution of the reinforced concrete slabs and the epoxy top coating layer in combination with the relatively small amount of produced electricity.
- SolaRoad could put environmental progress in the slow lane, because of the high costs of this invention.

== Results of trial ==
In the first month, the path delivered enough energy to sustain one family.

After a six-month test engineers report results are "better than expected". "If we translate this to an annual yield, we expect more than the 70kWh per square metre per year," Sten de Wit, spokesman for SolaRoad, the company that put it in.

The EEVblog compared the 6 and 12 months trial results from SolaRoad with data from 3 rooftop solar systems within a few kilometers of the prototype road. The data showed that rooftop solar systems produced twice the output of the SolaRoad per square meter over the same period.

In November 2015 it was announced that the path had produced 9800 kWh of electricity in one year.

In October 2016, the path was expanded with 7 new improved elements. Two elements of the first generation were removed. In total the expanded path consist of 32 elements (83 meters).

In February 2017, a crack appeared in the top coating of one of the improved elements.

By January 2020, extensive damage was apparent on the path, which had led to the installation of a sign warning of 'Bad Road Surface' (in Dutch: Slecht Wegdek).

The top layer of the experimental bicycle path was removed in November 2020, and replaced by normal asphalt.

== Trials with heavy traffic ==
As a follow-up to the bicycle path in Krommenie, two heavy traffic pilots were constructed early March 2019 (100 meter in Spijkenisse and 50 meter in Haarlemermeer). After a week, these pilots were closed to traffic due to problems with the top layer. In July 2019 it was decided to stop the project in Spijkenisse, the Solaroad being beyond repair.

== Comparable initiatives ==
- Solar Roadways
- Wattway
- Smart highway

An innovative cycle lane in South Korea has a solar powered roof, providing shelter from sun and rain for cyclists while generating electricity. In this concept the solar panels are directed in the most profitable position for optimal efficiency. The 32 km (20 mile) path between Daejeon and Sejong runs down the middle of a six-lane motorway.

Parking under a solar panel roof is an efficient way to produce electricity in combination with infrastructure.

Another economically viable solution for harvesting energy from roads is Road Energy Systems (RES). This system is based on solar water heating and could easily be placed in a road without changing its appearance.
