= United Nations Capital Development Fund =

United Nations agency

- Abbreviation: UNCDF
- Formation: 1966; 60 years ago
- Legal status: Active
- Headquarters: New York City, New York, U.S.
- Executive Secretary: Pradeep Kurukulasuriya (since April 2024)
- Website: www.uncdf.org

The United Nations Capital Development Fund (UNCDF) assists developing countries in the development of their economies by supplementing existing sources of capital assistance by means of grants, loans and guarantees, first and foremost for the least developed countries (LDCs) among the developing countries.

As a Flagship Catalytic Blended Financing platform of the UN, UNCDF utilizes its unique capability to crowd-in finance for the scaling of development impact where the needs are greatest—a capability rooted in UNCDF’s unique investment mandate—to support the achievement of the 2030 Agenda for Sustainable Development and the realization of the Doha Programme of Action for the least developed countries, 2022–2031.

Established by the General Assembly in 1966 and with headquarters in New York City, UNCDF is an autonomous UN organization affiliated with UNDP.

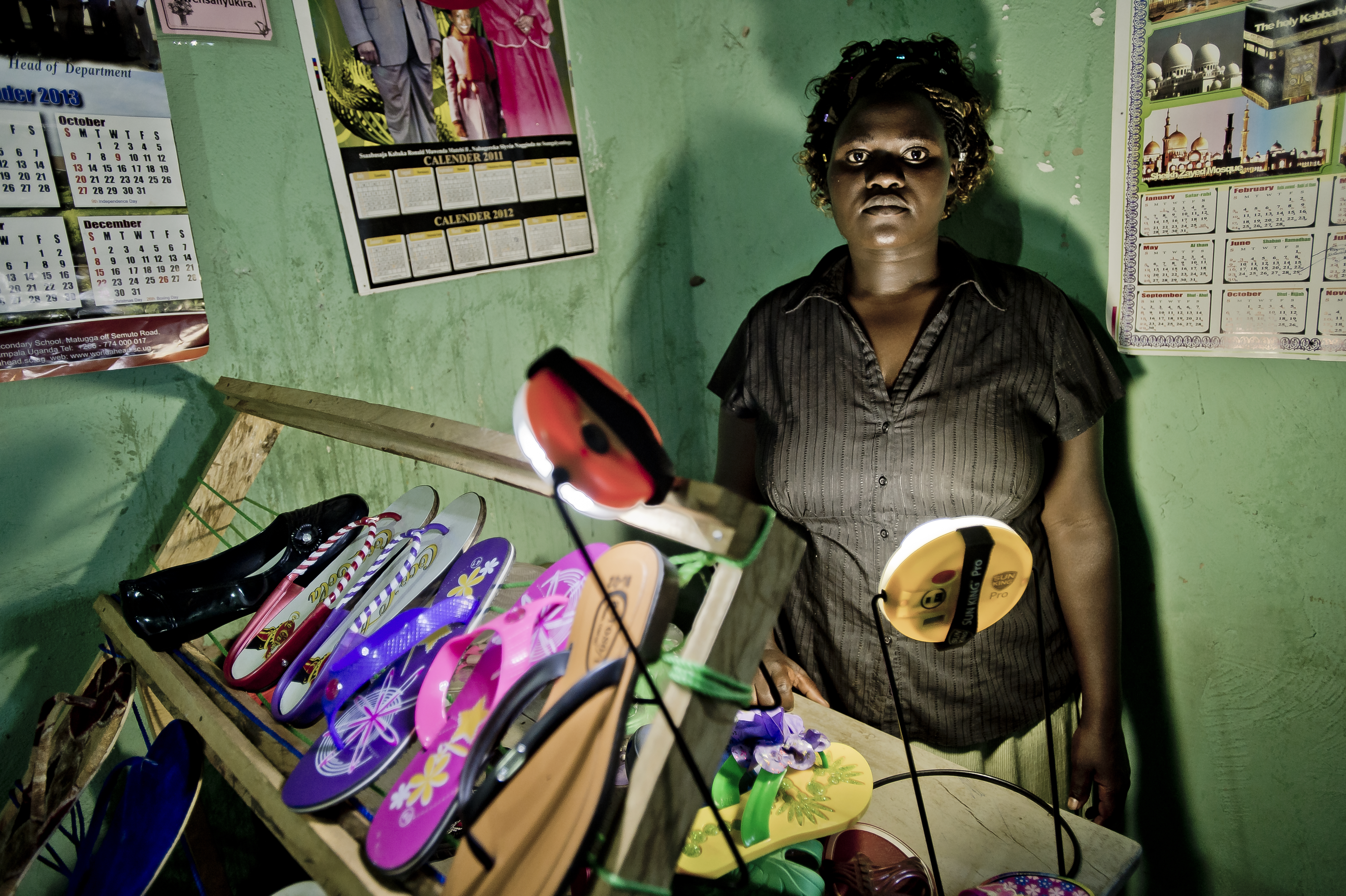
UNCDF's CleanStart programme providing a shopkeeper with solar-powered lighting to counter light poverty in an off-grid area of Uganda, as part of its inclusive finance practice area

The original UNCDF mandate from the UN General Assembly (UNGA) is to “assist developing countries in the development of their economies by supplementing existing sources of capital assistance by means of grants and loans” (General Assembly Resolution 2186, 13 December 1966). The mandate was modified in 1973 to serve first and foremost but not exclusively the LDCs.

The current Executive Secretary of UNCDF is Pradeep Kurukulasuriya.

== History ==
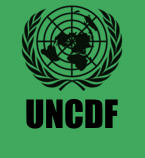
Former logo of UNCDF.

Created by the General Assembly in 1966 to promote economic development, UNCDF officially was established as an "autonomous organization within the United Nations" with the purpose to "assist developing countries in the development of their economies by supplementing existing sources of capital assistance by means of grants and loans".

In 1973, the Governing Council reoriented UNCDF's activities towards "first and foremost the least developed among the developing countries" and it began focusing on the world's least developed countries in 1974.

For the next twenty years, UNCDF financed stand-alone capital infrastructure—roads, bridges, irrigation schemes—mostly in Africa. It received about $40 million in core funding per year and operated out of UNDP country offices.

In the mid-1990s, UNCDF began focusing on the role local governments could play in planning, financing, and maintaining capital investments. Promoting effective infrastructure investment and service delivery via decentralized public financial management has been UNCDF's mainstay ever since. UNCDF's other major area of expertise—microfinance—also dates to the mid-1990s, when many of its rural development projects had credit components.

UNCDF's resources remain modest compared to many multilateral organizations. However, it has developed a considerable track record of going where others do not, and then “leveraging in” larger sources of public and private capital. In the words of a 2008 assessment by the Government of Sweden, “UNCDF should be seen as a development actor that paves the way for others, rather than a financing mechanism.”

In 2013, UNCDF received the highest score in the SmartAid for Microfinance Index, a measure of overall effectiveness in microfinance.
