= Royal Imtech N.V. =

European technical services provider

- Type: Naamloze vennootschap
- Industry: machinery industry and plant construction manufacture of ovens, furnaces and furnace burners manufacture of tanks, reservoirs and containers of metal
- Predecessor: Rheinelektra
- Defunct: August 13, 2015
- Headquarters: Gouda, Netherlands
- Key people: Gerard van de Aast (final CEO); Frans Cremers (final chairman of the supervisory board)
- Website: Imtech (archived website)

Royal Imtech N.V. was a European technical services provider in the fields of electrical solutions, ICT (information and communication technology) and mechanical solutions. Its residence was in Gouda, Netherlands. Imtech shares were listed on the Euronext Stock Exchange in Amsterdam, where Imtech was included in the AEX Index. Imtech shares were also included in the Dow Jones STOXX 600 index. With 29,000 employees, Imtech achieved annual revenue of more than 5.1 billion euros in 2012.

Imtech held positions in the building and industry markets in the Netherlands, Belgium, Luxembourg, Germany, Austria, Poland, Sweden, Norway, Finland, the UK, Ireland, Romania, Russia, Turkey and Spain, the European markets of ICT and Traffic as well as in the global marine market. In total Imtech served 24,000 customers.

In 1995, it created the subsidiary Internatio-Müller Chemical Distribution, today known as IMCD.

== Imtech Germany ==
The subsidiary Imtech Deutschland GmbH & Co. KG was also responsible for business in Poland, Romania, Austria, Finland und Russia.

Imtech was the general contractor for the technical equipment of the Deutsche Bank Twin Towers in Frankfurt. According to reports of Handelsblatt in February 2011, the subcontractors were bribed with brothel visits and more. They could invoice more hours of work than factually done since early 2010. The company made internal investigations.

Imtech Germany is involved in the construction of the heat and smoke vent of the new Berlin Brandenburg Airport. In January 2013 it was reported, that the system was not built to the requirements of the local authorities and it will not function without extensive renovation.

== Solaroad, Bike path made from solar panels ==
Imtech was part of the consortium that has built the world's first bikepath made from solar panels, known as a "Solaroad". In July 2019 it was decided to stop the project in Spijkenisse, the Solaroad is beyond repair.

== Crisis 2013/2015 ==
Royal Imtech N.V. announced on February 4, 2013 that it has to do a depreciation of 100 million Euro due to problems in Poland; Imtech warned that it would not be able to serve its obligations to its lenders. The specific cause was the project of a theme park near Warsaw with a sketched total volume of approximately 750 million Euro. This is the 240 hectare theme park Adventure World Warsaw with hotels, restaurants and a planned power plant. The problems were motivated by financial difficulties of the customer and with suspected irregularities. Imtech Germany was the general contractor.

There are forensic investigations. The managing director Klaus Betz and Axel Glaß, Chief Financial Officer and Member of the Board, left the German company. Successors are Jos Graauwmans and Jan van Middelkoop. The annual financial statements 2012, conducted by KPMG could not be presented on 5 February 2013. The Annual General Meeting of Shareholders on April 3, 2013 has been canceled.

On 18 June 2013, Imtech published a Report to shareholders with the results of the above-mentioned investigations. According to Imtech there was widespread fraud in Germany and Poland and they have announced that they will re-claim some of the damages from (former) employees held responsible for the fraud.

The net debt of the group amounted to 800 million Euro per December 31, 2012 while there is a sales amount of 5,1 billion euros in 2012. The Rabobank has been consulted for problem solving. Imtech reported on February 27, 2013 Imtech is expecting a depreciation of 150 million euros in Poland and of 150 million euros in Germany. Imtech announced a rights issue worth 500 million euros to expand its equity.

On 23 April 2013 Imtech proclaimed a reorganisation. When the corruption became known in spring 2013 the company lost a value of 1 billion Euros on the stock market. In June 2013 Imtech confessed that the internal controls had not worked.

On 27 July 2013 it was announced that a criminalist officially named as "Mr. Y" had been consulted in 2011 to investigate the corruption in the reconstruction of the twin towers in Frankfurt. He identified more than he should; he warned the company in his final report in May 2011 about mafia structures and he charged the manager of the German subsidiary, Klaus Betz. Betz was covered by the company for two years. The investigator, identified by the Telegraaf as Thomas Wüppesahl, received a ban from Imtech 2011.

On 7 October 2014 the general assembly of shareholders approved into an emission of new shares for 600 million Euro to rescue the company. The board consented that no other new emission would follow until the first quarter of 2016.

On 10 August 2015 Imtech requested protection from its creditors, similar to the Automatic stay regulation. This follows after bankruptcy of the German activities and a failed attempt to obtain a loan of 75 million Euro.

Imtech went bankrupt on 13 August 2015.

Peter Mulder, the CEO of Adventure World Warsaw (AWW) said in his 2016 interview, that "Royal Imtech was offering a full turn-key construction contract together with its financing. That is why we signed it. They were to provide everything from A to Z. They were even partially funding our day-to-day operations.(...) I was bound by confidentiality clauses. They were a stock listed company. Now, since they are gone, the situation has changed and I can tell you all about it. (...) Christmas 2012. It became obvious that Royal Imtech could not get the finance together." He also said that Imtech couldn't have had such significant losses: "It was all untrue. Royal Imtech did not invest more than EUR 22 mln – that was the working capital that they loaned to AWW and they also did some simple mechanical, electrical, engineering drawings, which cost app. EUR 5 mln. So there could never have been such losses from this project".

On 23 August 2016, a former department head of BER Airport company (Flughafen Berlin Brandenburg GmbH FBB) admitted in court to taking €150,000 in bribes from Imtech on a parking lot next to a highway in 2012. In return, he is said to have worked within FBB to ensure that additional claims in the amount of more than 60 million euros were transferred unchecked.

== See also ==
- Imtech Arena
- List of companies of the Netherlands
