= Light poverty =

Lack of artificial light after sunset

Light poverty is the state or condition in which people or communities lack artificial or electric light after sunset. This originates from many social and economic reasons, including inability to afford efficient lighting. Light poverty may also occur when a country's national grid has not electrified rural areas requiring light. As of 2019, 1.1 billion people do not have access to light, and this has many social and economic consequences, such as children being unable to study and rural markets and businesses being unable to operate due to the lack of visibility.

== Causes ==
Numerous causes contribute to light poverty. The underfunding of power plants and electric grids in the impacted nations is a significant contributing factor. Establishing dependable energy supply for their inhabitants is a logistical and financial problem for many developing countries. It is not feasible to offer energy to all rural places due to geographical constraints and significant infrastructure construction expenses. Additionally, frequent power outages interrupt daily life in areas that have access to electricity by abruptly turning on the lights in houses and businesses.

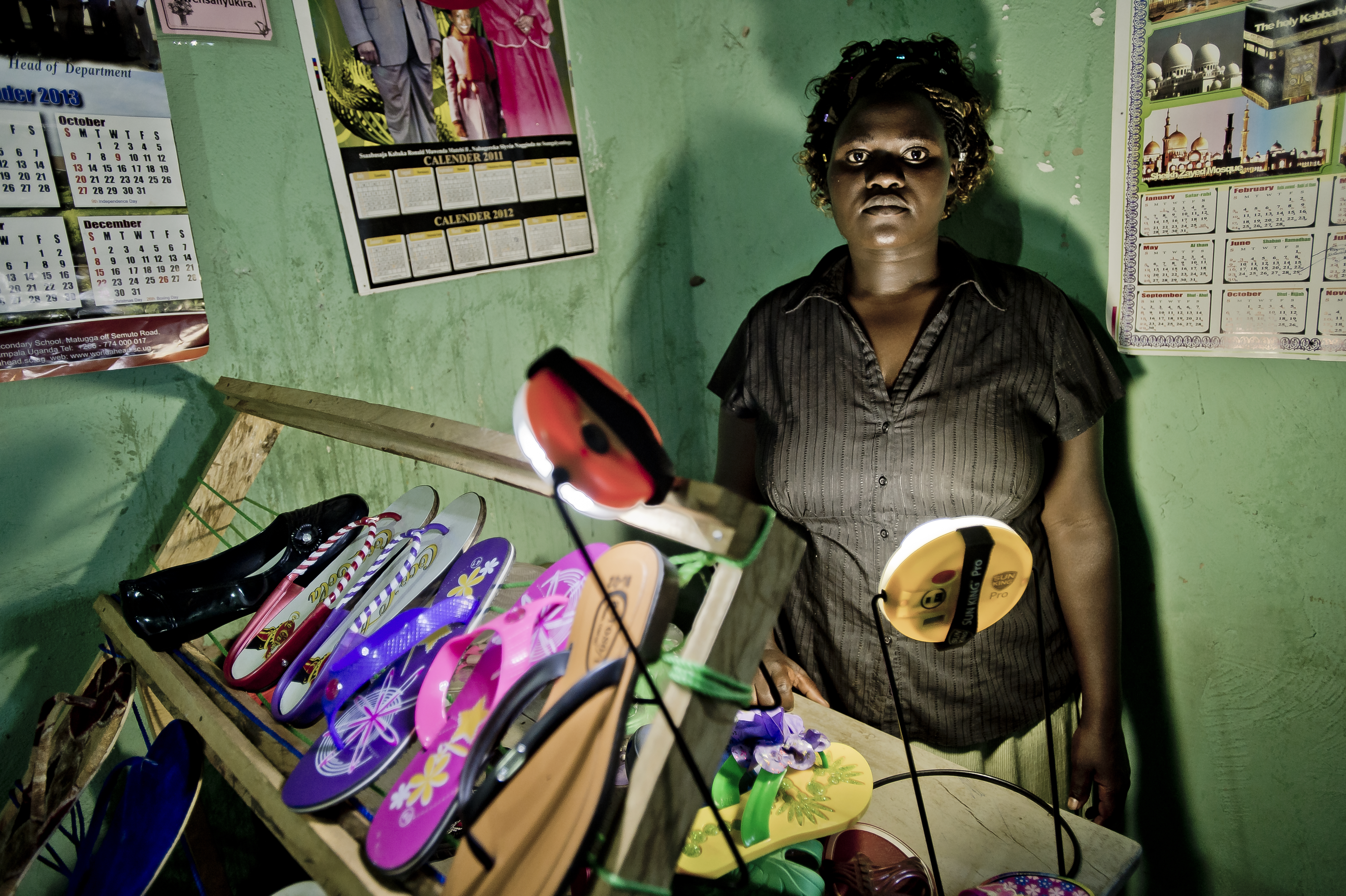
A shop owner in an off-grid area of Uganda using solar lighting solutions

Lack of off-grid options, particularly in rural regions, is another factor in light poverty. Creating stable and sustainable energy sources is essential in solving this problem. A low-cost solution that not only improves access to light but also lowers carbon emissions, indoor air pollution, and health hazards is solar-powered LED lighting. However, because of insufficient restrictions and incentive programmes in many regions of the world, the adoption of off-grid alternatives faces difficulties. The adoption of these technologies is hampered by red tape, which prevents their broad usage and impedes the effort to end light poverty.

== Proposed solutions ==
=== Solar-LED lanterns ===
Adoption of solar-LED lanterns is one way to solve the lack of access to light. Small and potent white LED light sources are used in these lanterns; They may be powered by solar cells and common batteries. They may be carried around, are ready to use immediately, and don't need to be professionally installed. Almost 100 high-quality solar-LED devices with various features and pricing points are already available. These technologies can pay for themselves within a year, depending on local paraffin costs, giving those who live in non-electrified areas an affordable and environmentally friendly lighting option. Millions of African homes now have better access to electricity due to the widespread usage of solar-LED lanterns, proving their feasibility and scaling potential.

=== Light centres powered by solar energy ===
The creation of light centres powered by solar energy is another option for solving light poverty, especially in bigger urban areas. Solar panels and effective LED luminaires are combined in these facilities to produce light for a sizable surface area. They are capable of providing dependable, clean illumination for regions the size of a football field, overcoming the difficulties posed by unstable electric systems and frequent power outages. Light centres can have lower total costs of ownership than grid-based alternatives and are simple to build and operate.
