= Solar traffic light =

Traffic light powered by solar panels

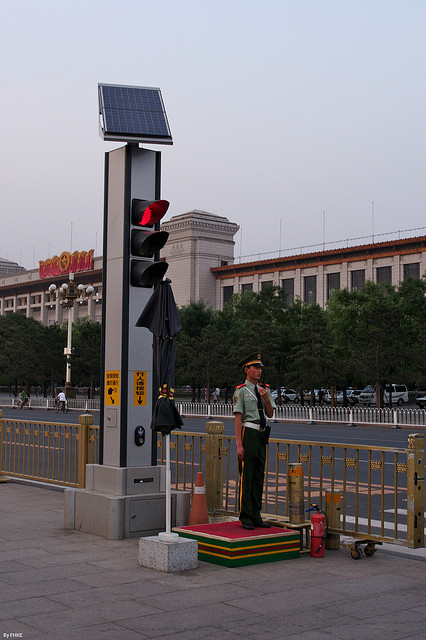
Solar-energy-powered traffic light

Solar traffic lights are signalling devices powered by solar panels positioned at road intersections, pedestrian crossings and other locations to control the flows of traffic. They assign the right of way to road users by the use of lights in standard colors (red - amber/yellow - green), using a universal color code.

== Features ==
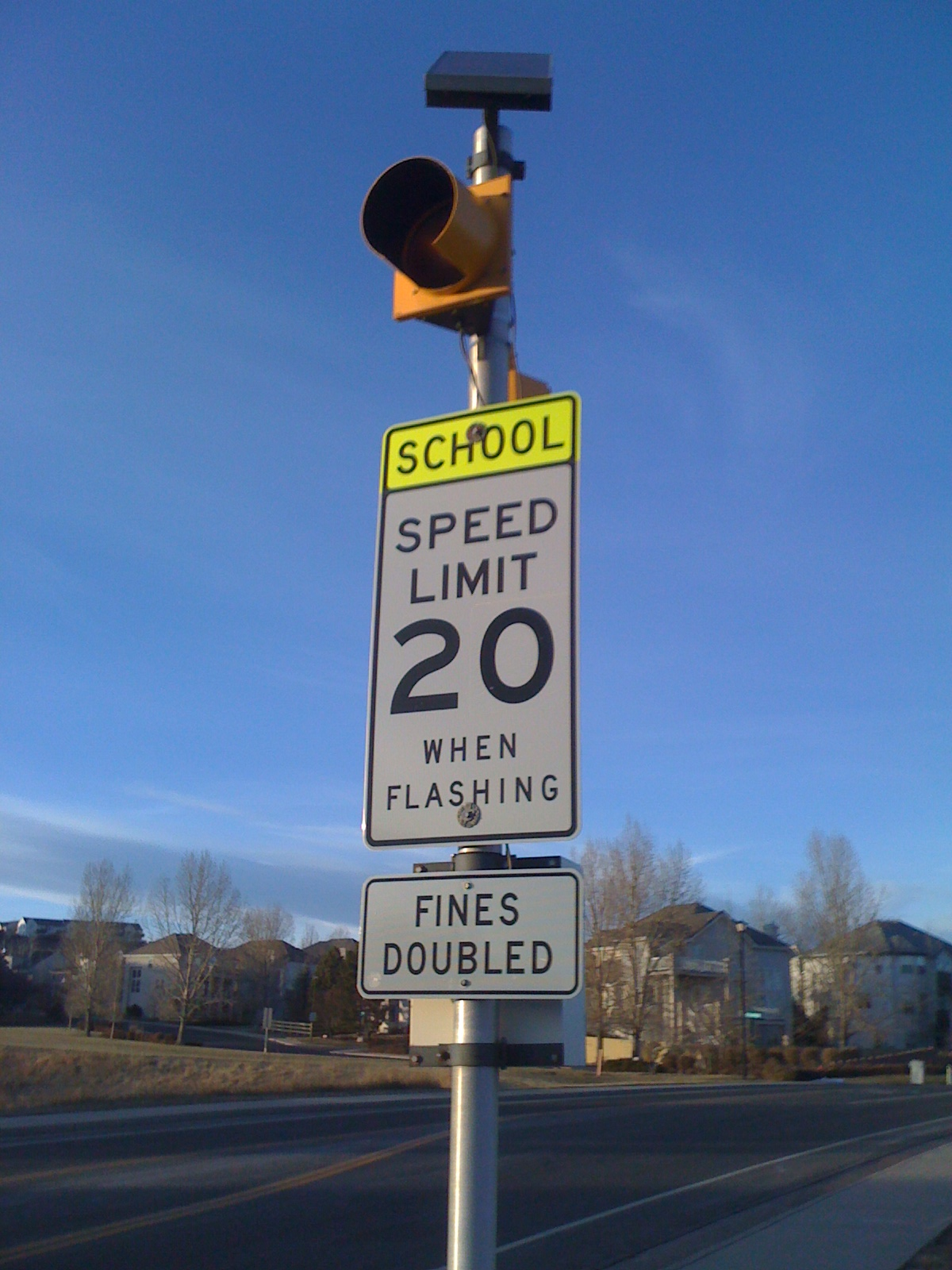
Solar-energy-powered school traffic light

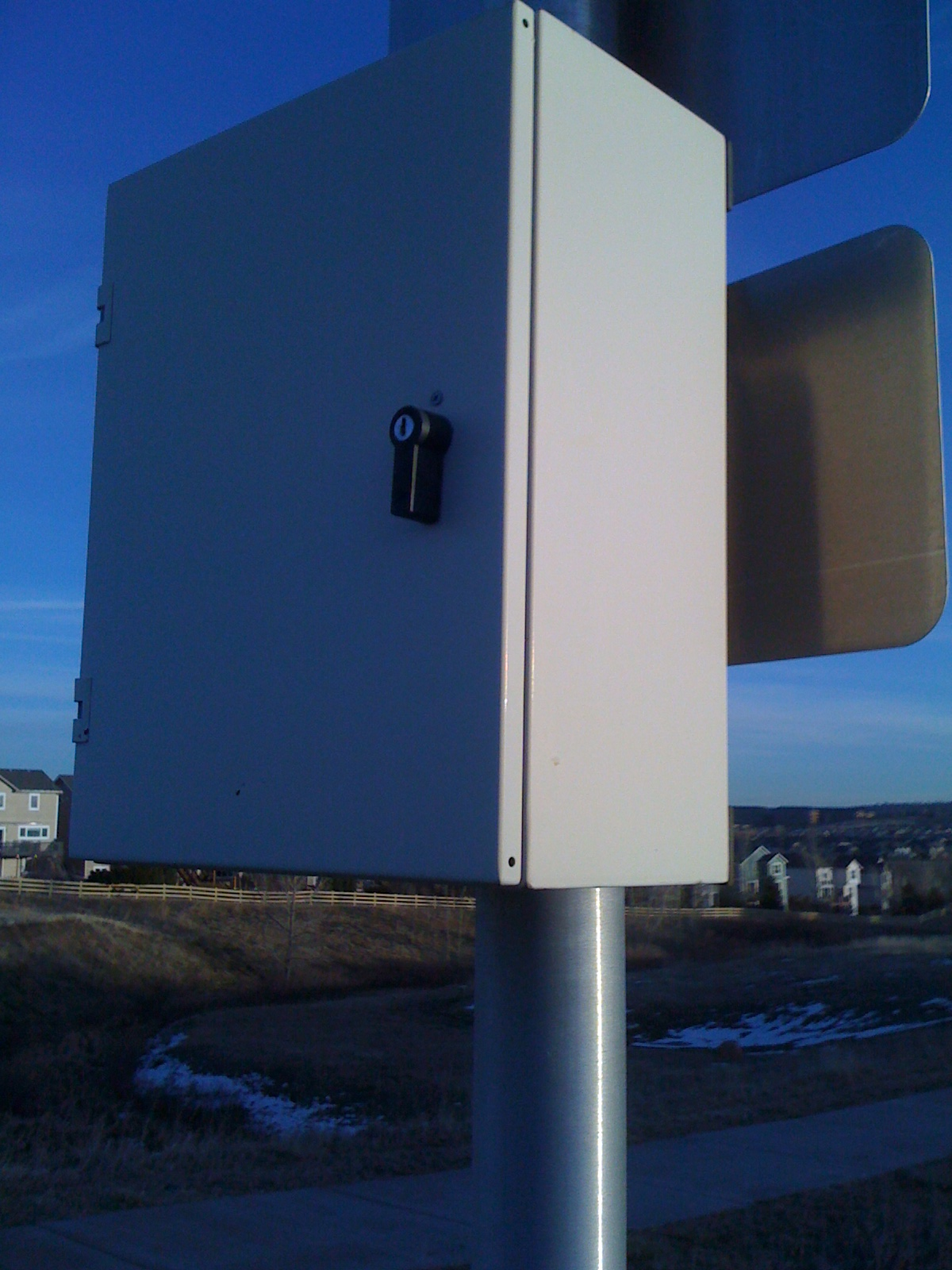
Solar Panel Battery Enclosure on Traffic Light

Most solar traffic lights use LED lamps as they are more reliable and have more advantages over other lighting devices like CFL lamps as they are more energy efficient, have a longer life span and turn on and turn off quickly. Solar traffic lights contain enclosures which house the batteries and the control panel circuitry. Existing traffic lights can also be upgraded with an auxiliary power source using solar panels for use during power failures. The other parts in a solar traffic light include a charge controller to control the charging and discharging of the battery and a countdown timer which displays the amount of time left before the battery discharges fully.

== As an auxiliary system ==
Auxiliary solar traffic lights, in addition to the existing street lights, can be attached near the primary street lights. They are useful in regulating traffic when the primary system fails. The control system in the auxiliary traffic light monitors the primary system and when the primary system fails, it switches to the auxiliary system. Switching from primary system to the auxiliary system and vice versa can also be achieved using a hand-held transmitter unit.

== During natural disasters ==
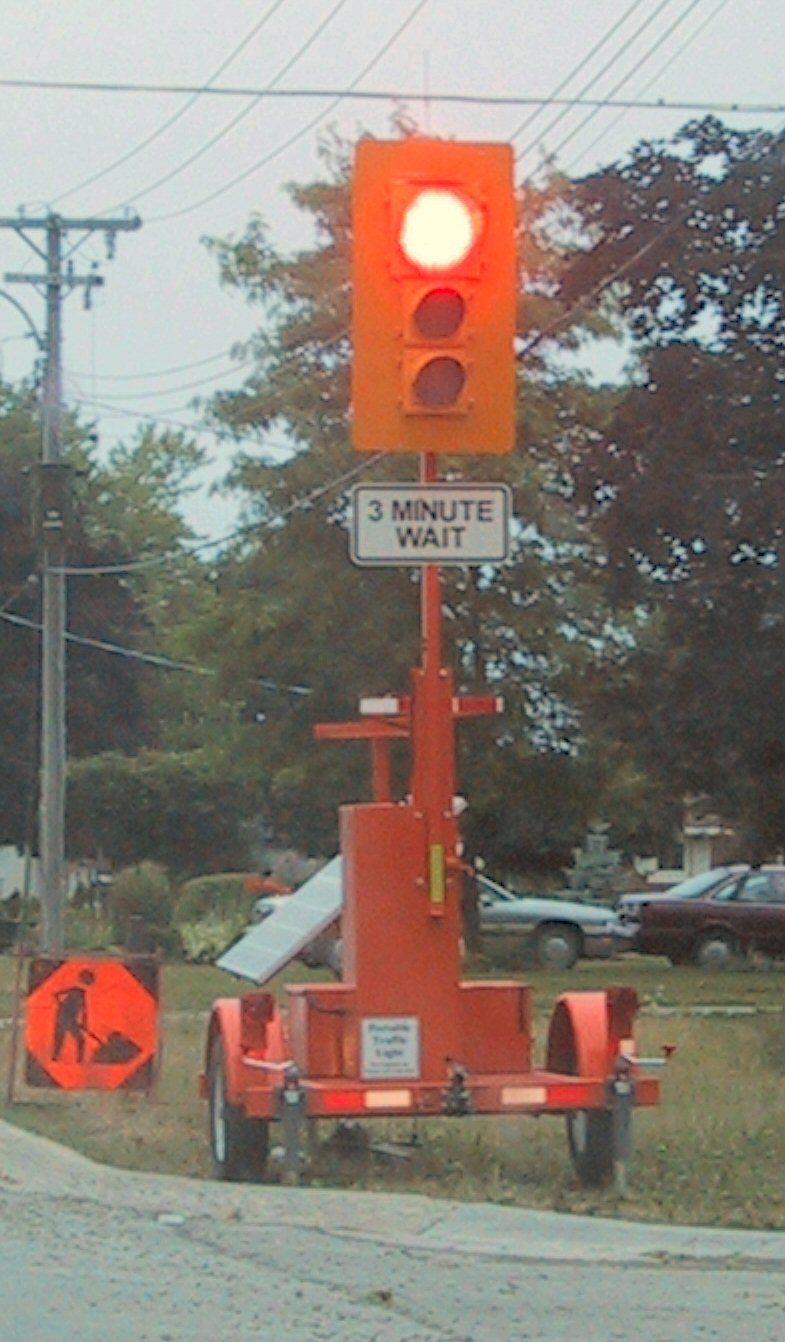
Portable, solar-powered, traffic light used when construction workers must narrow a 2-way street to a single lane and must emplace traffic controls for safety.

Solar traffic lights can also be used during periods following natural disasters, when the existing street lights may not function due to power outages and the traffic is uncontrollable. Street lights used in such scenarios are designed to be portable enough to be carried and operated by police and relief workers wherever traffic needs to be regulated.

== Advantages ==
- Solar traffic lights are self-sufficient as they do not require external power sources.
- They are easy to set up and operate.
- They require very little to no maintenance as they have no moving parts.

== Disadvantage ==
- Risk of theft is higher as equipment costs are comparatively higher.
- Snow or dust, combined with moisture can accumulate on horizontal PV-panels and reduce or even stop energy production.
- Rechargeable batteries will need to be replaced several times over the lifetime of the fixtures adding to the total lifetime cost of the light. The charge and discharge cycles of the battery are important considering the overall cost of the project.
