= Unite to Light =

Nonprofit organization

- Founded: 2010 in Santa Barbara, California, U.S.
- Founder: John E. Bowers
- Type: Charitable Organization
- Legal status: 501(c)(3) organization
- Purpose: Improving education and health by providing solar powered reading lights and technology to third world countries.
- Location: Santa Barbara, California, U.S.
- Region served: International
- Key people: Megan Birney, CEO Gisela Voss, Project Manager for Luke Light and Board of Directors; Suzanne Cross, Africa Director and Board of Directors; Claude Dorais, former President and Board of Directors; Dawn Mitcham, Board of Directors Wade Nomora, Board of Directors
- Revenue: $200,000
- Website: www.unitetolight.org

Unite to Light is a Santa Barbara-based nonprofit organization that works to distribute low-cost solar lamps and solar chargers to people without access to electricity.

As of January 1 2026, over 280,444 lights had been distributed to more than 80 countries with the goal of improving education, health, and disaster preparedness.

== History ==
In 2009 a professor visiting from Ghana, Osei Darkwa, lamented to faculty at the University of California Santa Barbara (UCSB), Institute for Energy Efficiency (IEE) that students from rural parts of their country were unprepared for the rigors of the university. They noted that if the students had access to safe, affordable and reliable lights, students would be able to spend more time studying and also replace the kerosene lamps and candles that cause financial, health, and environmental issues. At the time, the available solar LED lights on the market cost $30, a price point far above what the average family in Ghana was able to spend.

The IEE team, in conjunction with UCSB's Engineers Without Borders, designed, developed, and began distribution of a new light in 2010 through the newly created non-governmental organization, Unite to Light. John E. Bowers, director of IEE, spearheaded the project, along with Claude Dorais, and the development of the light was aided by advice from scientist Shuji Nakamura and physicist Alan J. Heeger. Their combined efforts created a durable, portable, low-cost, reliable solar light with one rechargeable battery.

Since 2010, Unite to Light has distributed this solar light throughout the globe. In 2012 the solar light was renamed the Luke Light in honor of 19-year-old graduate Lucas Voss-Kernan, who had died that year and in whose name a fundraiser was held to donate lights to off-the-grid Kenyan communities.

In 2014 Unite to Light developed a new device, a solar light with a USB port that charges cell phones and e-readers. This new product was in response to demand for a way to charge cell phones in areas without reliable electricity. In 2018 the device was updated with a larger battery, two USB outputs to charge multiple devices at once, and a more compact design. Partners including Hope Health Action Network and Maternity Foundation use these chargers to aid midwives in their communities and continue their training in the field. In 2019 the Luke Light's design was further developed to be brighter, longer lasting, and waterproof.

== Projects ==
Roughly 2 billion people in the world do not have access to reliable electricity. Unite to Light manufactures and distributes efficient, durable, low cost solar lamps and solar chargers to people without access to electricity. Megan Birney, president of Unite to Light, notes: “We focus on projects that help children learn to read and study at night, equip midwives with the tools they need to do their job, and to offer relief to those suffering from disasters."

=== Education ===
A major area of focus for the Unite to Light project is on education, supplying lights to students who could use the lights to study at night. Not only are the kerosene lamps students use to study less reliable, but four hours of sitting near them cause exposure to fumes equal to smoking two packs of cigarettes. In areas where Unite to Light's solar lights were distributed, there was improvement in students' exam scores.

Since 2013, Unite to Light has partnered with WE Charity in Haiti to distribute solar lights to students in rural communities without electricity. Students who are given lights are 30% more likely to pass from their current grade into the next one, keeping them in school longer and increasing their chances of greater health and earned income.

In 2015 Unite to Light partnered with the Makhasa School in South Africa to create their first Light Library, in which Luke Lights are borrowed and returned by students on a basis similar to books in public libraries. In 2017 Unite to Light donated 1,000 lights and opened 14 Light Libraries across South African schools, and the following year donated an additional 1,500 solar lights. To judge the efficacy of these lights on student performance, Unite to Light received data on the pass rates of the Matric Exam, which students must pass to graduate from high school. Comparing 2015 pre-Light Library test scores to those after the Light Libraries had been implemented in 2017, there was an increase in pass rates of 21%. In 2018 there was an additional average score increase of 5%.

=== Health ===
==== Global health ====
Partnering with the United Nations Population Fund's Safe Birth Even Here campaign, Unite to Light created the Light for Life project, in which solar lights are distributed to midwives in conflict zones and rural regions. This is part of an effort to reduce the number of deaths from childbirth. In 2017, Unite to Light and UNFPA distributed 11,000 solar lights to the Bangladesh Midwifery Society for the Rohingya refugee mothers. They shifted focus in 2018 to aid midwives in Paraguay.

In 2011, with the KAITEKI Institute, Unite to Light partnered with Direct Relief to donate lights to global midwifery training programs. A major recipient is the Edna Adan Maternity Hospital in Somaliland.

==== Local health ====
In 2017 Unite to Light partnered with Santa Barbara's Safe Parking Program and distributed 50 Luke Lights and solar chargers to dehoused populations living out of their cars in Santa Barbara. This was brought about due to efforts from local donor Mike Tognotti and his family. In 2019, through funding by SB Gives, Unite to Light distributed 72 more solar chargers.

=== Disaster response ===
Basic infrastructure is often impacted in disasters, leaving many without light. Two days after the Fukushima earthquake, Unite to Light sent 2,000 lights to the Fukushima region to provide light to those without power, funded by the KAITEKI Institute, a subsidiary of Mitsubishi Chemical Holdings Corporation. 1,000 lights were provided to the Urato Islands in Miyagi Prefecture and 1,000 lights to the Kesennuma city in the Ooshima area. After Hurricane Maria devastated Puerto Rico in 2017, Unite to Light teamed up with Direct Relief to send 2,550 solar lights to the island. Earlier that year they partnered with Direct Relief to send 1,000 lights to victims of flooding in Peru. Additionally, Unite to Light provides lights and chargers for Direct Relief's Disaster Hold every year.

== Operations ==
Unite to Light functions under multiple business models. They are a traditional nonprofit, raising funds through donations and grants in order to make and donate lights.

Additionally, the nonprofit sells through two different models. Under one model, Unite to Light sells lights to nonprofits and individuals at cost so that they may further their own missions to help those without electricity. This includes Rotary Clubs, school groups, and student travelers.

Under the second model, Unite to Light employs a TOMS Shoes model, in which for every light they sell, they donate another light. This model is referred to as BOGO: Buy One, Give One. To distribute, they use strategic partners, including the Edna Adan Foundation in Somaliland, UNFPA, WE Charity, and Direct Relief. Unite to Light stresses that they are careful to give away lights only to people who would not otherwise have been able to afford even a low-cost solar light.
