= Solar street light =

Raised light sources which are powered by solar panels

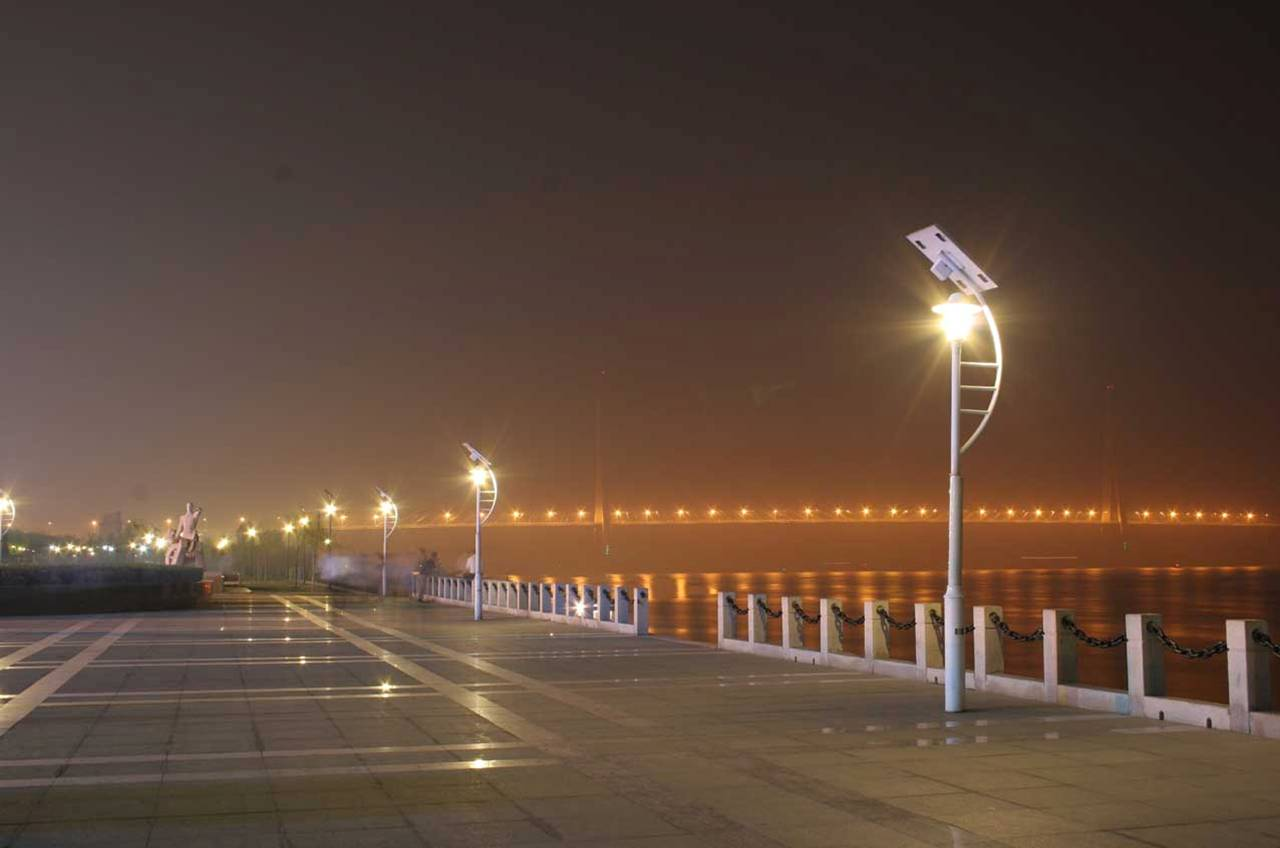
Solar street lighting

Solar street lights are raised light sources which are powered by solar panels generally mounted on the lighting structure or integrated into the pole itself. The solar panels charge a rechargeable battery, which powers a fluorescent or LED lamp during the night.

== Features ==
Most solar lights turn on and turn off automatically by sensing outdoor light using solar panel voltage. Solar streetlights are designed to work throughout the night. Many can stay lit for more than one night if the sun is not in the sky for an extended period of time. Older models included lamps that were not fluorescent or LED. Solar lights installed in windy regions are generally equipped with flat panels to better cope with the winds.

Modern designs use wireless technology and fuzzy control theory for battery management. The street lights using this technology can operate as a network with each light having the capability of performing the turning on and off of the network.

== Components ==
Solar street lights consist of four main parts:

=== Solar panel ===
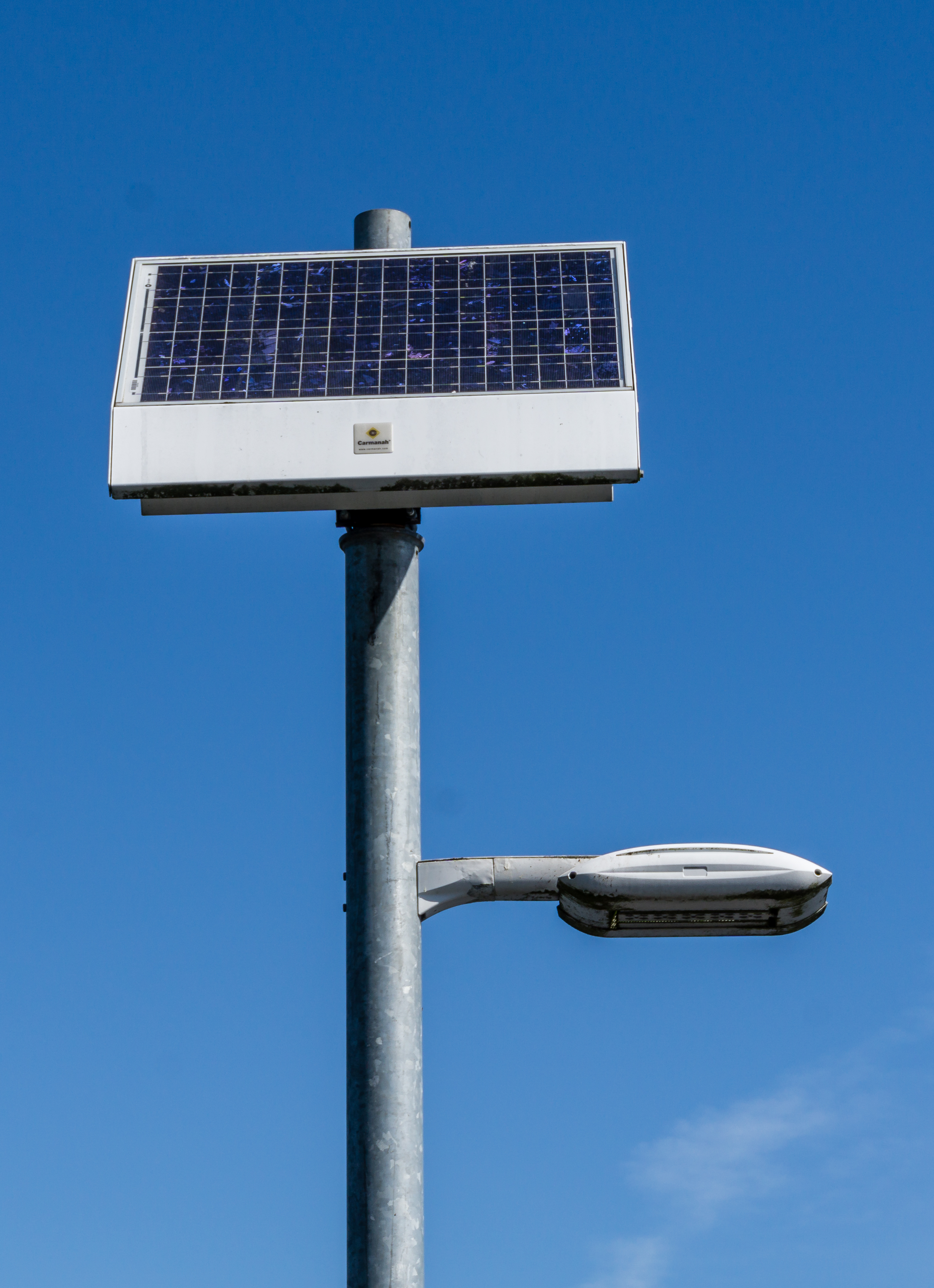
A solar street light in British Columbia, Canada

The solar panel is one of the most important parts of a solar street light, as the solar panel can convert solar energy into electricity that the lamps can use. There are two types of solar panels commonly used in solar street lights: monocrystalline and polycrystalline. The conversion rate of mono-crystalline solar panels is much higher than their poly-crystalline counterparts. Solar panels also vary in wattage systems.

=== Lighting fixture ===
LEDs are usually used as the primary lighting source of modern solar street lights, as the LED will provide much higher luminosity with lower energy consumption. The energy consumption of an LED fixture is at least 50% lower than the HPS fixture counterpart which is widely used as the lighting source in traditional street lights. A lack of warm-up time in LEDs also allows for use of motion detectors for additional efficiency gains.

=== Rechargeable battery ===
Batteries will store the electricity generated by the solar panel during the day and provide energy to the fixture during the night. The life cycle of the battery is very important to the lifetime of the light and the capacity of the battery will affect the backup days of the lights. There are two types of batteries commonly used in solar-powered street lights- gel cell deep cycle batteries as well as lead acid batteries. Lithium-ion batteries are also popular due to their compact size.

=== Pole ===
Strong poles are necessary to all street lights, especially to solar street lights as there are often components mounted on the top of the pole: fixtures, panels and sometimes batteries. However, in some newer designs, the PV panels and all electronics are integrated in the pole itself. Wind resistance is also a factor.

In addition, accessories do exist for these types of poles, such as a foundation cage and battery box.

== Type ==
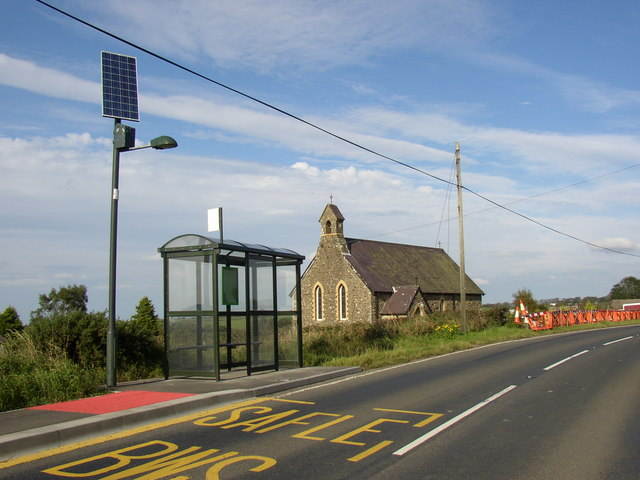
Solar street light at a bus stop

Each street light can have its own photo voltaic panel, independent of other street lights. Alternately, a number of panels can be installed as a central power source on a separate location and supply power to a number of street lights.

All-in-one type solar street lights are gaining popularity due to their compact design which incorporates all of the parts necessary in a compact manner including the battery.

The city of Las Vegas, Nevada was the first city in the world that tested new EnGoPlanet Solar Street lights which are coupled with kinetic tiles that produce electricity when people walk over them.

== Advantages ==
- Solar street lights are independent of the utility grid. Hence, the operation costs are minimized.
- Solar street lights require much less maintenance compared to conventional street lights.
- Since external wires are eliminated, risk of accidents are minimized.
- Electricity produced from solar panels is non-pollutive.
- Separate parts of a solar panel system can easily be transported.

== Disadvantages ==
- Initial investment is higher compared to conventional street lights.
- Risk of theft is higher as equipment costs are comparatively higher.
- Snow or dust, combined with moisture can accumulate on horizontal PV-panels and reduce or even stop energy production.
- Rechargeable batteries will need to be replaced several times over the lifetime of the fixtures adding to the total lifetime cost of the light.

The charge and discharge cycles of the battery are also very important considering the overall cost of the project.

== See also ==
- Light pollution
- List of solar-powered products
- Street light
