= Thunderf00t =

British chemist and YouTuber

Phil E. Mason
- Born: Philip E. Mason; England
- Other names: Thunderf00t; VoiceofThunder
- Known for: Atheism (criticism of religion and creationism); Work on the reaction of alkali metals with water; Criticism of Anita Sarkeesian (Feminism); Criticism of Elizabeth Holmes (Theranos); Criticism of Elon Musk (Hyperloop, Boring Company, Tesla, and SpaceX); Criticism of Solar Roadways; Criticism of Donald Trump
- Scientific career
- Education: Chemistry: BSc (1993); PhD (1997)
- Alma mater: University of Birmingham
- Fields: Food Science (2002–2012); Organic Chemistry and Biochemistry (2013–present)
- Workplaces: Cornell University (2002–2012); Academy of Sciences of the Czech Republic 2013–present)
- Thesis: Novel Architectures in Polymer Chemistry (1997)
- Doctoral advisor: I.W. Parsons

YouTube information
- Channel: Thunderf00t
- Years active: 2006–present
- Subscribers: 1.05 million
- Views: 361 million
- Last updated: September 23, 2026

Philip E. Mason is a British chemist and YouTuber with the online pseudonym Thunderf00t (also VoiceOfThunder). He is best known for his critiques of religion, pseudoscience and creationism. He works at the Institute of Organic Chemistry and Biochemistry of the Czech Academy of Sciences.

== Early life ==
Mason received a BSc (2:1) (1993) and PhD (1997) in chemistry from the University of Birmingham. From 2003 until at least August 2010, Mason was affiliated with the University of Bristol.

== Career ==
Mason worked at Cornell University's department of food science from 2002 until 2012, where he studied the molecular interactions between water and sugar molecules, as well as molecular modeling with regard to proteins and guanidinium solutions. As of 2025, he was working at the Institute of Organic Chemistry and Biochemistry of the Academy of Sciences of the Czech Republic as a member of a research group headed by Pavel Jungwirth.

=== Alkali metals research ===
Mason, on his own and with some fellow technical workers, did original physical chemistry research into the nature of the alkali metals (sodium and potassium, for example) and their chemistry with oxygen and water. It has been known since the metals could be obtained in pure forms that they are explosive when dropped into water. It has long been thought this was caused by the dissociation of water by the metal, releasing hydrogen and oxygen which recombined in an explosion. Mason developed experimental methods and results that indicate the first reaction of alkali metals and water was coulombic (that is, electrical charge forces) in nature which shatters and drives the metal in an extremely pure state into the water, causing both further coulombic and water dissociation. This result, developed in 2015, was completely new to chemistry. His co-authored research was published in the journal Nature Chemistry.

On 5 June 2020, his co-authored research on solvated electrons dissolved in ammonia was published in the science journal Science.

== Online activities ==
Mason produces YouTube videos under the pseudonym Thunderf00t. A 2012 journal article stated that Thunderf00t's channel and P.Z. Myers' blog were "among the two most popular secularist hubs online."

Mason has used his online persona to critically examine a range of topics, including proposals to build roads surfaced with glass solar panels. He has also criticised Elizabeth Holmes, Anita Sarkeesian, and Elon Musk.

In 2015, Jenny Keller, who ran the YouTube channel "Laughing Witch", attempted to get Mason fired by sending letters to his employer. Keller stated that these efforts were intended to pressure Mason to change what she considered sexist and islamophobic content on his channel. After promoting the campaign online, Mason responded by posting a series of videos scrutinizing Keller and the Bowie, Maryland-based company she runs with her husband, Porcelain Tub Restoration. These videos led to many of Mason's fans posting negative reviews online for that company. On several occasions, Mason has made guest appearances on the Drunken Peasants Podcast.

In July 2020, Mason had several of his videos on YouTube debunking COVID-19 conspiracy theories falsely flagged and taken down.

=== Creationism ===
Through his YouTube account Thunderf00t, Mason produced a series of videos titled "Why do people laugh at creationists?", focusing primarily on Kent Hovind's arguments in public seminars. Sociologist Richard Cimino has described the tone of these videos as "that of the professional, well-educated, and articulate British academic expert exposing—in voiceover—the irrational behavior and attitudes of the believer." Mason (originally known only as Thunderf00t) debated with VenomFangX, a YouTube blogger who supports creationism, in a series of public exchanges that lasted almost two years. The series also covered other creationists, such as Ray Comfort and intelligent design proponent Casey Luskin.
