= Smart highway =

Roads with embedded electronics

Smart highways and smart roads are highways and roads that incorporate electronic technologies. They are used to improve the operation of connected and autonomous vehicles (CAVs), for traffic lights and street lighting, and for monitoring the condition of the road, as well as traffic levels and the speed of vehicles.

== Intelligent transportation systems ==
Intelligent transportation systems usually refer to the use of information and communication technologies (rather than innovations in the construction of the roadway) in the field of road transport, infrastructure, vehicles, and users, and in traffic management and mobility management, as well as for interfaces with other modes of transportation.

== Solar road panels ==
=== Purpose ===
The principal idea of solar road panels is to utilize the space occupied by the roads to generate electricity via photovoltaic panels installed in place of a conventional concrete or asphalt road surface. Other functions for solar road panels have since then been proposed. One proposition is its use to power LED lights for creating dynamic road markings, such as lane markings, or warning messages such as “Reduce Speed” signs. Another function that has been proposed is using it to power heating elements that produce sufficient energy to clear ice and snow from roadways. It has also been suggested that they could power wireless charging technology to recharge the batteries of electric vehicles that drive over the panels.

=== Criticism ===
Critics have highlighted that solar roads would be more expensive, due to the cost of panels and the required extensive maintenance associated. Furthermore, they have argued they are less productive than more conventional forms of solar power infrastructure, as the panels cannot be angled towards the Sun, requiring thicker glass to withstand the weight of traffic and lack of cooling of the panels.

=== Tests ===
An experimental 1-kilometer road in France called Wattway, the longest solar road in the world, inaugurated in December 2016 by Segolene Royal, the Minister of the Environment, fell apart by August 2018. Described as a fiasco by Le Monde, it produced half of the electricity expected, created bothersome noises from traffic, and deteriorated substantially over two years.

== Vehicle charging ==
=== Conductive ===
Electric road technologies which power and charge electric vehicles while driving were assessed in Sweden from 2013. The assessment was scheduled to conclude in 2022. The first standard for electrical equipment on board a vehicle powered by a rail electric road system (ERS), CENELEC Technical Standard 50717, has been approved in late 2022. Following standards, encompassing "full interoperability" and a "unified and interoperable solution" for ground-level power supply, are scheduled to be published by the end 2024, detailing complete "specifications for communication and power supply through conductive rails embedded in the road". The first permanent electric road in Sweden is planned to be completed by 2026 on a section of the E20 route between Hallsberg and Örebro, followed by an expansion of further 3000 kilometers of electric roads by 2045.

=== Inductive ===
The Online Electric Vehicle developed by KAIST, the Korea Advanced Institute of Science and Technology, uses inductive vehicle charging. Its system has inductive coils built into the road that delivers power to receivers mounted on the underside of electric vehicles. Commercialization of the technology has not been successful, leading to a controversy over the continued public funding of the technology in 2019. The German company IAV developed similar technology in 2009. As of 2021, companies such as Magment and Electreon were developing dynamic inductive coil charging technologies. IPT Technology was also developing a system that uses inductive rails instead of coils, as the current standards which use coils that were deemed "extremely expensive" for dynamic charging, according to its CEO.

== Usage for road markings ==
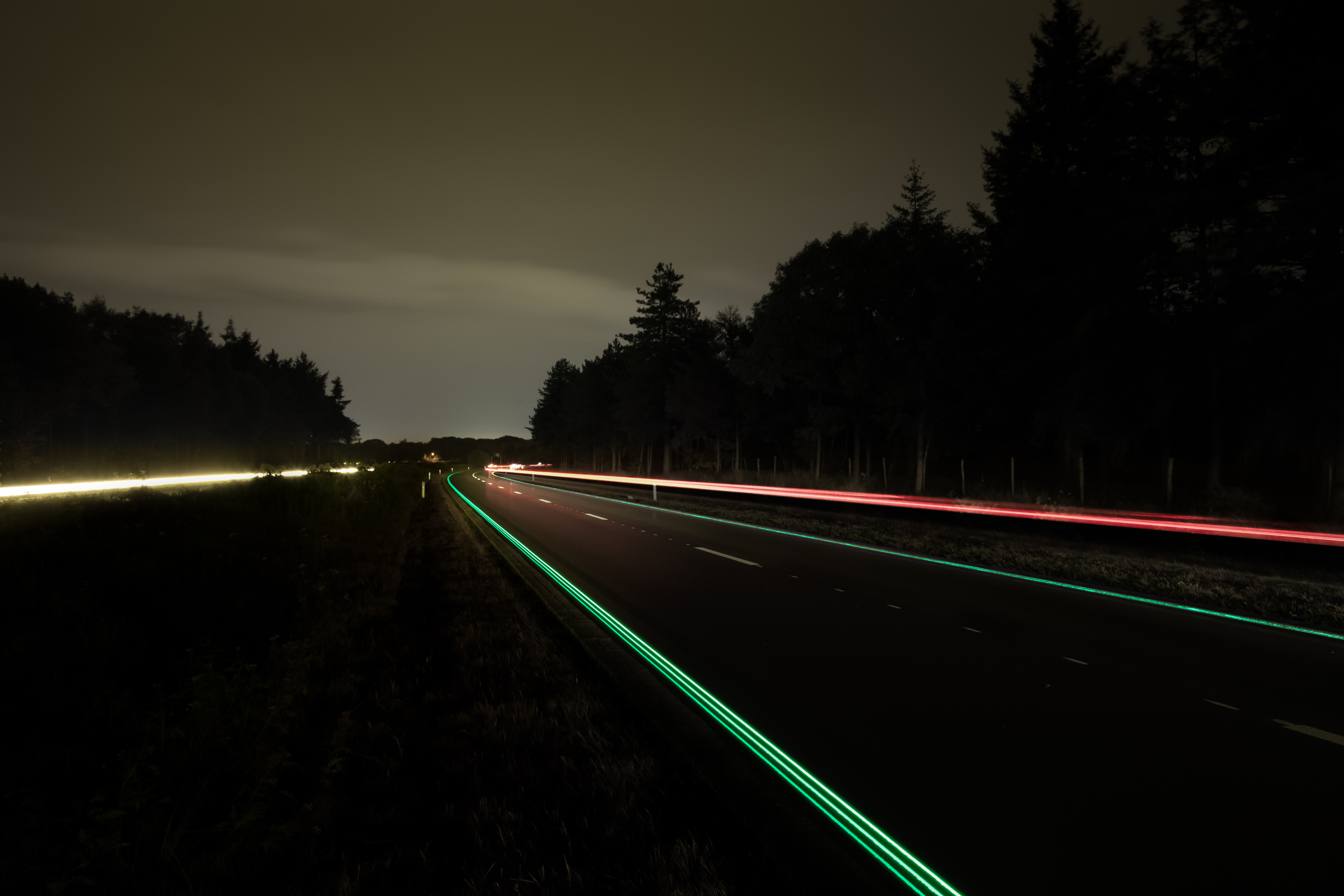
Glowing Lines, Studio Roosegaarde

The Smart Highway concept developed by Studio Roosegaarde and the infrastructure management group Heijmans in the Netherlands incorporated photo-luminescent paint for road markings, which absorb light during the day then glow for a period up to 10 hours. In its first design, the Glowing Lines charge during the daytime and glows for several hours at night to create a positive highway experience and increase safety. In April 2014, a pilot stretch of highway in Brabant, Netherlands was officially opened, demonstrating the technology. After two weeks, the paint had stopped glowing due to damage from moisture.

=== Frost protection and melting snow, ice ===
Snowmelt systems using electricity or hot water to heat roads and pavements have been installed in various locations.

Solar Roadways has proposed including a snowmelt system with their photovoltaic road panels, since the panels already have electrical power connections for harvesting photovoltaic power. Critics point to the very large energy requirements of such a system (much greater than the energy collected by the roadway in ideal conditions).

ICAX Limited of London's "Interseasonal Heat Capture" technology captures solar energy in thermal banks and releases it back under a roadway, heating it and keeping the asphalt free of ice.

== See also ==
- Autopilot
- Building information modeling
- Digital modeling and fabrication
- Open hardware
- Open Design Alliance
