= Solar Roadways =

American company

Solar Roadways Inc
- Type: Startup
- Founded: 2006
- Founder: Scott Brusaw; Julie Brusaw
- Headquarters: 721 Pine Street, Sandpoint, Idaho 83864, United States
- Website: solarroadways.com

Solar Roadways Incorporated is an American company based in Sandpoint, Idaho, aiming to develop solar-powered road panels to form a smart highway. Their proof-of-concept technology is a hexagonal road panel that has a glass driving surface with underlying solar cells, electronics, and sensors to act as a part of solar array with programmable capability. The concept has been widely criticized as unfeasible and uneconomical as either a road surface or a photovoltaic system.

== History ==
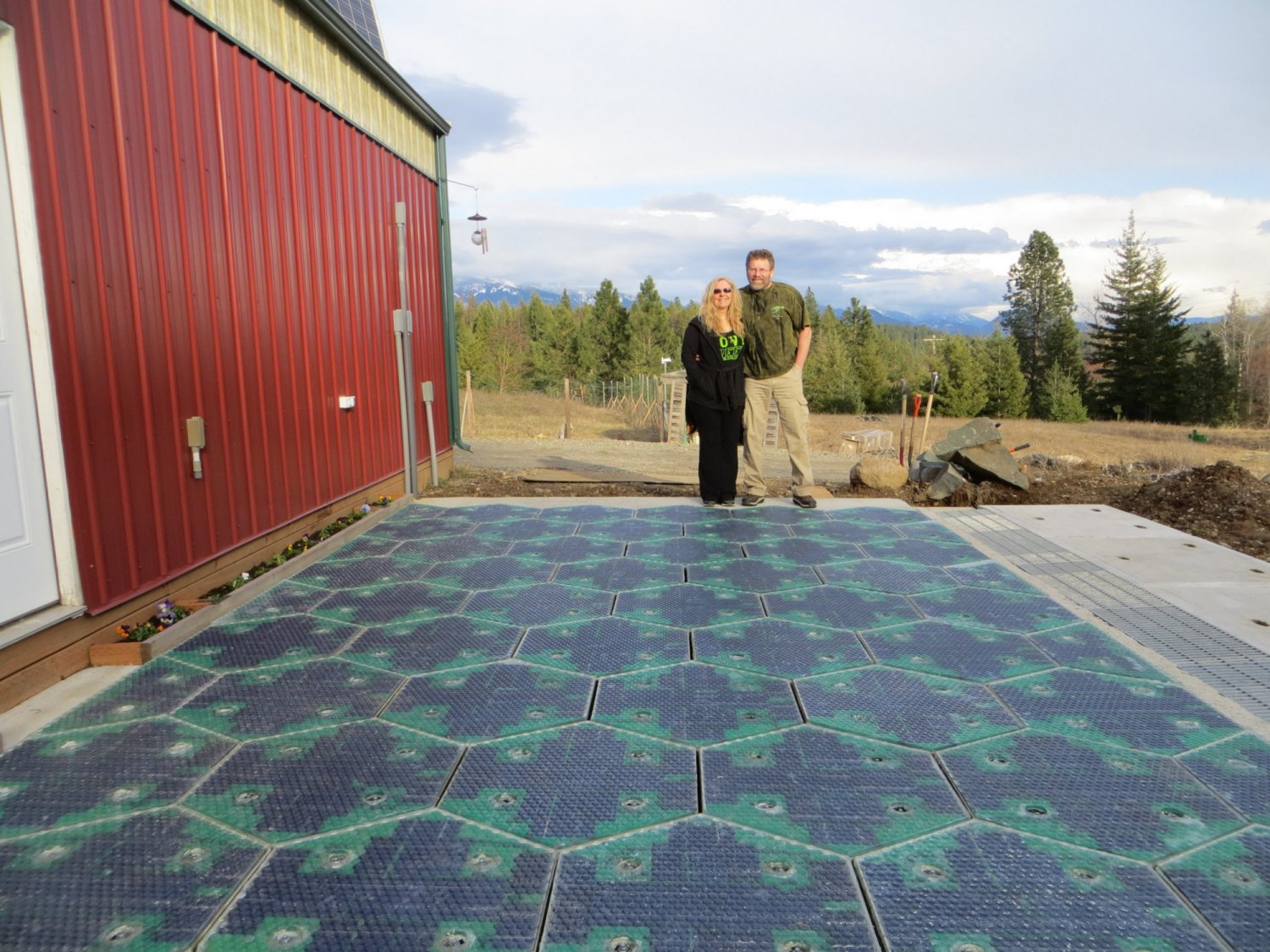
Solar Roadway panel prototypes

The company was founded in 2006 by Scott and Julie Brusaw, with Scott as President and CEO. They envisioned replacing asphalt surfaces with structurally engineered solar panels capable of withstanding vehicular traffic. The proposed system would require the development of strong, transparent, and self-cleaning glass with the necessary traction and impact-resistance properties at competitive cost.

In 2009, Solar Roadways received a $100,000 Small Business Innovation Research (SBIR) grant from the United States Department of Transportation (USDOT) for Phase I to determine the feasibility of the proposed project. In 2011, Solar Roadways received a $750,000 SBIR grant from the DOT for Phase II to develop and build a solar parking lot; from this, they built a 12-by-36-foot (3.7 by 11.0 m) parking lot covered with hexagonal glass-covered solar panels sitting on top of a concrete base, heated to prevent snow and ice accumulation, with LEDs to illuminate road lines and display messages. According to the Brusaws, the panels can sustain a 250,000 lb (110,000 kg) load.

In April 2014, the company started a crowdfunding drive at Indiegogo to raise money so they could get the product into production. The campaign raised $2.2 million and became Indiegogo’s most popular campaign ever in terms of the number of backers it attracted. The success was attributed in part to a tweet made by actor George Takei, due to his more than 8 million followers. One of the Brusaws’ videos went viral, with over 20 million views as of November 2015. In December 2015, the USDOT announced that it had awarded Solar Roadways a Phase IIB SBIR contract to further their research. In 2016 they were given an additional $750,000.

The first public installation was in Jeff Jones Town Square in Sandpoint, Idaho. It opened to the public on September 30, 2016, as a pilot installation for a pedestrian walkway. This installation consists of 30 Solar Roadways SR3 panels, covering an area of roughly 150 square feet (14 m^{2}). The cost of this installation was roughly $60,000, with the majority of the money coming from a grant from the Idaho Department of Commerce ($47,134), and a $10,000 grant from the Sandpoint Urban Renewal Agency. A webcam was installed to broadcast a view of the installation. The 30 tiles in Sandpoint generated power which was fed into the electricity meter at Jeff Jones Town Square, averaging around ¼ kWh per day during their most productive month, August 2018. For comparison, a typical home solar panel produces 1.45 kWh per typical day.

In December 2018, Solar Roadways shut down the SR3 pilot installation in Sandpoint after some problems started to emerge. LEDs in certain colors started to fade unexpectedly, and snow caused problems for the heating elements because of the metal strips which cover the gap between the panels. Scott Brusaw said Solar Roadways would install their newest SR4 prototype in 2019 at no cost to the city. SR4 is due to have rubber strips to mitigate problems with heat distribution.

In June 2019, Solar Roadways announced a second pilot installation in Baltimore, Maryland. It will be a 36-panel display of the new SR4 model installed at the Inner Harbor tourist destination. The company has also made a deal with a manufacturer to increase production which was limited to three panels per day.

== Criticism ==
In 2014, Jonathan Levine, a professor of urban planning at the University of Michigan, expressed doubt regarding the political feasibility of the project on a national scale. He suggested, however, that a single town might be able to deploy the concept in a limited test case such as a parking lot.

Journalist David Biello, writing in Scientific American in July 2014, noted the difficulties of the project in dealing with material limitations, particularly in its choice of making the surface of the panels from glass, which "must be tempered, self-cleaning, and capable of transmitting light to the PV below under trying conditions, among other characteristics—a type of glass that does not yet exist."

Sebastian Anthony noted in ExtremeTech in May 2014 that the cost to replace all roads in the United States with Solar Roadways panels would come to approximately $56 trillion, based on Scott Brusaw's cost estimate of $10,000 for a 12-by-12-foot (3.7 m × 3.7 m) section. The USDOT announcement of Phase IIB funding in December 2015 mentioned that because the solar cells were still manufactured by hand, they were "very costly to produce".

Phil Mason, a British chemist who runs a YouTube vlog, made a similar argument about cost in June 2014 adding his doubts about traction on a glass surface. Solar Roadways conducted its own lab tests using a British Pendulum Skid Resistance Tester and said that the results suggested that the texture was "sufficient to stop a vehicle going 80 mph (130 km/h) on a wet surface in the required distance". US Department of Transportation engineer Eric Weaver commented on those tests in August 2014, saying, "We can't say that it would be safe for roadway vehicular traffic. Further field-traffic evaluation is needed to determine safety and durability performance."

== List of awards and honors ==
- 2010 General Electric Ecomagination Community Award of $50,000.
- 2014 Popular Science. One of 7 "Best of What's New" Engineering category in the "100 Greatest Innovations of the Year-2014" article.

== See also ==
- Photovoltaic system
- Solar roads
- Asphalt concrete
- SolaRoad – the world's first bike path made from solar panels
- Snowmelt system – systems for automatically clearing snow from roads
- Tourouvre - where the first photovoltaic road in the world was under construction in November–December 2016
