= Index of New Mexico–related articles =

The location of the state of New Mexico in the United States of America

The following is an alphabetical list of articles related to the U.S. state of New Mexico.

== 0–9 ==
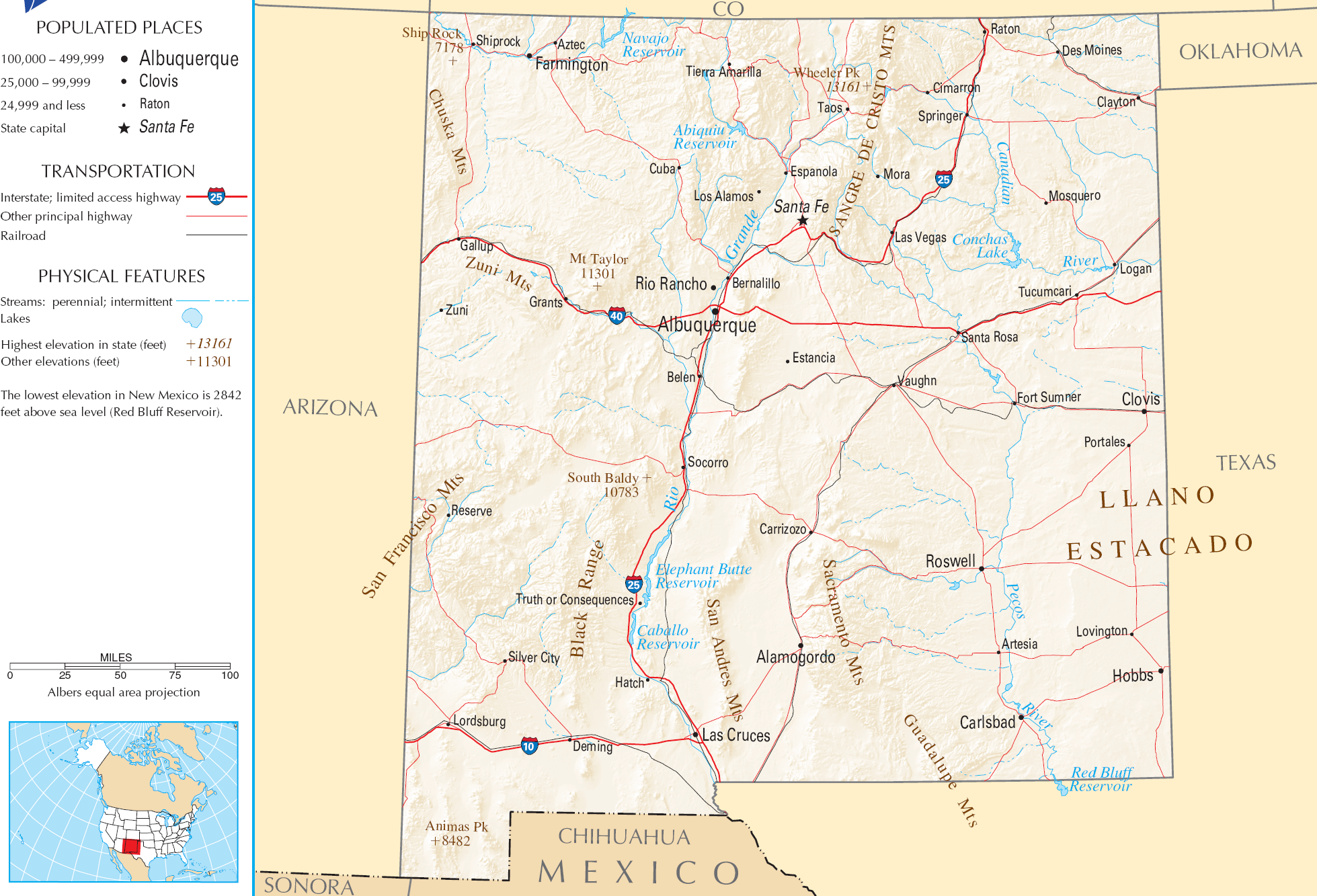
An enlargeable map of the state of New Mexico

- .nm.us – Internet second-level domain for the state of New Mexico
- 4 Corners
  - Four Corners Monument
- 32nd meridian west from Washington
- 32nd parallel north
- 33rd parallel north
- 34th parallel north
- 35th parallel north
- 36th parallel north
- 37th parallel north
- 103rd meridian west
- 104th meridian west
- 105th meridian west
- 106th meridian west
- 107th meridian west
- 108th meridian west
- 109th meridian west

== A ==
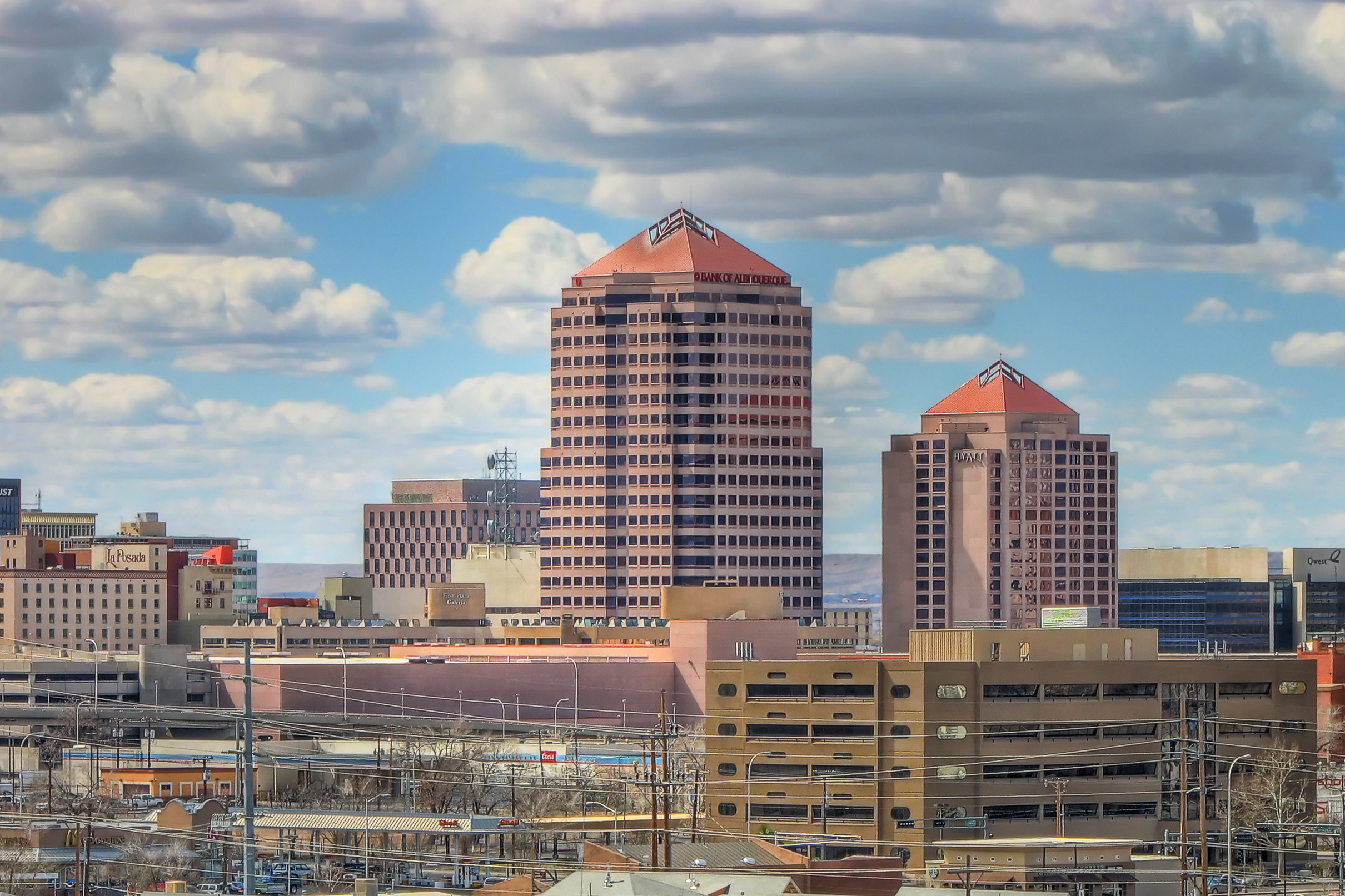
Albuquerque, New Mexico

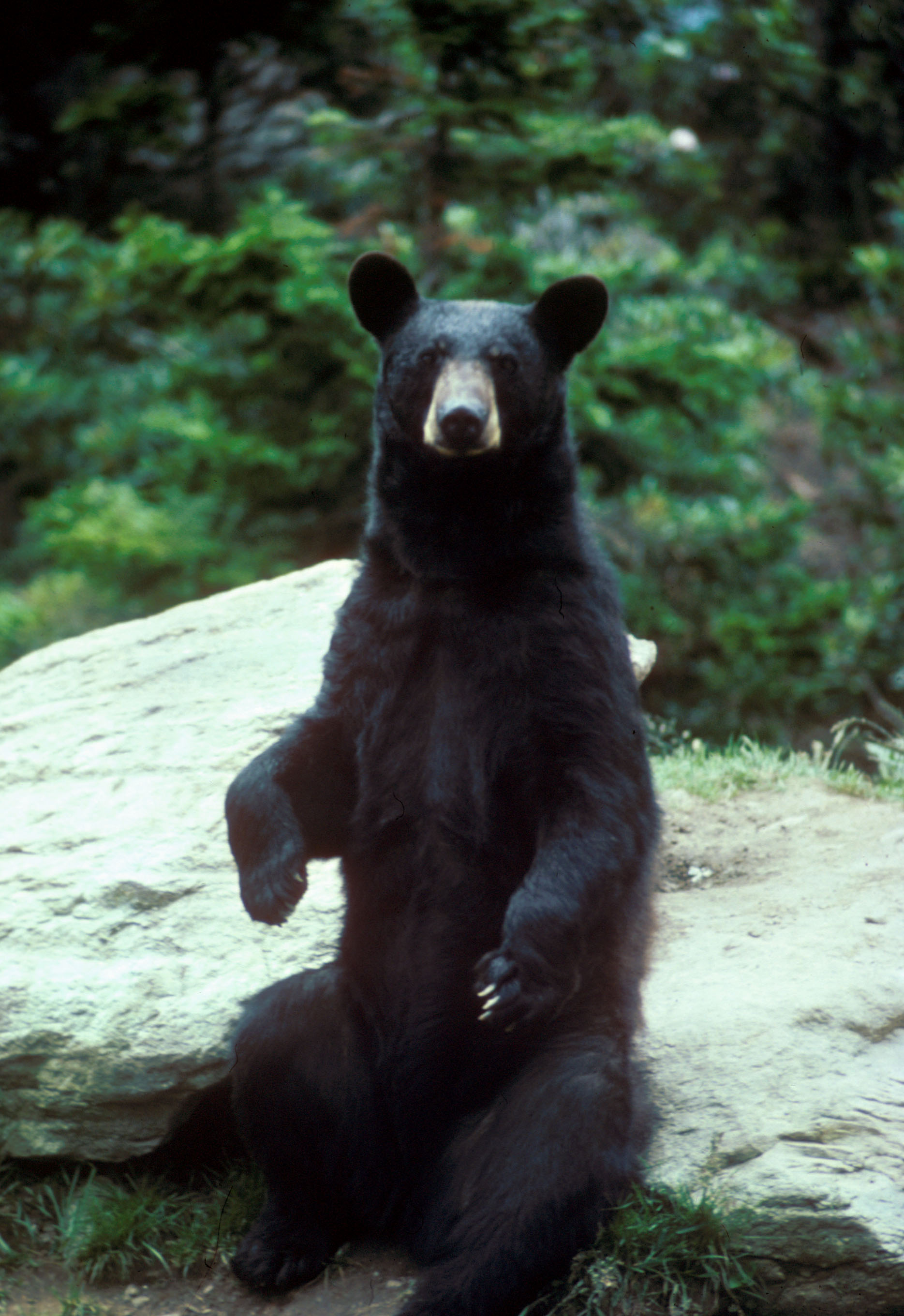
American black bear

- Abortion in New Mexico
- A Nuevo México
- Acoma Pueblo website
- Adams-Onís Treaty of 1819
- Adjacent states:
  - Estado Libre y Soberano de Chihuahua
  - Estado Libre y Soberano de Sonora
  - State of Arizona
  - State of Colorado
  - State of Oklahoma
  - State of Texas
  - State of Utah
- Agriculture in New Mexico
- Airports in New Mexico
- Alameda Park Zoo
- Alamo Bend Navajo Indian Reservation
- Alamogordo, New Mexico
- Alamogordo Daily News
- Alamogordo Public Library
- Albuquerque, New Mexico
- Albuquerque International Balloon Fiesta
- Albuquerque the Magazine
- Aldo Leopold Wilderness
- American black bear
- Amphibians in New Mexico
- Ancestral Puebloans (Native American)
- Apache Nation (Native American)
- Aquaria in New Mexico
  - commons:Category:Aquaria in New Mexico
- Arboreta in New Mexico
  - commons:Category:Arboreta in New Mexico
- Archaeology of New Mexico
  - Category:Archaeological sites in New Mexico
    - commons:Category:Archaeological sites in New Mexico
- Architecture of New Mexico
- Art museums and galleries in New Mexico
  - commons:Category:Art museums and galleries in New Mexico
- Artists of New Mexico
- Así Es Nuevo Méjico lyrics
- Astronomical observatories in New Mexico
  - commons:Category:Astronomical observatories in New Mexico
- Atchison, Topeka and Santa Fe Railway
- Aztec Ruins National Monument

== B ==
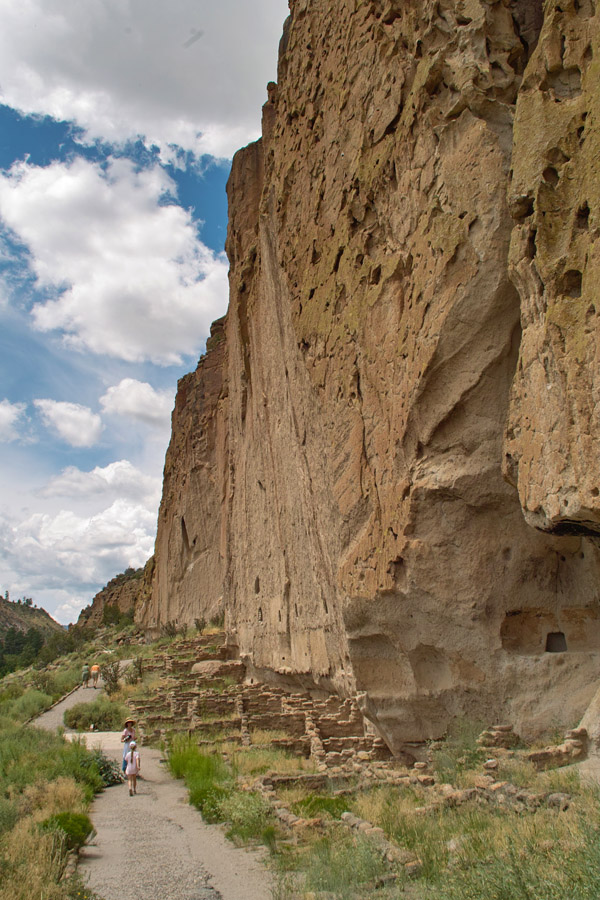
Bandelier National Monument

- Bandelier National Monument
- Basilica of San Albino
- Battle of Albuquerque
- Battle of Cañada
- Battle of Canada Alamosa
- Battle of Cookes Canyon
- Battle of Embudo Pass
- Battle of the Florida Mountains
- Battle of Glorieta Pass
- Battle of Mount Gray
- Battle of Peralta
- Battle of Pinos Altos
- Battle of Placito
- Battle of Valverde
- Biscochito
- Bisti/De-Na-Zin Wilderness
- Bitter Lake National Wildlife Refuge
- Bizcochito
- Blue Grama
- Blue Range Wilderness
- Bolo tie
- Bosque del Apache National Wildlife Refuge
- Botanical gardens in New Mexico
  - commons:Category:Botanical gardens in New Mexico
- Bouteloua gracilis
- Bridges in New Mexico
  - List of bridges on the National Register of Historic Places in New Mexico
- Buildings and structures in New Mexico
  - commons:Category:Buildings and structures in New Mexico

== C ==
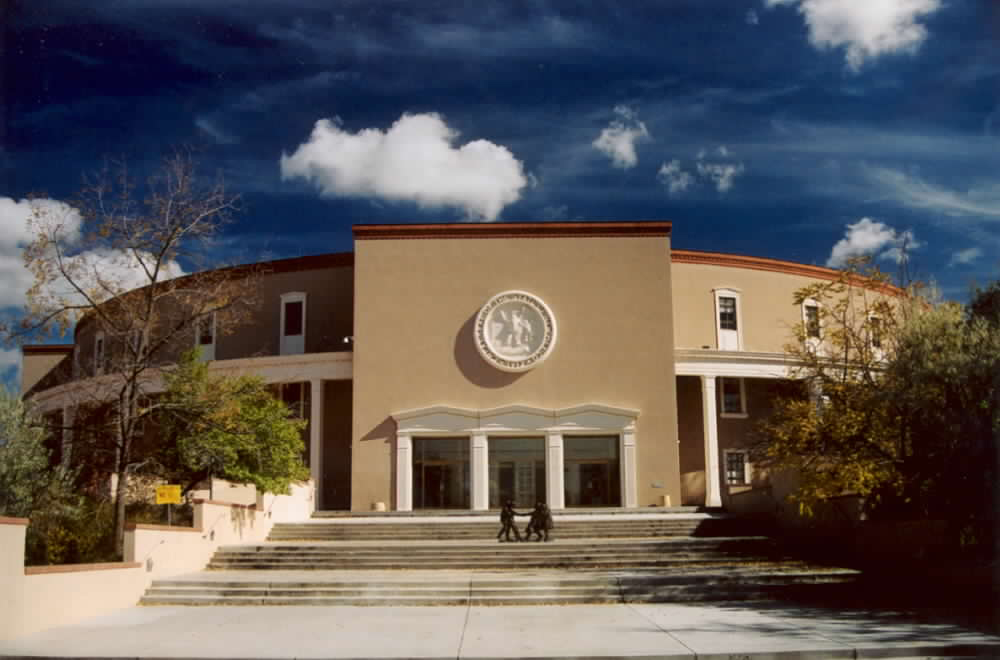
The New Mexico State Capitol in Santa Fe

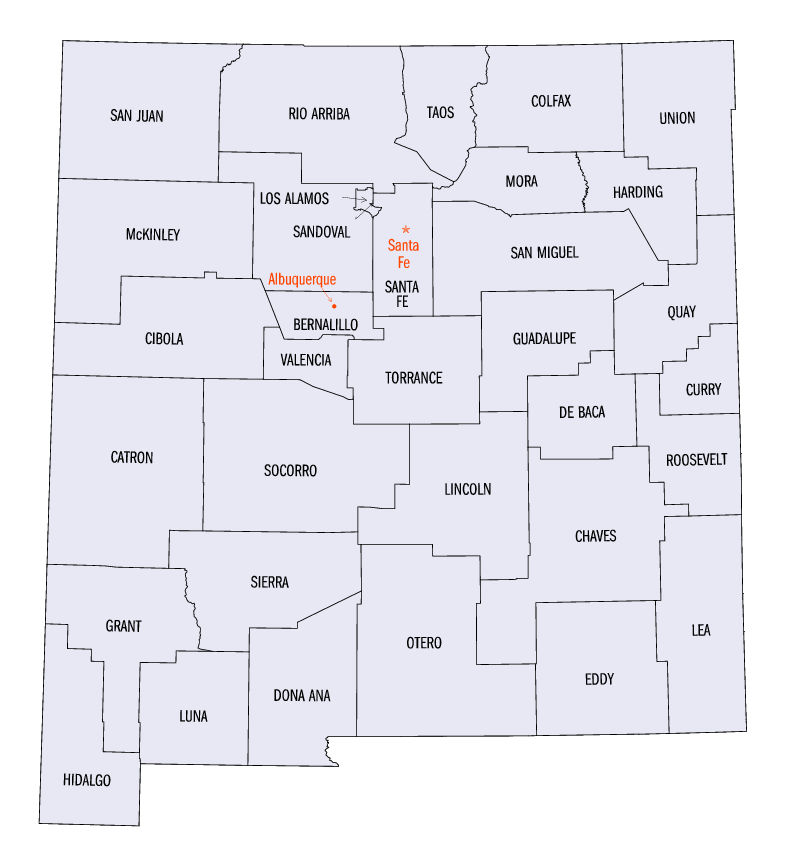
An enlargeable map of the 33 counties of the State of New Mexico

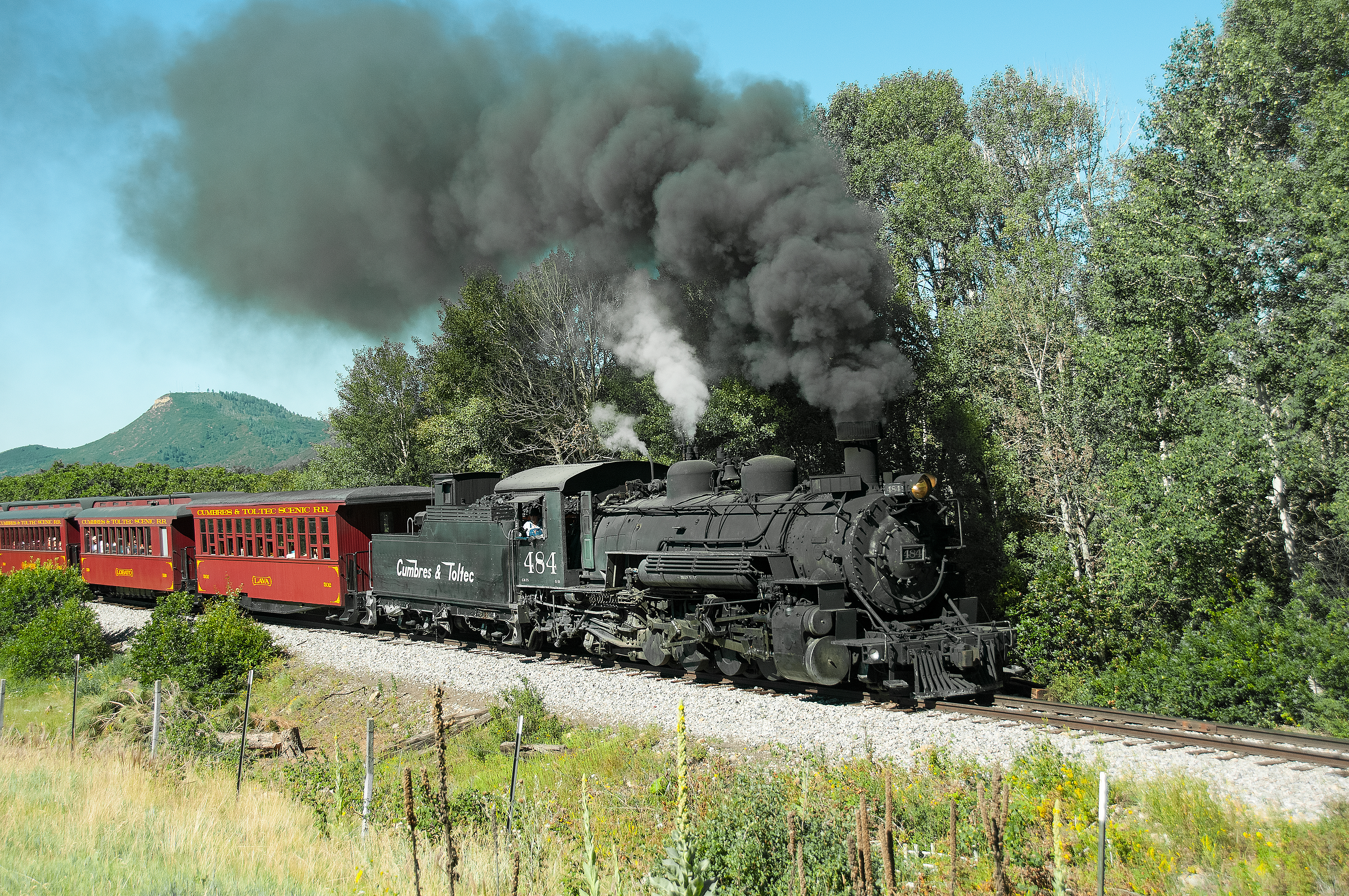
The Cumbres and Toltec Scenic Railroad

- Cabañuelas
- Callophrys mcfarlandi
- Capital of the State of New Mexico
- Capitol of the State of New Mexico
- Capulin Volcano National Monument
- Carlsbad Caverns National Park
- Carlsbad Caverns Wilderness
- Carson National Forest
- Casinos in New Mexico
- Caves of New Mexico
  - commons:Category:Caves of New Mexico
- Census statistical areas in New Mexico
- Chaco Culture National Historical Park
- Chile con frijoles
- Chili pepper
- Cibola National Forest
- Cicuye Pueblo
- Cienega affair
- Cimarron Range
- Cimarron River
- Cnemidophorus neomexicanus
- Pueblo de Cochiti website
- Coelophysis bauri
- Colorado Plateau
- Comanche Nation (Native American)
- Communications in New Mexico
  - commons:Category:Communications in New Mexico
- Confederate Territory of Arizona, 1861–1865
- Coronado y Luján, Francisco Vásquez de
- Counties of the State of New Mexico
  - commons:Category:Counties in New Mexico
- Cuisine of New Mexico
- Culebra Range
- Culture of New Mexico
  - Category:Culture of New Mexico
    - commons:Category:New Mexico culture
- Crime in New Mexico
- Cumbres and Toltec Scenic Railroad website

== D ==
- Dams in New Mexico
- Demographics of New Mexico
  - Category:Demographics of New Mexico
- Denver and Rio Grande Railroad
- Dinétah - traditional homeland of the Diné in northwestern New Mexico

== E ==
- Economy of New Mexico
  - Category:Economy of New Mexico
    - commons:Category:Economy of New Mexico
- Education in New Mexico
  - Category:Education in New Mexico
    - commons:Category:Education in New Mexico
- Eight Northern Pueblos
- El Malpais National Monument
- El Morro National Monument
- El Paso del Norte
- El Rito Presbyterian Church
- Category:Elections in New Mexico
  - commons:Category:Elections in New Mexico
- Category:Environment of New Mexico
  - commons:Category:Environment of New Mexico
- Estado de Nuevo México
- Everybody is somebody in New Mexico

== F ==
The Flag of the State of New Mexico

- Festivals in New Mexico
  - commons:Category:Festivals in New Mexico
- Fiestas de Santa Fe
- Films set in New Mexico
- First Battle of Mora
- Flag of the State of New Mexico
- Forts in New Mexico
  - Fort Union
  - Category:Forts in New Mexico
    - commons:Category:Forts in New Mexico
- Four Corners
  - Four Corners Monument

== G ==
The Great Seal of the State of New Mexico

- Gadsden Purchase of 1853
- Gallina
- Gallinas massacre
- Geococcyx californianus
- Geography of New Mexico
  - Category:Geography of New Mexico
    - commons:Category:Geography of New Mexico
- Geology of New Mexico
  - commons:Category:Geology of New Mexico
- Ghost towns in New Mexico
  - Category:Ghost towns in New Mexico
    - commons:Category:Ghost towns in New Mexico
- Gila Cliff Dwellings National Monument
- Gila National Forest
- Gila Wilderness
- Government of the State of New Mexico website
  - Category:Government of New Mexico
    - commons:Category:Government of New Mexico
- Governor of the state of New Mexico
  - List of governors of the Spanish colony of New Mexico
  - List of governors of the Mexican territory of New Mexico
  - List of governors of the U.S. territory of New Mexico
  - List of governors of the U.S. state of New Mexico
- Great Seal of the State of New Mexico
- Greater roadrunner
- Grulla National Wildlife Refuge

== H ==
- Heritage railroads in New Mexico
  - commons:Category:Heritage railroads in New Mexico
- Highway routes in New Mexico
- Hiking trails in New Mexico
  - commons:Category:Hiking trails in New Mexico
- History of New Mexico
  - Historical outline of New Mexico
  - History of slavery in New Mexico
  - Territorial evolution of New Mexico
  - New Mexico Territory
  - Category:History of New Mexico
  - commons:Category:History of New Mexico
  - U.S. provisional government of New Mexico
- Hopi Nation (Native American)
- Hospitals in New Mexico
- Hot air balloon
- Hot springs of New Mexico
  - commons:Category:Hot springs of New Mexico

== I ==
- Images of New Mexico
  - commons:Category:New Mexico
- Indian Pueblo Cultural Center website
- Insignia of the State of New Mexico
- Islands in New Mexico
- Isleta Pueblo (Shiewhibak) website

== J ==
- Jemez Pueblo website
- Jicarilla Apache

== K ==
- Kasha-Katuwe Tent Rocks National Monument
- Keresan languages
- Kiowa National Grassland
- Tanoan languages

== L ==
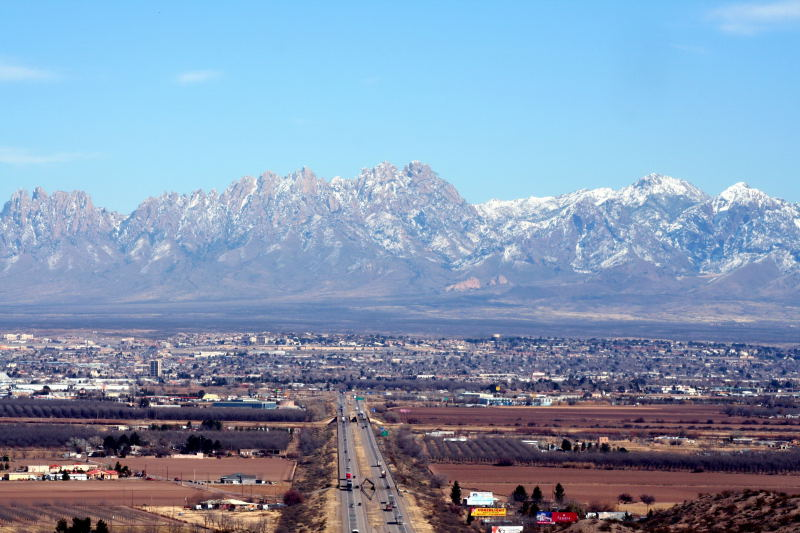
Las Cruces, New Mexico

- La Fonda on the Plaza
- La Villa Real de la Santa Fé de San Francisco de Asís, colonial capital 1610-1680 and 1692–1821, provincial capital 1621-1846
- Laguna Pueblo website
- Lakes of New Mexico
  - commons:Category:Lakes of New Mexico
- Land grants in New Mexico
- Land of Enchantment
- Land of Enchantment lyrics
- Landmarks in New Mexico
  - commons:Category:Landmarks in New Mexico
- Languages of New Mexico
- Las Cruces
- Latir Peak Wilderness
- Lincoln National Forest
- Lists related to the State of New Mexico:
  - List of airports in New Mexico
  - List of amphibians in New Mexico
  - List of bridges on the National Register of Historic Places in New Mexico
  - List of census statistical areas in New Mexico
  - List of cities in New Mexico
  - List of colleges and universities in New Mexico
  - List of counties in New Mexico
  - List of New Mexico counties by socioeconomic factors
  - List of dams and reservoirs in New Mexico
  - List of forts in New Mexico
  - List of ghost towns in New Mexico
  - List of governors of the Spanish colony of New Mexico
  - List of governors of the Mexican territory of New Mexico
  - List of governors of the U.S. territory of New Mexico
  - List of governors of the U.S. state of New Mexico
  - List of high schools in New Mexico
  - List of highway routes in New Mexico
  - List of New Mexico state parks
  - List of hospitals in New Mexico
  - List of individuals executed in New Mexico
  - List of islands in New Mexico
  - List of lakes in New Mexico
  - List of law enforcement agencies in New Mexico
  - List of mountain ranges of New Mexico
  - List of museums in New Mexico
  - List of National Historic Landmarks in New Mexico
  - List of newspapers in New Mexico
  - List of people from New Mexico
  - List of power stations in New Mexico
  - List of radio stations in New Mexico
  - List of railroads in New Mexico
  - List of Registered Historic Places in New Mexico
  - List of rivers of New Mexico
  - List of school districts in New Mexico
  - List of state parks in New Mexico
  - List of state prisons in New Mexico
  - List of symbols of the State of New Mexico
  - List of television stations in New Mexico
  - List of New Mexico's congressional delegations
  - List of United States congressional districts in New Mexico
  - List of United States representatives from New Mexico
  - List of United States senators from New Mexico
  - List of valleys of New Mexico
- Louisiana Purchase of 1803

== M ==
- Maps of New Mexico
  - commons:Category:Maps of New Mexico
- Mass media in New Mexico
- Matachines
- Mescalero (Native American)
- Mesilla, Confederate Territory of Arizona, CSA territorial capital 1862
- Mi Lindo Nuevo Mexico lyrics
- Missions in New Mexico
- Mogollon culture Prehistoric Natives
- Monuments and memorials in New Mexico
  - commons:Category:Monuments and memorials in New Mexico
- Mountains of New Mexico
  - Mount Taylor
  - commons:Category:Mountains of New Mexico
- Museums in New Mexico
  - Category:Museums in New Mexico
    - commons:Category:Museums in New Mexico
- Music of New Mexico
  - commons:Category:Music of New Mexico
  - Category:Musical groups from New Mexico
  - Category:Musicians from New Mexico

== N ==
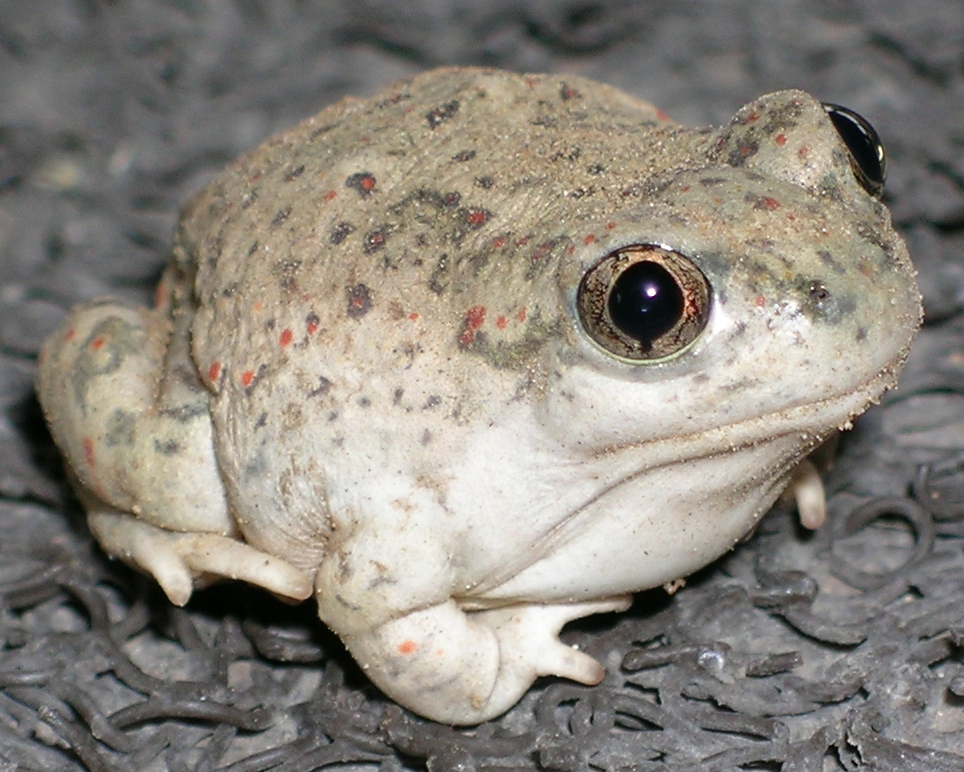
New Mexico spadefoot toad

- Nambé Pueblo website
- National forests of New Mexico
  - commons:Category:National Forests of New Mexico
- National monuments in New Mexico
- National Parks in New Mexico
- National Wilderness Areas of New Mexico
- National Wildlife Refuges in New Mexico
- Natural gas pipelines in New Mexico
- Natural history of New Mexico
  - commons:Category:Natural history of New Mexico
- Nature centers in New Mexico
  - commons:Category:Nature centers in New Mexico
- Navajo Nation (Native American)
- Navajo people
- Neomexicano
- New Mexico chile
- New Mexico music
- New Mexican cuisine
- New Mexican Spanish
- New Mexico website
  - Category:New Mexico
    - commons:Category:New Mexico
      - commons:Category:Maps of New Mexico
- New Mexico spadefoot toad
- New Mexico State Capitol
- New Mexico State Fair
- New Mexico State Police
- New Mexico State University
- New Mexico wine
- New Mexico whiptail
- Newspapers in New Mexico
- NM – United States Postal Service postal code for the State of New Mexico
- Nuevo México

== O ==
- O Fair New Mexico lyrics
- Ohkay Owingeh (O'ke Oweenge) website
- Old Spanish Trail
- Oñate Salazar, Juan de
- Oncorhynchus clarki virginalis
- Outdoor sculptures in New Mexico
  - commons:Category:Outdoor sculptures in New Mexico

== P ==
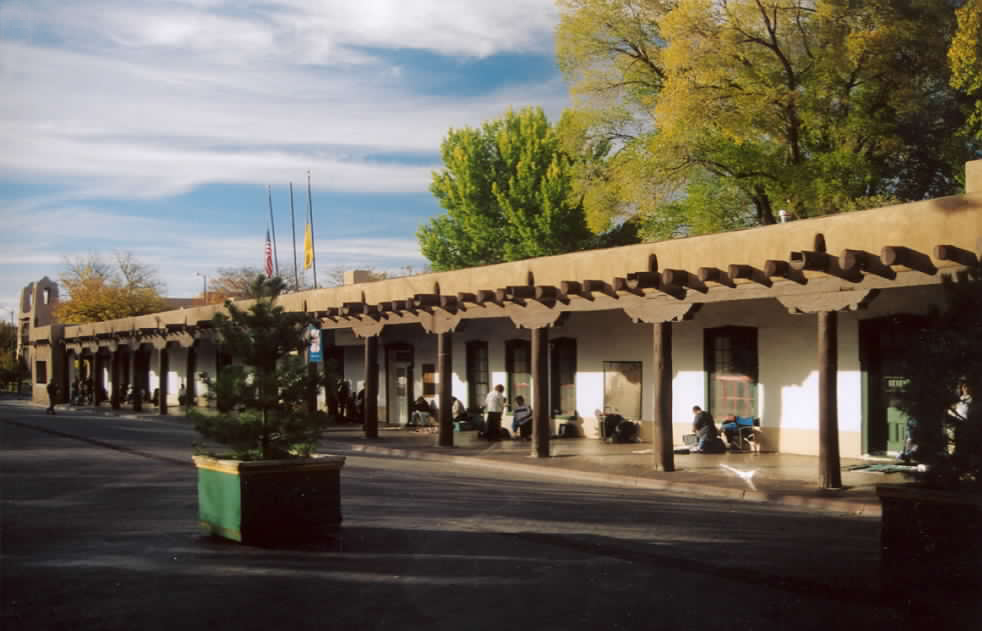
The Palace of the Governors in Santa Fe

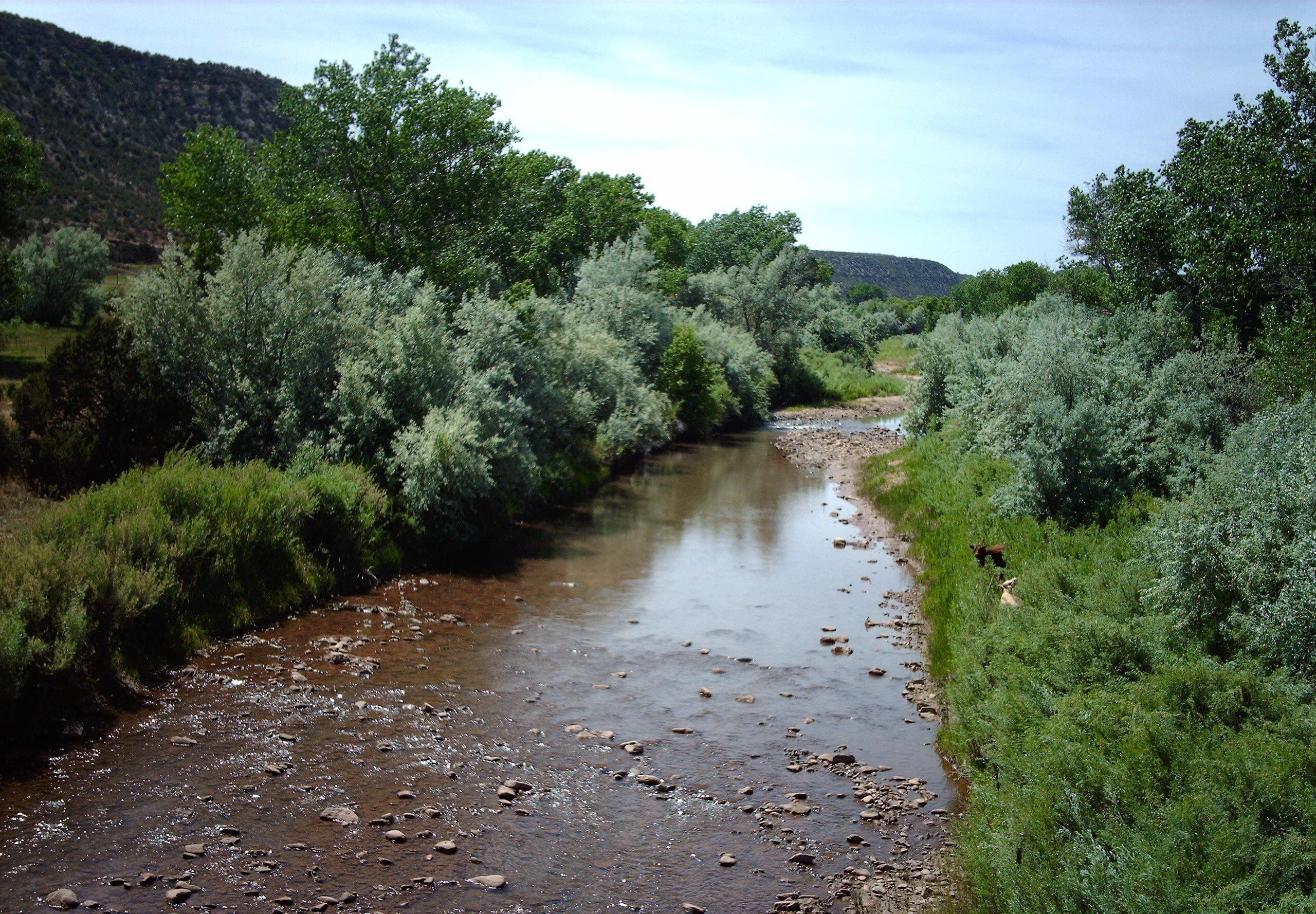
The Pecos River near Villanueva, New Mexico

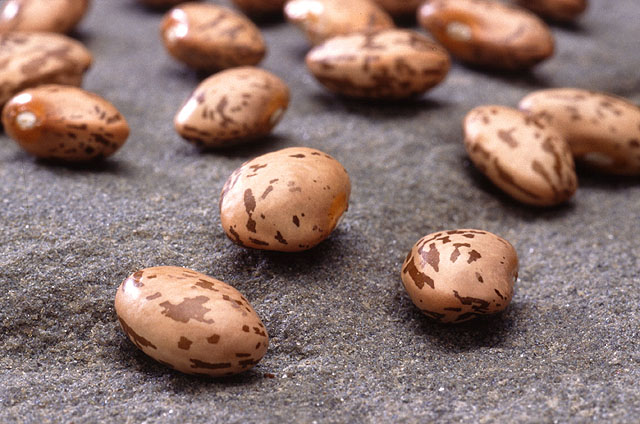
Pinto beans

- Palace of the Governors
- Pecos Pueblo
- Pecos River
- Pecos Wilderness
- Pedro de Peralta
- Penitentes
- People from New Mexico
  - Category:People from New Mexico
    - commons:Category:People from New Mexico
    - Category:People from New Mexico by populated place
    - Category:People from New Mexico by county
    - Category:People from New Mexico by occupation
- Pepsis grossa
- Peralta, Pedro de
- Petroglyph National Monument
- Picuris Pueblo website
- Pilabó Pueblo
- Piñon pine
- Pinto bean
- Pinus edulis
- Piro Nation (Native American)
- Pojoaque Pueblo website
- Politics of New Mexico
- Popé
- Protected areas of New Mexico
  - commons:Category:Protected areas of New Mexico
- Pueblo Revival Style architecture
- Pueblo Revolt
- Puebloan peoples (Native American)
- Pueblos in New Mexico: (Native American)
  - Acoma Pueblo website
  - Cicuye Pueblo abandoned
  - Pueblo de Cochiti website
  - Isleta Pueblo (Shiewhibak) website
  - Jemez Pueblo website
  - Laguna Pueblo website
  - Nambé Pueblo website
  - Ohkay Owingeh (O'ke Oweenge) website
  - Pecos Pueblo abandoned
  - Picuris Pueblo website
  - Pilabó Pueblo abandoned
  - Pojoaque Pueblo website
  - San Felipe Pueblo website
  - San Ildefonso Pueblo website
  - Sandia Pueblo (Nafiat) website
  - Santa Ana Pueblo website
  - Santa Clara Pueblo website
  - Santo Domingo Pueblo website
  - Senecú Pueblo abandoned
  - Taos Pueblo website
  - Tesuque Pueblo (Te Tsugeh Oweengeh) website
  - Teypana Pueblo abandoned
  - Zia Pueblo website
  - Zuñi Pueblo website
- Puyé Cliff Dwellings

== R ==
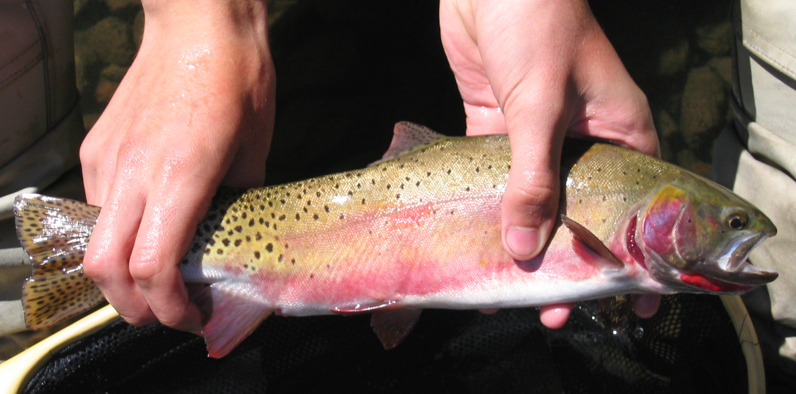
Rio Grande cutthroat trout

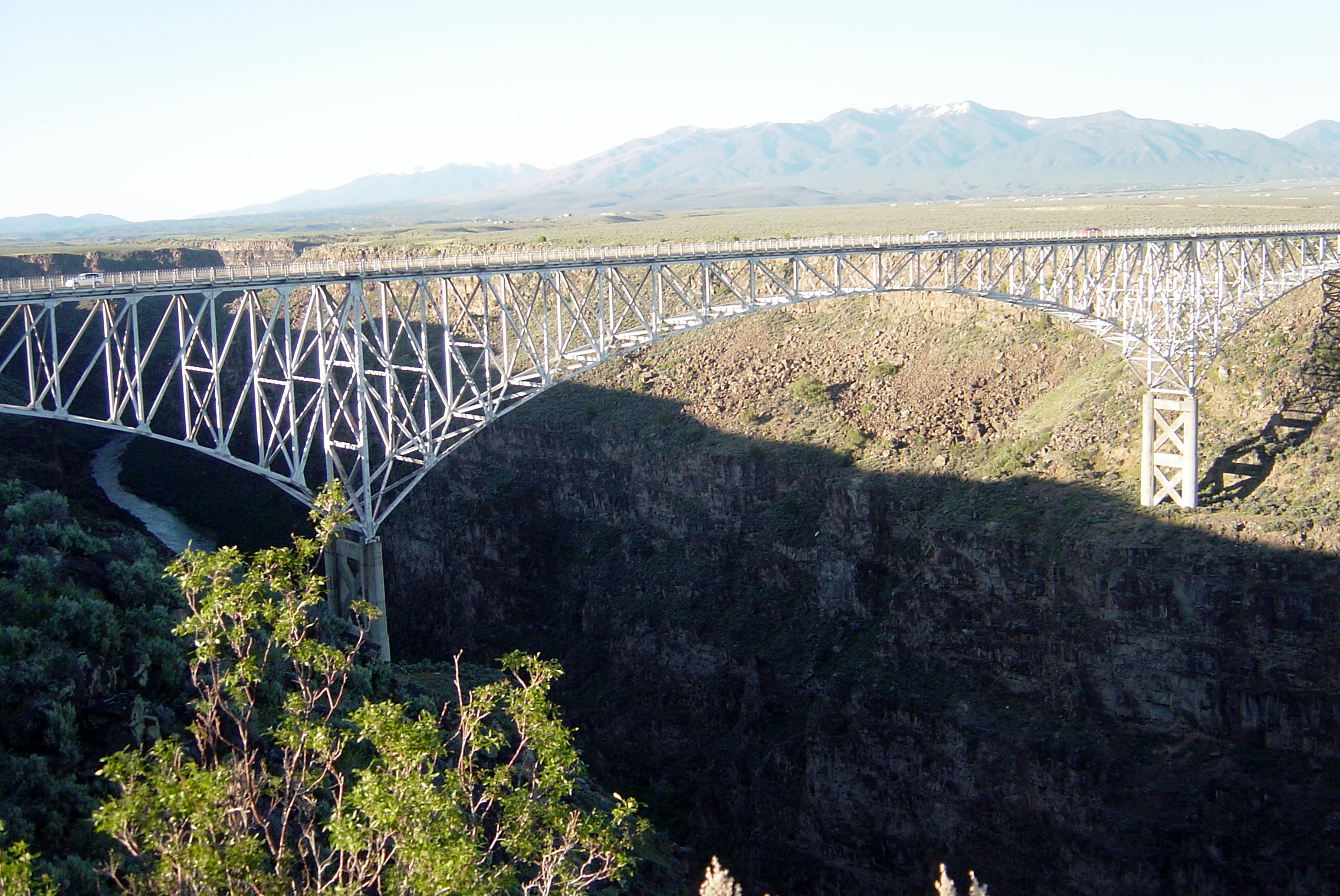
The Rio Grande Gorge Bridge

- Radio stations in New Mexico
- Railroad museums in New Mexico
  - commons:Category:Railroad museums in New Mexico
- Ramah Navajo Indian Reservation
- Red River Canyon affair
- Religion in New Mexico
  - Category:Religion in New Mexico
    - commons:Category:Religion in New Mexico
  - Category:Religious buildings and structures in New Mexico
- Rio Bravo del Norte
- Rio Chama
- Rio Grande
- Rio Grande cutthroat trout
- Rio Grande Gorge
- Rio Grande Gorge Bridge
- Rio Grande Railroad
- Rio San Juan
- Rivers in New Mexico
- Rock formations in New Mexico
  - commons:Category:Rock formations in New Mexico
- Rocky Mountains

== S ==
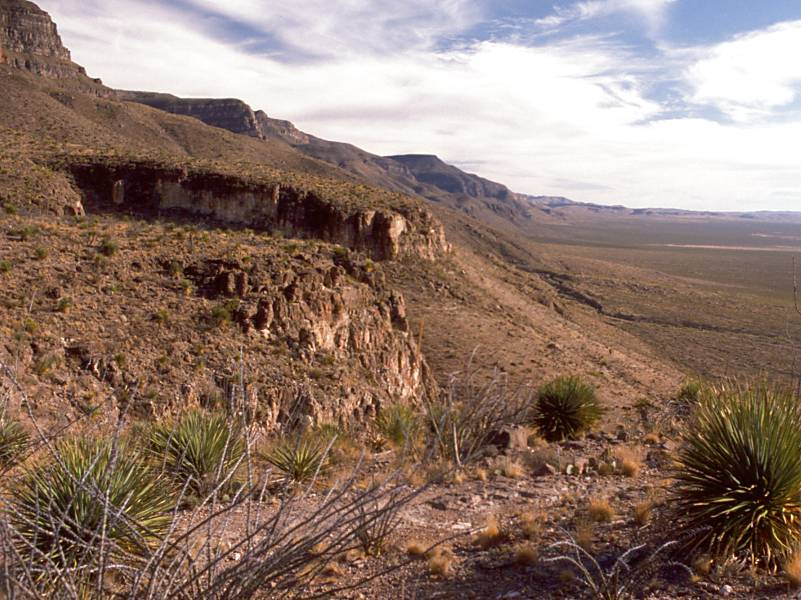
The Sacramento Mountains of southern New Mexico

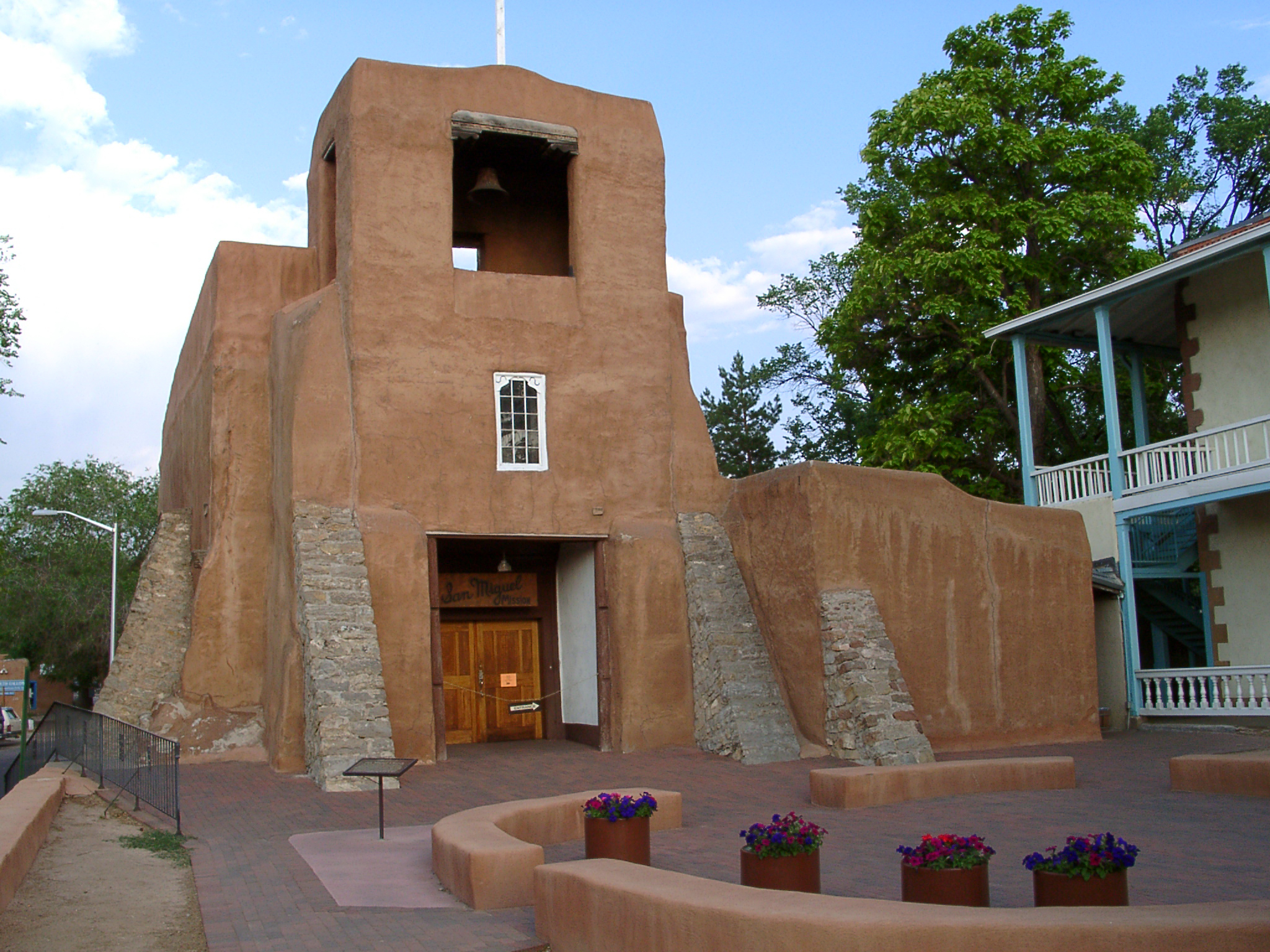
The San Miguel Mission in Santa Fe is the oldest extant church in the United States

- Sacramento Mountains
- Salinas Pueblo Missions National Monument
- San Felipe Pueblo website
- San Ildefonso Pueblo website
- San Juan de los Caballeros, first colonial capital 1598-1610
- San Juan Mountains
- San Juan River
- Sandia hairstreak butterfly
- Sandia Mountain Wilderness
- Sandia Pueblo (Nafiat) website
- Sangre de Cristo Mountains
- Santa Ana Pueblo website
- Santa Clara Pueblo website
- Santa Fé, colonial capital 1610-1680 and 1692–1821, provincial capital 1621–1846, military capital 1846–1848, provisional capital 1848–1850, territorial capital 1850–1912, and state capital since 1912
- Santa Fé de Nuevo Méjico, 1692–1821
- Santa Fé de Nuevo México, 1821–1848
- Santa Fe Mountains
- Santa Fe National Forest
- Santa Fe Railway
- Santa Fé Style
- Santa Fe Trail
- Santo
- Santo Domingo Pueblo website
- Scouting in New Mexico
- Second Battle of Mora
- Senecú Pueblo
- Settlements in New Mexico
  - Cities in New Mexico
  - Towns in New Mexico
  - Villages in New Mexico
  - Census Designated Places in New Mexico
  - Other unincorporated communities in New Mexico
  - List of ghost towns in New Mexico
- Siege of Pueblo de Taos
- Sierra Blanca
- Sierra Blanca Peak
- Ski areas and resorts in New Mexico
  - commons:Category:Ski areas and resorts in New Mexico
- Skirmish near Fort Thorn, New Mexico Territory
- Smokey Bear
- Soaptree Yucca
- Solar power in New Mexico
- Southern Pacific Railroad
- Southern Rocky Mountains
- Spaceport America
- Spea multiplicata
- Sports in New Mexico
  - commons:Category:Sports in New Mexico
- Sports venues in New Mexico
  - commons:Category:Sports venues in New Mexico
- State of New Mexico website
  - Government of the State of New Mexico
    - Category:Government of New Mexico
      - commons:Category:Government of New Mexico
- State Police of New Mexico
- State prisons in New Mexico
- Structures in New Mexico
  - commons:Category:Buildings and structures in New Mexico
- Superfund sites in New Mexico
- Symbols of the State of New Mexico: website
  - New Mexico state aircraft
  - New Mexico state amphibian
  - New Mexico state ballad
  - New Mexico state bird
  - New Mexico state butterfly
  - New Mexico state cookie
  - New Mexico state fish
  - New Mexico state flag
  - New Mexico state flower
  - New Mexico state fossil
  - New Mexico state gem
  - New Mexico state grass
  - New Mexico state historic railroad
  - New Mexico state insect
  - New Mexico state mammal
  - New Mexico state motto
  - New Mexico state neckwear
  - New Mexico state nickname
  - New Mexico state poem
  - New Mexico state question
  - New Mexico state reptile
  - New Mexico state seal
  - New Mexico state slogan
  - New Mexico state song (bilingual)
  - New Mexico state song (English)
  - New Mexico state song (Spanish)
  - New Mexico state tree
  - New Mexico state vegetables

== T ==
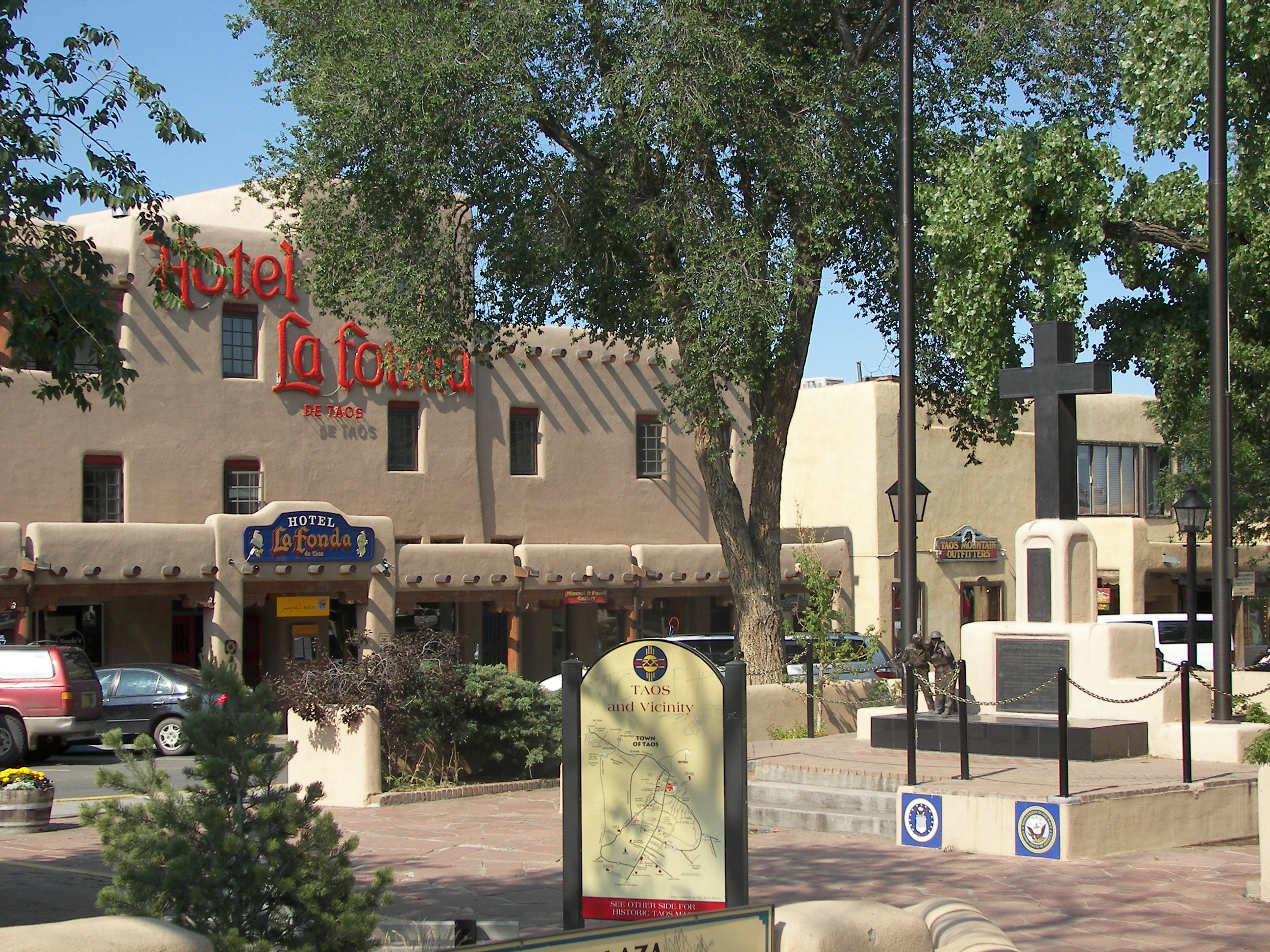
Plaza la Fonda in Taos

- Taos
- Taos Mountains
- Taos Pueblo website
- Tarantula hawk wasp
- Telecommunications in New Mexico
  - commons:Category:Communications in New Mexico
- Telephone area codes in New Mexico
- Television shows set in New Mexico
- Television stations in New Mexico
- Territory of Arizona (CSA), 1861–1865
- Territory of New Mexico, 1850–1912
- Tesuque Pueblo (Te Tsugeh Oweengeh) website
- Tewa language
- Teypana Pueblo
- Theatres in New Mexico
  - commons:Category:Theatres in New Mexico
- Tiwa languages
- Tiwa people
- Tohajiilee Indian Reservation
- Tourism in New Mexico website
  - commons:Category:Tourism in New Mexico
- Transportation in New Mexico
  - Category:Transportation in New Mexico
    - commons:Category:Transport in New Mexico
- Treaty of Guadalupe Hidalgo of 1848
- Truchas Peak
- Tsankawi
- Turquoise
- Two-needle Piñon

== U ==
- United States of America
  - States of the United States of America
  - United States census statistical areas of New Mexico
  - New Mexico's congressional delegations
  - United States congressional districts in New Mexico
  - United States Court of Appeals for the Tenth Circuit
  - United States District Court for the District of New Mexico
  - United States representatives from New Mexico
  - United States senators from New Mexico
- University of New Mexico
- Uranium mining in New Mexico
- Ursus americanus
- US-NM – ISO 3166-2:US region code for the State of New Mexico
- Ute Nation (Native American)

== V ==
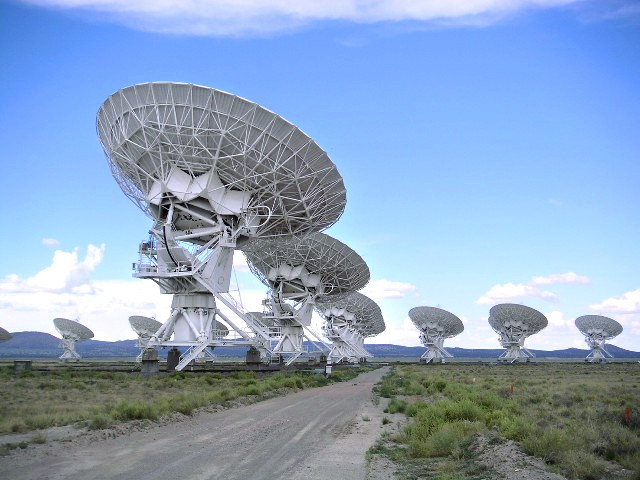
The Very Large Array

- Very Large Array
- Viceroyalty of New Spain
- La Villa Real de la Santa Fé de San Francisco de Asís
- Virreinato de la Nueva España

== W ==
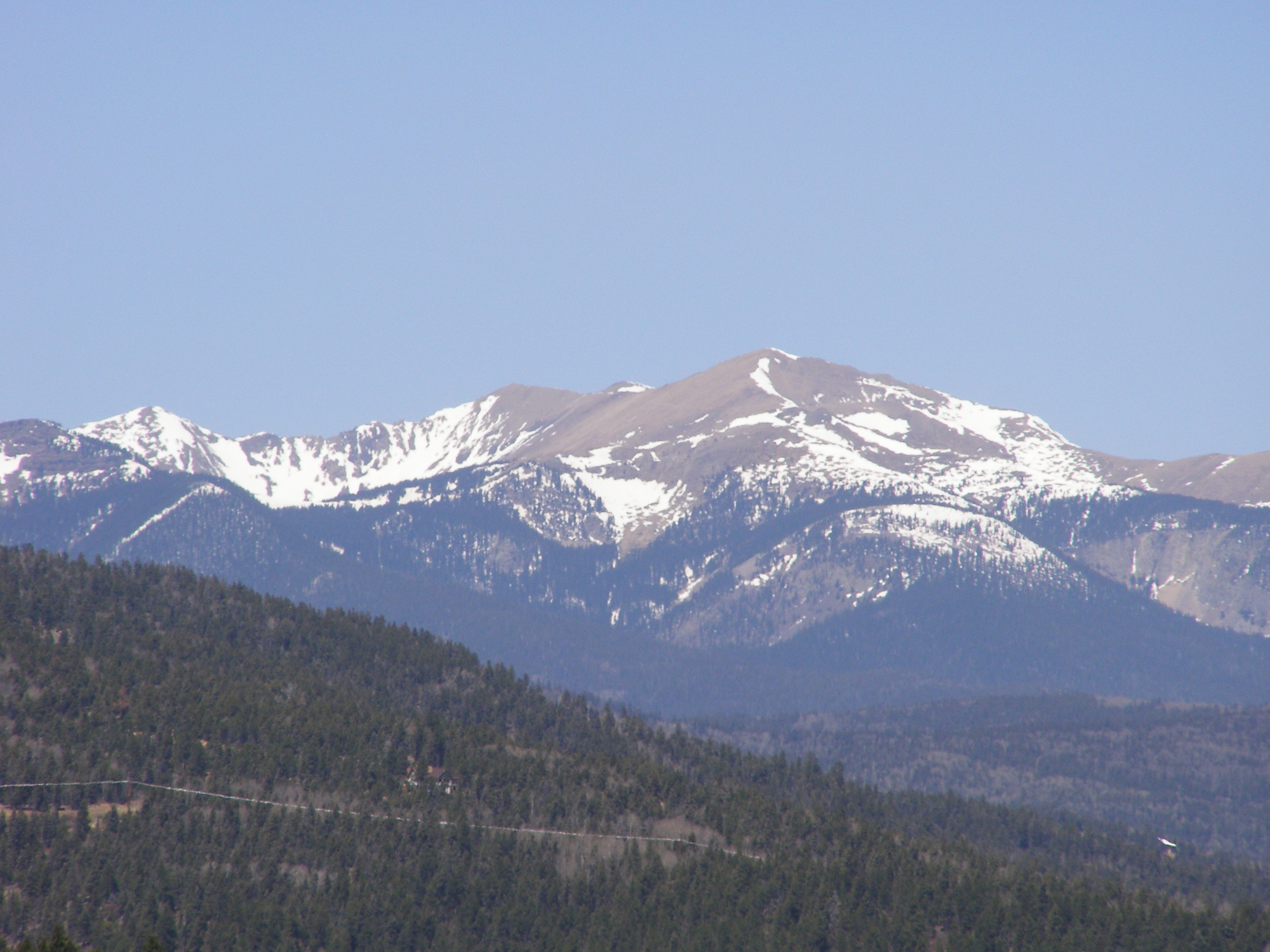
Wheeler Peak, the highest point in the State of New Mexico

- Waterfalls of New Mexico
  - commons:Category:Waterfalls of New Mexico
- Wheeler Peak
- White Sands National Park
  Wikimedia
  - Wikimedia Commons:Category:New Mexico
    - commons:Category:Maps of New Mexico
  - Wikinews:Category:New Mexico
    - Wikinews:Portal:New Mexico
  - Wikipedia Category:New Mexico
    - Wikipedia:WikiProject New Mexico
      - Category:WikiProject New Mexico articles
      - Category:WikiProject New Mexico participants
- Wind power in New Mexico
- Writers of New Mexico

== Y ==
- Yucca elata
- Yucca
- Yunque Yunque

== Z ==
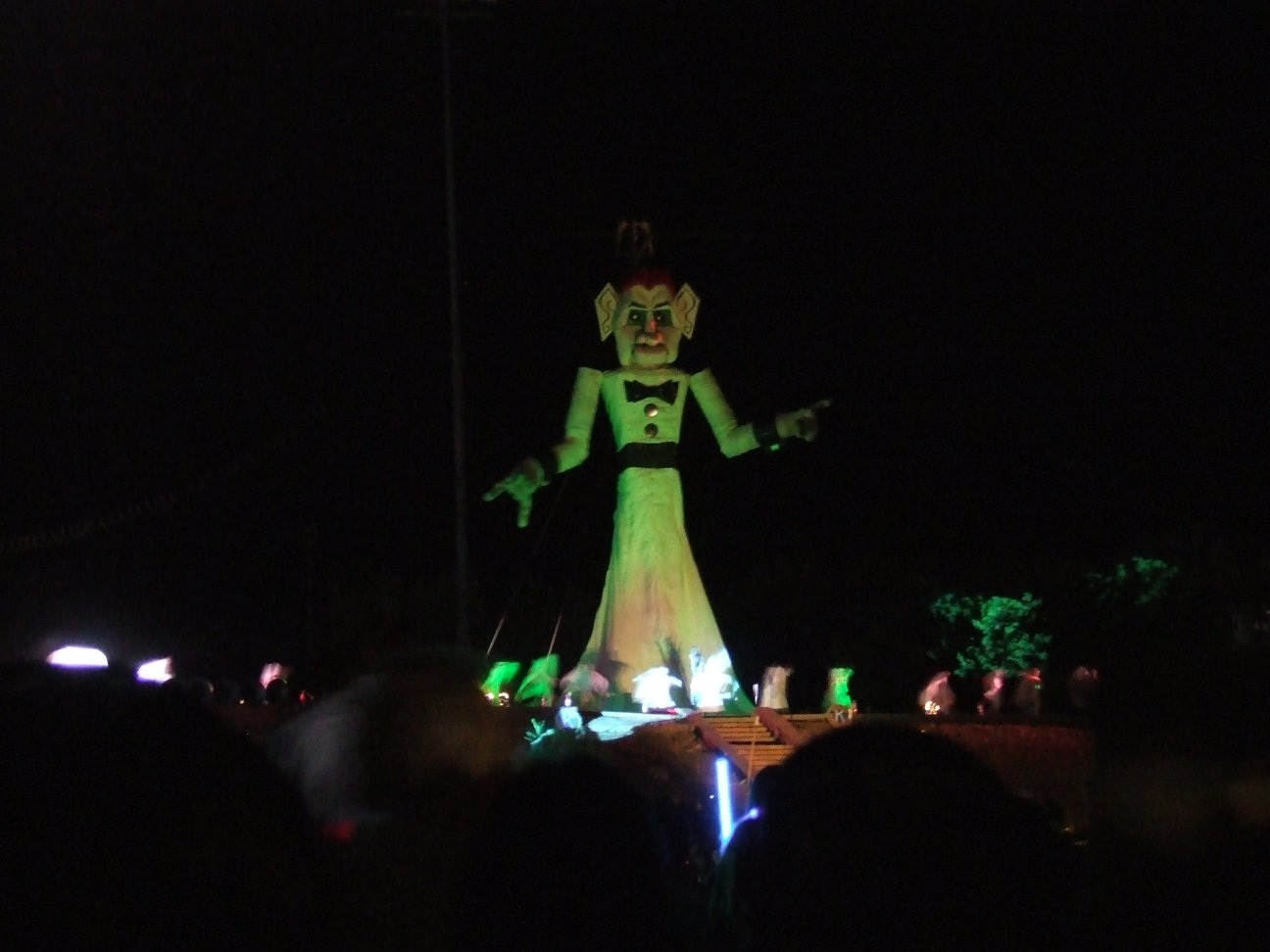
Zozobra

- Zia Nation (Native American)
- Zia Pueblo website
- Zoos in New Mexico
  - commons:Category:Zoos in New Mexico
- Zozobra
- Zuñi Nation (Native American)
- Zuñi Pueblo website

== See also ==
- Topic overview:
  - New Mexico
  - Outline of New Mexico
