= Outline of New Mexico =

U.S. state

The flag of New Mexico

The seal of New Mexico

The location of the state of New Mexico in the United States of America

The following outline is provided as an overview of and topical guide to the U.S. state of New Mexico:

New Mexico – U.S. state located in the southwest region of the United States. It is the state with the highest percentage of Hispanics, including descendants of Spanish colonists and recent immigrants from Latin America. Congress admitted New Mexico to the Union as the 47th State on January 6, 1912.

== General reference ==
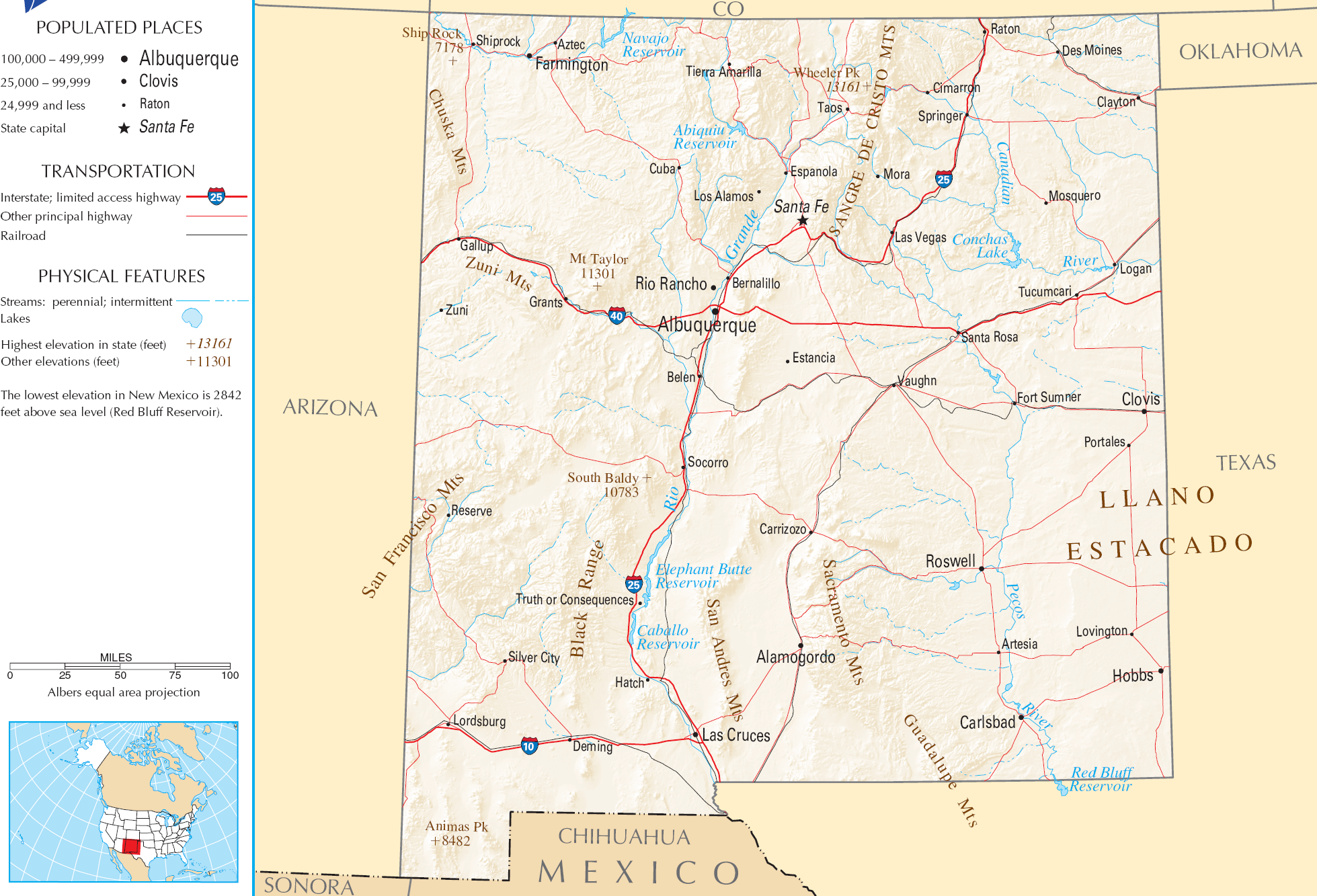
An enlargeable map of the State of New Mexico

- Names
  - Common name: New Mexico
    - Pronunciation:
  - Official name: State of New Mexico
  - Abbreviations and name codes
    - Postal symbol: NM
    - ISO 3166-2 code: US-NM
    - Internet second-level domain: .nm.us
  - Nicknames
    - Land of Enchantment (currently used on license plates)
    - Land of Sunshine (predates "Land of Enchantment"; this earlier nickname highlighted the large percentage of sunshine received statewide)
    - The Outer Space State
- Adjectivals
  - New Mexico
  - New Mexican
- Demonym: New Mexican

== Geography of New Mexico ==
Geography of New Mexico

- New Mexico is: a U.S. state, a federal state of the United States of America
- Location
  - Northern Hemisphere
  - Western Hemisphere
    - Americas
      - North America
        - Anglo America
        - Northern America
          - United States of America
            - Contiguous United States
              - Western United States
                - Mountain West United States
                - Southwestern United States
- Population of New Mexico: 2,059,179 (2010 U.S. Census)
- Area of New Mexico: 121,590 sq mi (314,900 km^{2})
- Atlas of New Mexico

=== Places in New Mexico ===
- Historic places in New Mexico
  - Ghost towns in New Mexico
  - National Historic Landmarks in New Mexico
  - National Register of Historic Places listings in New Mexico
    - Bridges on the National Register of Historic Places in New Mexico
- National Natural Landmarks in New Mexico
- National parks in New Mexico
- State parks in New Mexico

=== Environment of New Mexico ===
- Climate of New Mexico
  - Climate change in New Mexico
- Superfund sites in New Mexico
- Wildlife of New Mexico
  - Fauna of New Mexico
    - Birds of New Mexico

==== Natural geographic features of New Mexico ====
- Mountain ranges of New Mexico
- Rivers of New Mexico
- Valleys of New Mexico

=== Regions of New Mexico ===
- Central New Mexico
- Eastern New Mexico
- Northern New Mexico
- Southern New Mexico
  - Southwestern New Mexico

==== Administrative divisions of New Mexico ====
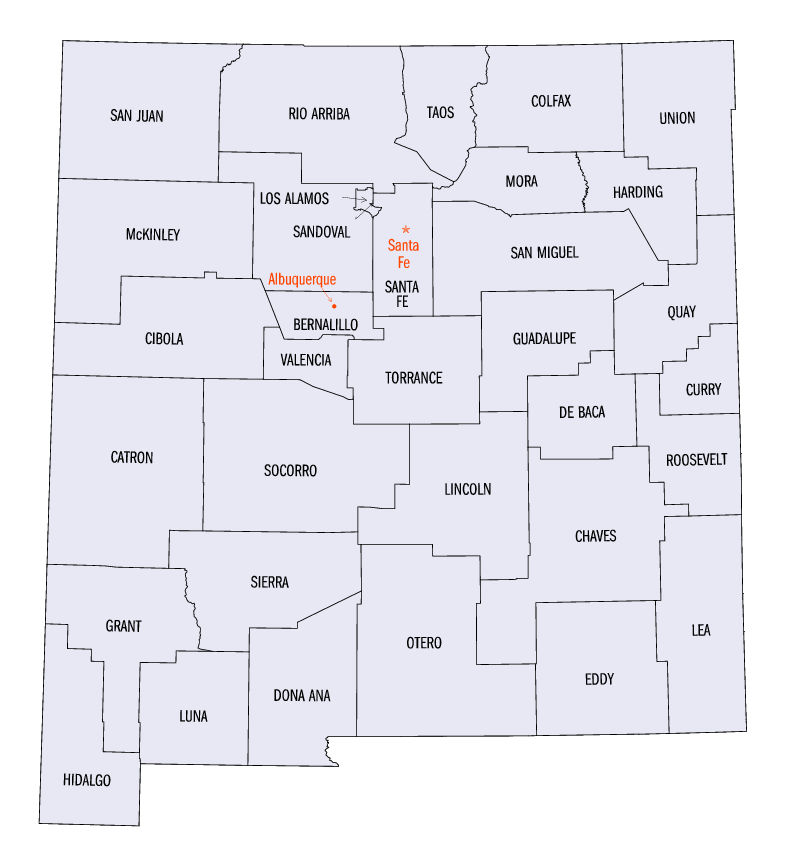
An enlargeable map of the 33 counties of the state of New Mexico

- The 33 counties of the state of New Mexico
  - Municipalities in New Mexico
    - Cities in New Mexico
      - State capital of New Mexico: Santa Fe
      - Largest city in New Mexico: Albuquerque (34th-largest city in the U.S. As of June 2007)
      - City nicknames in New Mexico

=== Demography of New Mexico ===
- Demographics of New Mexico
- List of New Mexico counties by socioeconomic factors

== Government and politics of New Mexico ==
Politics of New Mexico

- Form of government: U.S. state government
- New Mexico's congressional delegations
- New Mexico State Capitol
- Elections in New Mexico
  - Electoral reform in New Mexico
- Political party strength in New Mexico

=== Branches of the government of New Mexico ===
Government of New Mexico

==== Executive branch of the government of New Mexico ====
- Governor of New Mexico
  - Lieutenant Governor of New Mexico
  - Secretary of State of New Mexico
- State departments
  - New Mexico Department of Transportation

==== Legislative branch of the government of New Mexico ====
- New Mexico Legislature (bicameral)
  - Upper house: New Mexico Senate
  - Lower house: New Mexico House of Representatives

==== Judicial branch of the government of New Mexico ====
Courts of New Mexico

- Supreme Court of New Mexico

=== Law and order in New Mexico ===
Law of New Mexico

- Cannabis in New Mexico
- Capital punishment in New Mexico
  - Individuals executed in New Mexico
- Constitution of New Mexico
- Crime in New Mexico
- Gun laws in New Mexico
- Law enforcement in New Mexico
  - Law enforcement agencies in New Mexico
    - New Mexico State Police
- Same-sex marriage in New Mexico

=== Military in New Mexico ===
- New Mexico Air National Guard
- New Mexico Army National Guard

== History of New Mexico ==
History of New Mexico

=== History of New Mexico, by period ===
- Prehistory of New Mexico
- Pueblo peoples
- Spanish exploration, 1541–1680
- Spanish colony of Santa Fé de Nuevo Méjico, 1598–1821
  - Juan de Oñate Salazar founds San Juan de los Caballeros near Ohkay Owingeh Pueblo, 1598
  - Juan Martinez de Montoya founds La Villa Real de la Santa Fé de San Francisco de Asís (Santa Fé) near pueblo, 1608
  - Governor Pedro de Peralta moves capital from San Juan to Santa Fé, 1610
    - Village of Taos founded near Pueblo de Taos, 1617
  - Po'pay leads Pueblo Revolt, 1680–1692
  - Governor Diego de Vargas Zapata y Luján Ponce de León y Contreras leads Reconquesta, 1692
  - Governor Francisco Cuervo y Valdés founds Ranchos de Alburquerque (Albuquerque), 1706
  - Rise of Comancheria
    - Spanish peace treaties with the Comanche
  - Domínguez–Escalante expedition, 1776
  - United States presses territorial claims from Louisiana Purchase of 1803
    - Spanish cavalry arrests U.S. Army Pike Expedition, 1807
  - Adams–Onís Treaty of 1819
- Mexican War of Independence, September 16, 1810 – August 24, 1821
  - Treaty of Córdoba, August 24, 1821
- Mexican territory of Santa Fé de Nuevo México, 1821–1846
  - William Becknell opens Santa Fe Trail, 1821
  - Constitution of Mexico of 1824
  - Antonio Armijo opens Spanish Trail, 1829
  - Republic of Texas presses territorial claims, 1836–1845
    - Mexican Army arrests Texan Santa Fe Expedition, 1841
  - Revolt of 1837
- Mexican–American War, April 25, 1846 – February 2, 1848
  - U.S. Military Province of New Mexico, 1846
    - Military Governor – General Stephen Watts Kearny, 1846
  - Siege of Pueblo de Taos, 1847
  - Treaty of Guadalupe Hidalgo, February 2, 1848
- U.S. Provisional Government of New Mexico 1846–1850
  - State of Deseret (extralegal), 1849–1850
  - Proposed state of New Mexico, 1850
  - Compromise of 1850
- Territory of New Mexico, 1850–1912
  - Gadsden Purchase of 1853
  - Long Walk to Bosque Redondo, 1860–1861
  - American Civil War, April 12, 1861 – May 13, 1865
    - New Mexico in the American Civil War, 1861–1865
      - Border territory, 1861–1865
      - New Mexico Campaign, 1862
        - Battle of Glorieta Pass, March 26–28, 1862
      - Confederate Territory of Arizona, 1861–1865
  - Comanche Campaign, 1868–1874
  - Spanish–American War, April 25 – August 12, 1898
- State of New Mexico becomes 47th State admitted to the United States of America on January 6, 1912
  - World War I, June 28, 1914 – November 11, 1918
    - United States enters Great War on April 6, 1917
  - Carlsbad Caverns National Park established on May 14, 1930
  - World War II, September 1, 1939 – September 2, 1945
    - United States enters Second World War on December 8, 1941
    - Manhattan Engineering District, 1941–1946
      - Site Y (Los Alamos National Laboratory), since 1943
      - Z Division (Sandia National Laboratories), since 1945
      - Trinity Site (White Sands Missile Range), since 1945
        - Trinity Test, 1945-07-16

=== History of New Mexico, by region ===
- By city
  - History of Roswell, New Mexico
  - History of Santa Fe, New Mexico

=== History of New Mexico, by subject ===
- Territorial evolution of New Mexico
- Uranium mining in New Mexico

== Culture of New Mexico ==
Culture of New Mexico

- Cuisine of New Mexico
- Museums in New Mexico
- Religion in New Mexico
- Scouting in New Mexico
- State symbols of New Mexico
  - Flag of the State of New Mexico
  - Great Seal of the State of New Mexico

=== The Arts in New Mexico ===
- Music of New Mexico

=== Sports in New Mexico ===
Sports in New Mexico

== Economy and infrastructure of New Mexico ==
Economy of New Mexico

- Communications in New Mexico
  - Newspapers in New Mexico
  - Radio stations in New Mexico
  - Television stations in New Mexico
- Energy in New Mexico
  - Power stations in New Mexico
  - Solar power in New Mexico
  - Wind power in New Mexico
  - Uranium mining in New Mexico
- Health care in New Mexico
  - Hospitals in New Mexico
- Transportation in New Mexico
  - Airports in New Mexico

== Education in New Mexico ==
Education in New Mexico

- Schools in New Mexico
  - School districts in New Mexico
    - High schools in New Mexico
  - Colleges and universities in New Mexico
    - University of New Mexico
    - New Mexico State University

== See also ==
- Topic overview:
  - New Mexico
  - Index of New Mexico-related articles
