= El Rito =

El Rito may refer to:

- El Rito, Cibola County, New Mexico
- El Rito, Rio Arriba County, New Mexico
- El Rito, Taos County, New Mexico
- El Rito Presbyterian Church, a church in Chacón

== See also ==
- Rito (disambiguation)
