= Nuevo México =

Nuevo México may refer to:

- Santa Fe de Nuevo México, a Kingdom of the Spanish Empire and New Spain, later a territory of Mexico
- New Mexico Territory, an organized incorporated territory of the United States 1850–1912
- New Mexico, a U.S. state
- Nuevo México, Chiapas, a locality in Villaflores, Chiapas, Mexico
- Nuevo México, Jalisco, Mexico
- Nuevo México, Chiriquí, Panama

== See also ==
- "A Nuevo México", the New Mexico state poem
