= Rito =

Rito may refer to:

== Fiction ==
- Asu Rito, a character from Yandere Simulator
- Rito (The Legend of Zelda), an avian race in The Legend of Zelda video game series
- Rito Revolto, a character from Power Rangers
- Rito Yuuki, character from the anime and manga To-Love-Ru

== Other ==
- Rito (language) also called Luto and Lutos, language of people in the southwestern part of Chad and across the border in the northern part of the Central African Republic
- Rito Seco, a creek in Colorado, U.S.

== See also ==
- El Rito (disambiguation)
