= Cimarron Solar Facility =

Photovoltaic power station in New Mexico

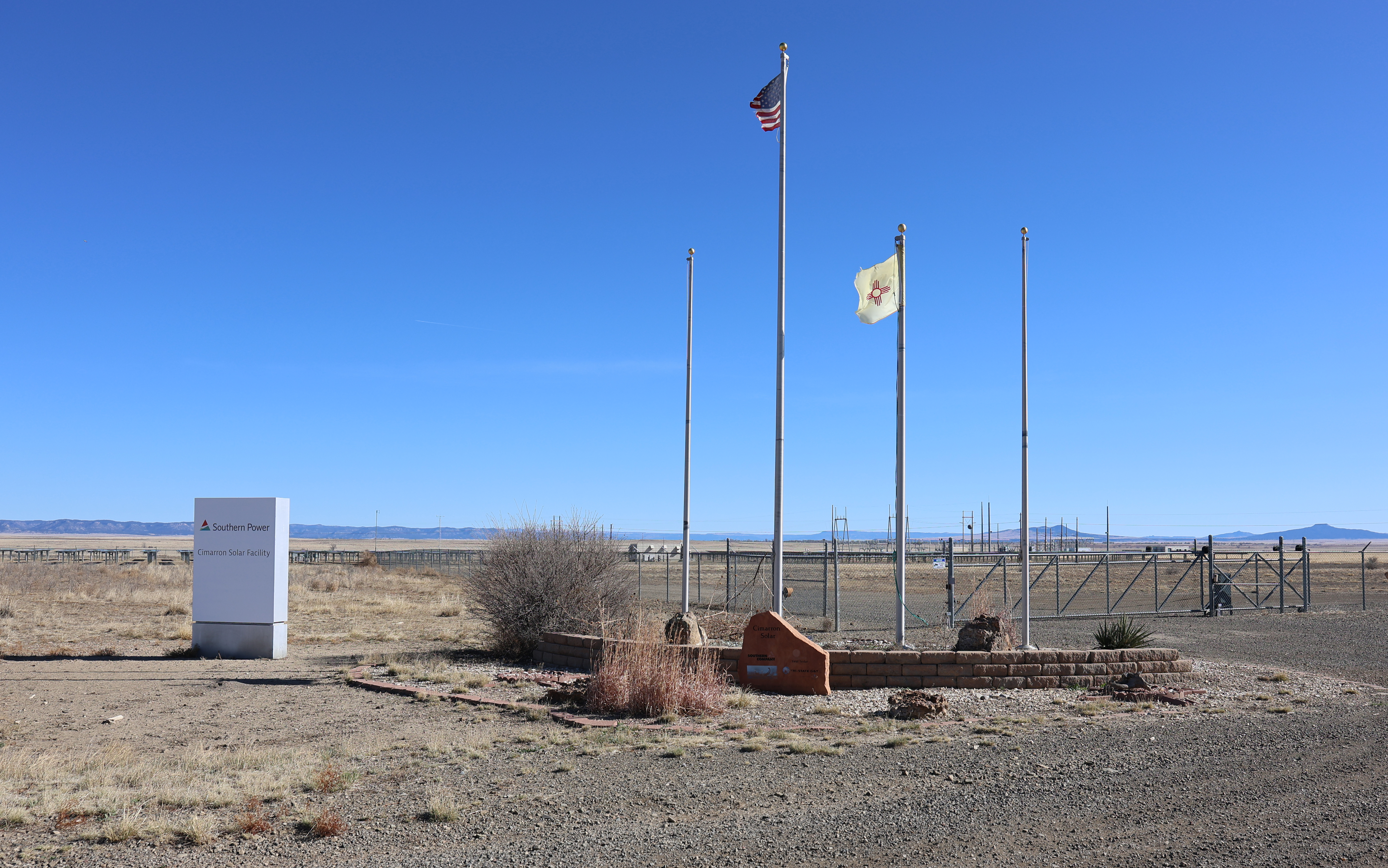
- The facility's entrance area (2026)
- Country: United States
- Location: Colfax County, New Mexico
- Coordinates: 36°28′N 104°38′W
- Status: Operational
- Commission date: November 2010
- Owner: Southern Company
- Operator: First Solar

Solar farm
- Type: Flat-panel PV fixed tilt
- Site area: 250 acres (101 ha)

Power generation
- Units operational: 490,000
- Nameplate capacity: 37 MW_{p}, 30 MW_{AC}
- Capacity factor: 24.6% (average 2011-2017)
- Annual net output: 64.6 GW·h, 260 MW·h/acre

The Cimarron Solar Facility is a 30 megawatt (MW_{AC}) photovoltaic power station in Colfax County, New Mexico, United States. It was the largest solar facility in the state when completed in December 2010, and uses Thin-film solar panels manufactured by the U.S. firm First Solar. The electricity is being sold to Tri-State Generation and Transmission under a 25-year power purchase agreement.

== Electricity production ==
Generation (MW·h) of Cimarron Solar Facility
Year	Jan	Feb	Mar	Apr	May	Jun	Jul	Aug	Sep	Oct	Nov	Dec	Total
2010										1,041	3,975	3,914	8,930
2011	4,783	5,022	6,326	6,432	7,167	5,813	6,044	5,874	5,510	5,848	4,942	4,217	67,978
2012	4,887	4,957	6,241	5,835	6,700	6,164	6,491	5,413	5,433	5,870	4,925	7,003	69,919
2013	4,406	4,746	6,009	5,758	6,495	6,209	6,091	5,965	5,629	6,227	4,619	4,438	66,592
2014	4,785	4,611	5,790	5,630	5,674	6,294	5,265	6,034	5,503	5,468	4,037	3,352	62,443
2015	3,824	4,176	5,469	5,817	5,610	5,797	5,565	5,838	5,549	4,833	4,338	3,969	60,785
2016	4,465	5,007	5,700	5,520	6,060	5,928	6,080	5,410	5,583	5,699	4,363	3,879	63,694
2017	2,709	4,031	5,791	6,214	6,736	6,388	6,092	5,714	5,066	5,210	3,755	3,264	60,971
Average Annual Production (years 2011-2017) --->													64,626

== See also ==
- Solar power in New Mexico
