= Wind power in New Mexico =

Electricity from wind in one U.S. state

Wind power projects in New Mexico
Operating
Under construction

As of 2023, wind power was the top source of energy in New Mexico, with approximately 4,400 megawatts (MW) of electricity generating capacity responsible for 38% of electricity produced that year. Wind power in New Mexico has the potential to generate more than all of the electricity consumed in the state.

== Wind resources ==
The 250 MW capacity Roosevelt wind farm started operation in December 2015. The plant sells electricity to Southwestern Public Service.

Construction of the 298 MW El Cabo Wind Farm west of Encino was completed at the end of 2017. The Red Cloud 331 MW wind farm in south east New Mexico has over 40% capacity factor, and sends power to LADWP at $0.043/kWh for 20 years.

The SunZia Wind project will begin construction in 2023 and will be the largest wind farm in North America upon completion with 3,500 MW of capacity. A 3,000 MW HVDC transmission line will supply electricity to Arizona.

== Installed capacity ==
The following table compares the growth in wind power installed nameplate capacity in MW for New Mexico and the entire United States since 1999.

Installed capacity by state as of 2018 (animated map of installed capacity growth)

Year	New Mexico	US
1999	0.7	2,472
2000	0.7	2,539
2001	0.7	4,232
2002	0.7	4,687
2003	206	6,350
2004	266	6,723
2005	406	9,147
2006	496	11,575
2007	496	16,907
2008	497.5	25,410
2009	597.5	34,863
2010	699.9	40,267
2011	750	46,916
2012	778	60,005
2013	778	61,107
2014	812	65,880
2015	1,080	74,471
2016	1,112	82,171
2017	1,682	89,078
2018	1,732	96,487
2019	1,953	105,583
2020	2,723	122,478
2021	4,001	135,843

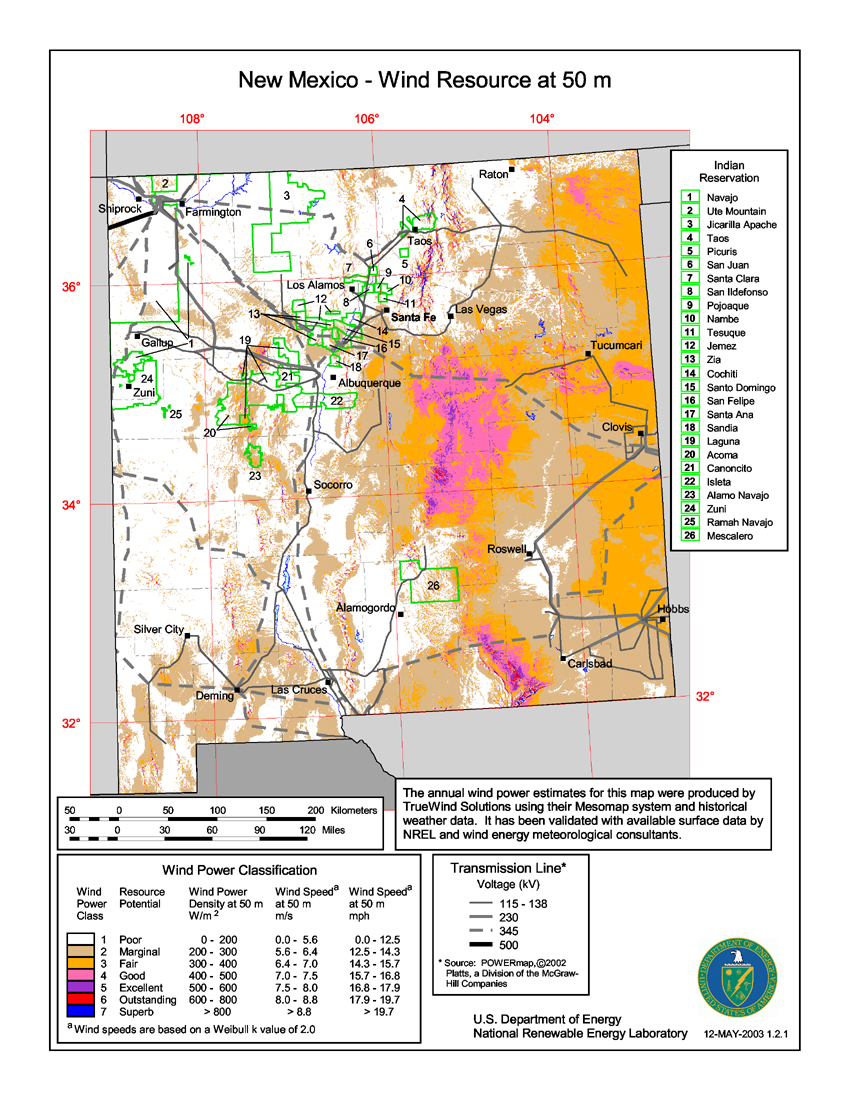
Average annual wind power density map for New Mexico at 50m above ground

A 2010 study by the National Renewable Energy Laboratory showed that New Mexico has the potential to install up to 492,083 MW of wind power nameplate capacity, generating 1,644,970 GWh annually. For comparison, New Mexico consumed 23,060 GWh of electricity in 2016, and 20,639 GWh in 2005.

== Wind generation ==
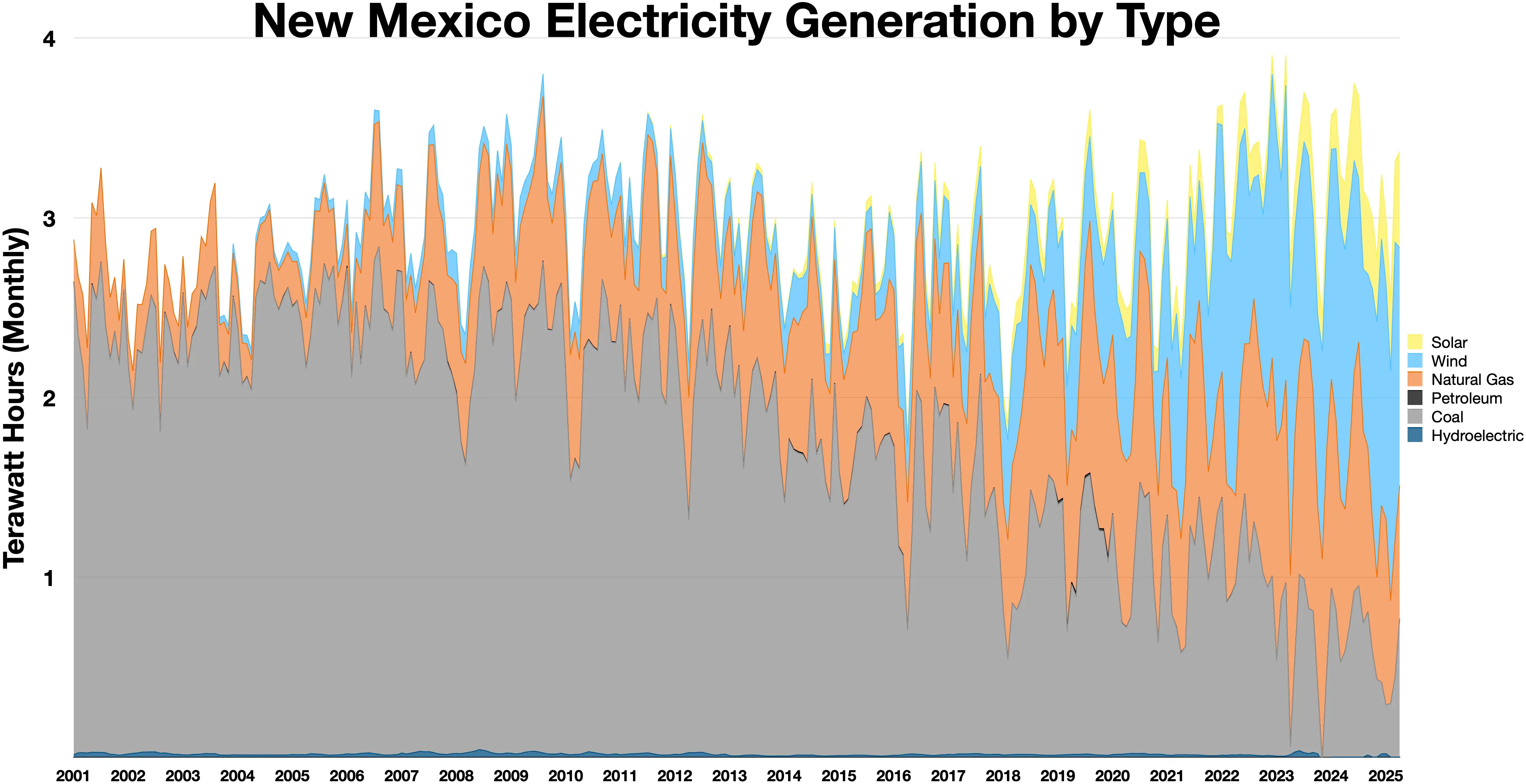
New Mexico electricity generation by type

New Mexico wind generation (GWh, million kWh)
Year	Total	Jan	Feb	Mar	Apr	May	Jun	Jul	Aug	Sep	Oct	Nov	Dec
2003	183									43	38	51	51
2004	513	49	46	49	56	54	39	28	31	40	23	46	52
2005	794	62	45	81	80	70	72	66	47	60	53	70	88
2006	1,256	133	108	145	140	93	102	80	61	84	107	114	89
2007	1,395	95	104	121	136	113	95	70	109	120	151	120	161
2008	1,641	176	151	162	163	151	143	97	76	95	128	135	164
2009	1,547	143	149	163	145	109	90	94	123	95	163	133	140
2010	1,833	156	94	168	199	194	139	102	120	136	144	182	199
2011	2,105	183	186	210	248	235	203	118	92	113	159	206	152
2012	2,226	230	213	220	193	194	188	124	119	131	198	182	234
2013	2,192	190	214	232	224	210	185	124	111	139	197	166	200
2014	2,275	248	198	254	258	190	211	125	103	134	149	224	181
2015	2,090	124	145	143	224	184	127	116	125	143	160	224	375
2016	3,605	308	327	378	310	338	195	289	193	262	324	305	376
2017	4,595	342	342	363	401	399	343	309	272	351	498	499	476
2018	6,092	532	553	608	668	512	521	334	373	406	471	561	553
2019	6,891	542	600	551	578	591	516	492	469	573	629	661	689
2020	7,224	696	630	738	679	657	759	437	480	491	265	693	699
2021	10,646	792	756	1,018	927	976	780	520	707	842	887	933	1,508
2022	14,499	1,365	1,275	1,284	1,597	1,404	1,210	853	692	960	966	1,345	1,548
2023	11,482	1,681	1,355	1,623	1,484	1,145	1,234	1,052	982	1,071			

Teal background indicates the largest wind generation month for the year.
Green background indicates the largest wind generation month to date.

== See also ==
- Index of New Mexico-related articles
- List of U.S. states by carbon dioxide emissions
- List of wind farms in the United States
- Outline of New Mexico
- Solar power in New Mexico
