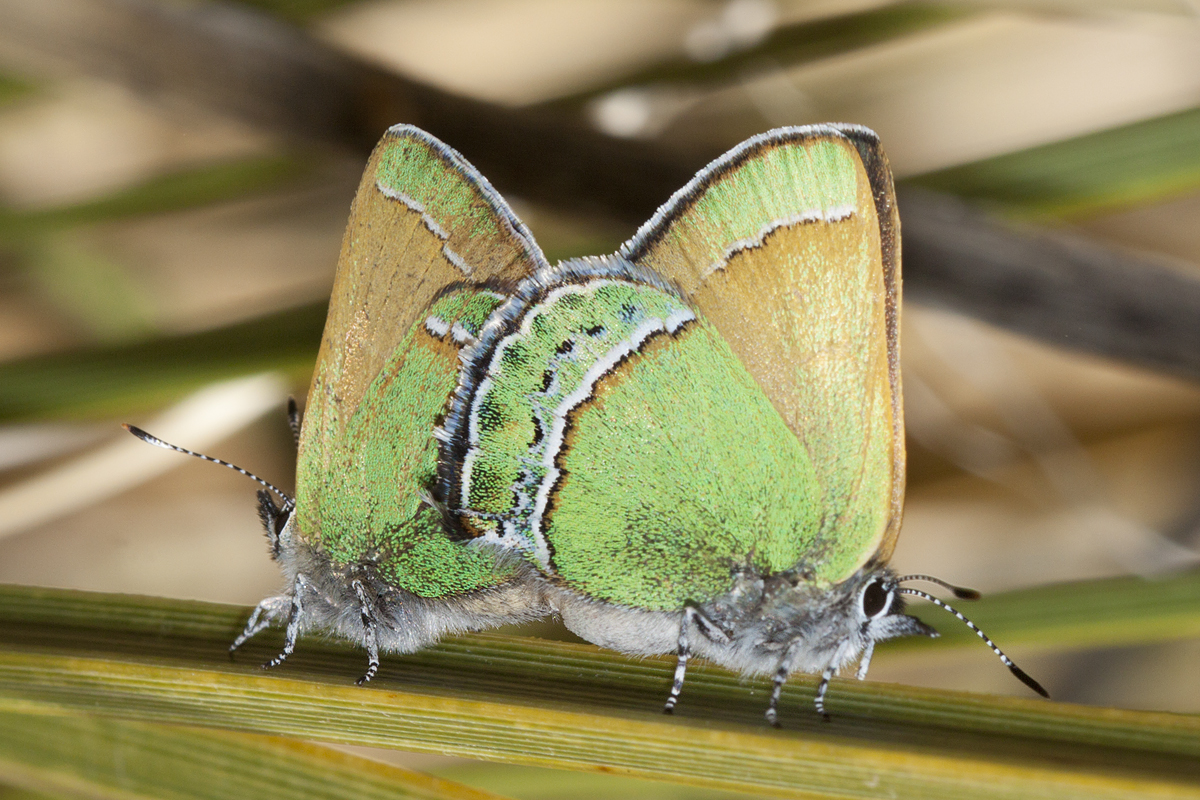
- Mating in New Mexico

Scientific classification
- Kingdom: Animalia
- Phylum: Arthropoda
- Clade: Pancrustacea
- Class: Insecta
- Order: Lepidoptera
- Family: Lycaenidae
- Genus: Callophrys
- Species: C. mcfarlandi

Binomial name
- Callophrys mcfarlandi Ehrlich & Clench, 1960

Synonyms
- Sandia mcfarlandi

= Sandia hairstreak =

Species of butterfly

The Sandia hairstreak (Callophrys mcfarlandi) is a species of butterfly native to North America. A relatively rare butterfly with a limited range, it was discovered in La Cueva Canyon, Albuquerque, in spring of 1958, by Noel McFarland, then a student at the University of Kansas, and described the following year. The Sandia hairstreak was made one of the state insects of New Mexico in a 2002 bill approved the following year.

== Description ==
C. mcfarlandi is a relatively small butterfly with tailless wings that span 2.9–3.2 cm (1 1/8 to 1 1/4 inches). The wings of females are generally reddish-brown on the dorsal side with a narrow border of black around the edge. Males are typically brown. The underside of the wings of both sexes is usually greenish-yellow on the undersides with a postmedian line bordered with black near the base. This species exhibits a certain amount of polymorphism, making the phenotype of some individuals significantly different from that described here but according to one simple description "it is small and gold and green in color and it lives in and among beargrass plants, where its pink, lavender and white caterpillars eat beargrass flowers, making the butterfly and its caterpillar easy to identify."

A butterfly hunter writing for Orion magazine describes:

... hairstreaks – "hair" for the tiny tails many kinds trail from their hindwings, "streak" for their stripes, or perhaps derived from their zippy flight. Many hairstreaks make their appearance early, then are seen no more ... Goldy-green with a white stripe below, it blends perfectly with its larval host ... I found the plant, and the butterfly, in its type locality (= place of original collection and description) – the Sandia Mountains, outside Albuquerque. What very different worlds: the beargrass mounts, the huge nearby casino, the city beyond. Hairstreaks, with their specific botanical needs and moist-spring ways, may be some of the first butterflies to feel the warming and drying, and to abandon historical ranges. But the Sandia is still there for now.

=== Life cycle ===
In March, the female lays its eggs on the stalks of Texas sacahuista (Nolina texana). Its caterpillars are naturally monophagous (feeding only) on this plant and eat both its flowers and its fruit during April. In May, the caterpillars crawl into the leaf litter under the plant and form a chrysalis. The adult butterfly emerges the following spring. Adults feed on the nectar of the same host plants used by their larvae. and look for a mate.

An entomologist at the University of California, Riverside, discovered they could be raised in the laboratory on Lotus scoparius with little or no retardation in development (whereas a few other picky lycaenids did not fare as well) suggesting that its ancestral range was once much larger.

== Distribution and habitat ==
The Sandia hairstreak has a range limited to yucca-agave desert in the Southwestern United States (specifically southeast Colorado south through New Mexico and western Texas) and northeast Mexico.

== State butterfly ==
The Sandia hairstreak was made the official state butterfly of New Mexico by the New Mexico Legislature in 2004. In their declaration they opined that this species (despite its range beyond the state) was "thought of as uniquely New Mexican". Among the many other reasons they cited for naming the Sandia hairstreak as an official symbol include:

... an official butterfly symbol would add color, beauty and diversity to the state's array of existing symbols ... at least seventeen other states have official butterfly symbols ... butterflies enhance the beauty of the environment, and naming a butterfly symbol would benefit tourism and the economy of New Mexico by bringing attention to a New Mexico butterfly, by adding credibility to New Mexico among entomologists, which may encourage scientific research in the state, and by providing educational opportunities for study and appreciation of the butterfly and its habitat ... naming a New Mexico butterfly would enhance awareness of the importance of butterflies, in ecosystems as important pollinators for wildflowers and agricultural crops and promote the conservation of our natural wildlife heritage ... children love butterflies, and naming a New Mexico butterfly would bring joy to New Mexico's children ... the Sandia hairstreak symbolizes the ability of New Mexican residents to thrive year-round in a semiarid climate where different years bring floods and droughts and where the terrain is beautiful but rugged ... the Sandia hairstreak can be easily found by children among the native beargrass in New Mexico's wide-open spaces as well as in towns and cities where the beargrass plant grows ... the Sandia hairstreak, a New Mexico native, does not migrate, but stays in the New Mexico landscape year-round and has not been designated as the state butterfly for any other state.

The legislative session also commended a group of dancers that had performed an original dance presentation entitled "The New Mexico Gossamer Wing" for their benefit.
