= Electoral reform in New Mexico =

Electoral reform in New Mexico refers to efforts to change election and voting laws in this arid U.S. state.

== Alternate voting systems ==
The Constitution of New Mexico specifies that the plurality candidate must be declared elected. There have been proposals in New Mexico to use instant runoff voting as a result of Green Party candidates contributing to Republican victories by acting as spoilers in House races. Specifically, the New Mexico State Senate came close to approving a constitutional amendment in 1998 to allow IRV with a favorable vote in the Rules Committee and a tie vote in the subsequent committee.

== Allocation of electoral votes ==
In 2007, SB 666 was introduced to allocate New Mexico's 5 electoral votes to the winner of the nationwide popular vote, but it failed.
