= New Mexico statistical areas =

Coordinates: 34.4071°N 106.1126°W

The U.S. State of New Mexico currently has 19 statistical areas that have been delineated by the Office of Management and Budget (OMB). On July 21, 2023, the OMB delineated two combined statistical areas, four metropolitan statistical areas, and 13 micropolitan statistical areas in New Mexico. As of 2025, the largest of these is the Albuquerque-Santa Fe-Los Alamos, NM CSA, comprising the area around New Mexico's largest city of Albuquerque as well as its capital, Santa Fe.

== Statistical areas ==
The Office of Management and Budget (OMB) has designated more than 1,000 statistical areas for the United States and Puerto Rico. These statistical areas are important geographic delineations of population clusters used by the OMB, the United States Census Bureau, planning organizations, and federal, state, and local government entities.

The OMB defines a core-based statistical area (commonly referred to as a CBSA) as the county or counties (or county-equivalents) surrounding at least one densely-settled core of at least 10,000 population, "plus adjacent counties having a high degree of social and economic integration with the core as measured through commuting ties with the counties containing the core". The OMB further divides core-based statistical areas based on population into metropolitan statistical areas (MSAs) for those with at least 50,000 and micropolitan statistical areas (μSAs) for those with 10,000 to 49,999 people.

The OMB defines a combined statistical area (CSA) as two or more adjacent core-based statistical areas where the employment interchange rate (% commuting from A to B plus % commuting from B to A) is at least 15%. The primary statistical areas (PSAs) include all combined statistical areas and any core-based statistical area that is not a constituent of a combined statistical area.

The 19 United States statistical areas and 33 counties of the State of New Mexico (Note: An out-of-state area and its population are displayed in green. An area that extends into more than one state is displayed in purple. A purple population number over a black population number show the total population versus the in-state population.)
| Combined statistical area | 2025 population (est.) | Core-based statistical area | 2025 population (est.) | County | 2025 population (est.) |
|---|---|---|---|---|---|
| Albuquerque–Santa Fe–Los Alamos, NM CSA | 1,171,736 | Albuquerque, NM MSA | 925,279 | Bernalillo County, New Mexico | 667,601 |
| Albuquerque–Santa Fe–Los Alamos, NM CSA | 1,171,736 | Albuquerque, NM MSA | 925,279 | Sandoval County, New Mexico | 159,565 |
| Albuquerque–Santa Fe–Los Alamos, NM CSA | 1,171,736 | Albuquerque, NM MSA | 925,279 | Valencia County, New Mexico | 82,013 |
| Albuquerque–Santa Fe–Los Alamos, NM CSA | 1,171,736 | Albuquerque, NM MSA | 925,279 | Torrance County, New Mexico | 16,100 |
| Albuquerque–Santa Fe–Los Alamos, NM CSA | 1,171,736 | Santa Fe, NM MSA | 156,907 | Santa Fe County, New Mexico | 156,907 |
| Albuquerque–Santa Fe–Los Alamos, NM CSA | 1,171,736 | Española, NM μSA | 39,832 | Rio Arriba County, New Mexico | 39,832 |
| Albuquerque–Santa Fe–Los Alamos, NM CSA | 1,171,736 | Las Vegas, NM μSA | 30,311 | San Miguel County, New Mexico | 26,260 |
| Albuquerque–Santa Fe–Los Alamos, NM CSA | 1,171,736 | Las Vegas, NM μSA | 30,311 | Mora County, New Mexico | 4,051 |
| Albuquerque–Santa Fe–Los Alamos, NM CSA | 1,171,736 | Los Alamos, NM μSA | 19,407 | Los Alamos County, New Mexico | 19,407 |
| El Paso–Las Cruces, TX-NM CSA | 1,110,382; 229,091 (NM) | El Paso, TX CSA | 881,291 | El Paso County, Texas | 877,858 |
| El Paso–Las Cruces, TX-NM CSA | 1,110,382; 229,091 (NM) | El Paso, TX CSA | 881,291 | Hudspeth County, Texas | 3,433 |
| El Paso–Las Cruces, TX-NM CSA | 1,110,382; 229,091 (NM) | Las Cruces, NM MSA | 229,091 | Doña Ana County, New Mexico | 229,091 |
| none | | Farmington, NM MSA | 120,340 | San Juan County, New Mexico | 120,340 |
| none | | Hobbs, NM μSA | 74,749 | Lea County, New Mexico | 74,749 |
| none | | Alamogordo, NM μSA | 70,368 | Otero County, New Mexico | 70,368 |
| none | | Gallup, NM μSA | 68,119 | McKinley County, New Mexico | 68,119 |
| none | | Clovis, NM μSA | 65,270 | Curry County, New Mexico | 46,655 |
| none | | Clovis, NM μSA | 65,270 | Roosevelt County, New Mexico | 18,615 |
| none | | Roswell, NM μSA | 63,364 | Chaves County, New Mexico | 63,364 |
| none | | Carlsbad–Artesia, NM μSA | 62,509 | Eddy County, New Mexico | 62,509 |
| none | | Taos, NM μSA | 34,564 | Taos County, New Mexico | 34,564 |
| none | | Silver City, NM μSA | 27,252 | Grant County, New Mexico | 27,252 |
| none | | Deming, NM μSA | 25,407 | Luna County, New Mexico | 25,407 |
| none | | Ruidoso, NM μSA | 19,844 | Lincoln County, New Mexico | 19,844 |
| none | | none | | Cibola County, New Mexico | 26,807 |
| none | | none | | Socorro County, New Mexico | 15,838 |
| none | | none | | Colfax County, New Mexico | 12,184 |
| none | | none | | Sierra County, New Mexico | 11,395 |
| none | | none | | Quay County, New Mexico | 8,454 |
| none | | none | | Guadalupe County, New Mexico | 4,343 |
| none | | none | | Hidalgo County, New Mexico | 3,929 |
| none | | none | | Union County, New Mexico | 3,844 |
| none | | none | | Catron County, New Mexico | 3,827 |
| none | | none | | De Baca County, New Mexico | 1,647 |
| none | | none | | Harding County, New Mexico | 617 |
| State of New Mexico | | | | | 2,125,498 |

The 17 core-based statistical areas of the State of New Mexico
| 2025 rank | Core-based statistical area | Population | | | | |
| 2025 rank | Core-based statistical area | 2025 estimate | Change | 2020 Census | Change | 2010 Census |
|---|---|---|---|---|---|---|
| 1 | Albuquerque, NM MSA | 925,279 | +0.95% | 916,528 | +3.32% | 887,077 |
| 2 | Las Cruces, NM MSA | 229,091 | +4.34% | 219,561 | +4.94% | 209,233 |
| 3 | Santa Fe, NM MSA | 156,907 | +1.35% | 154,823 | +7.39% | 144,170 |
| 4 | Farmington, NM MSA | 120,340 | −1.09% | 121,661 | −6.45% | 130,044 |
| 5 | Hobbs, NM μSA | 74,749 | +0.39% | 74,455 | +15.03% | 64,727 |
| 6 | Alamogordo, NM μSA | 70,368 | +3.73% | 67,839 | +6.34% | 63,797 |
| 7 | Gallup, NM μSA | 68,119 | −6.56% | 72,902 | +1.97% | 71,492 |
| 8 | Clovis, NM μSA | 65,270 | −3.48% | 67,621 | −0.88% | 68,222 |
| 9 | Roswell, NM μSA | 63,364 | −2.75% | 65,157 | −0.74% | 65,645 |
| 10 | Carlsbad–Artesia, NM μSA | 62,509 | +0.31% | 62,314 | +15.76% | 53,829 |
| 11 | Española, NM μSA | 39,832 | −1.32% | 40,363 | +0.29% | 40,246 |
| 12 | Taos, NM μSA | 34,564 | +0.22% | 34,489 | +4.71% | 32,937 |
| 13 | Las Vegas, NM μSA | 30,311 | −3.44% | 31,390 | −8.41% | 34,274 |
| 14 | Silver City, NM μSA | 27,252 | −3.31% | 28,185 | −4.50% | 29,514 |
| 15 | Deming, NM μSA | 25,407 | −0.08% | 25,427 | +1.32% | 25,095 |
| 16 | Ruidoso, NM μSA | 19,844 | −2.10% | 20,269 | −1.11% | 20,497 |
| 17 | Los Alamos, NM μSA | 19,407 | −0.06% | 19,419 | +8.18% | 17,950 |

The two combined statistical areas of the State of New Mexico (Note: For CSAs comprising populations from multiple states, they are listed twice to show both their intrastate population within that CSA as well as the CSA's total population. Only the intrastate population is ranked.)
| 2025 rank | Combined statistical area | Population | | | | |
| 2025 rank | Combined statistical area | 2025 estimate | Change | 2020 Census | Change | 2010 Census |
|---|---|---|---|---|---|---|
| 1 | Albuquerque–Santa Fe–Los Alamos, NM CSA | 1,171,736 | +0.79% | 1,162,523 | +3.45% | 1,123,717 |
| 2 | El Paso–Las Cruces, TX-NM CSA (NM) | 229,091 | +4.34% | 219,561 | +4.94% | 209,233 |
| | El Paso–Las Cruces, TX-NM CSA | 1,110,382 | +2.02% | 1,088,420 | +7.41% | 1,013,356 |

== See also ==
- Geography of New Mexico
  - Demographics of New Mexico
