= Land of Enchantment =

Land of Enchantment may refer to:

- New Mexico, a state in the United States with the official nickname Land of Enchantment
- Land of Enchantment (album), a New Mexico-inspired country music album by Michael Martin Murphey
- "Land of Enchantment" (The Curse), the first episode of the 2023 TV series The Curse
