= El Rito Presbyterian Church =

Coordinates: 36°8′41″N 105°22′6″W

El Rito Presbyterian Church is a church in Chacón, New Mexico

Early settlers came to Chacón (El Rito de Agua Negra) from Chamisal, where they were reportedly persecuted because of their Protestant beliefs. Their faith was enriched through the study of Spanish Bibles, provided by the Sandoval, Arqüello, and Ortega families. A school was started by the Arqüello's, which further encouraged Bible reading. In 1879, the group was organized as El Rito Presbyterian Church by the Rev. John Annin, the minister in Las Vegas, New Mexico. Elder Juan P Ortega, licensed as a lay evangelist, preached at Chacón through the 1880s. In the 1890s, the congregation was served by the Rev Joseph J. Gilchrist, who also produced a Protestant newspaper in Spanish, and trained local men to work as evangelists.

Native-born ministers educated at Presbyterian schools and colleges in New Mexico and elsewhere, predominated at Chacón from 1900 to 1958. During this period, an elementary school, staffed by women teachers from the Presbyterian Board of National Missions, taught children and sent them on to Allison-James in Santa Fe and Menaul School in Albuquerque, both in New Mexico. The school nourished the church, and also served the community as advocates, clinic and community center.

The church grew steadily until the 1930s, becoming one of the largest Spanish-language congregations in the Presbyterian Church. Numerous teachers, ministers, and Christian lay workers were sent out from El Rito. But the Great Depression, a decline in farming and World War II caused many families to relocate. At the seventy-fifth anniversary, the Rev Epifanio Romero compared the church to a rural irrigation system: "The water has been drained off to water the fields below. It has spent itself giving life to plants which would have suffered. And perhaps would have been lost otherwise...Our people left the community but are giving life and strength to churches in different places...Some have served [in mission work], some are still serving, still others are ready to start this very year of 1954." Over the years, members of the church have gone to serve as teachers, nurses, agronomists, administrators, ministers, and in other capacities across the United States and abroad.

Lay leadership from within the congregation has maintained the church over its life. Whenever a minister was not present, the members conducted worship services. The buildings have been maintained and improved, Bible school held, special events organized, and diaconal work continued by the members with help from many friends across the Presbyterian Church.

The community continues to change as families return after an absence of many years, challenged to continue the ministry, handing on the gifts that were given many years ago: knowledge of the Bible, and the certainty of God's unfolding purpose for their lives.
