= List of valleys of New Mexico =

This is a list of valleys of New Mexico. Valleys are ordered alphabetically, by county.

== Chaves County ==
E

- Eden Valley

== Colfax County ==
M

- Moreno Valley

== Doña Ana County ==
M

- Mesilla Valley

R

- Rincon Valley

T

- Tularosa Basin-(Tularosa Valley)

== Grant County ==
B

- Bear Valley

H

- Hachita Valley

== Hidalgo County ==
A

- Animas Valley

H

- Hachita Valley

P

- Playas Valley

== Lea County ==
S

- Simanola Valley

== Lincoln County ==
A

- Ancho Valley, Ancho, New Mexico

== Luna County ==
U

- Uvas Valley

== Otero County ==
T

- Tularosa Basin (Tularosa Valley)

== Sierra County ==
T

- Tularosa Basin (Tularosa Valley)

== See also ==
- List of mountain ranges of New Mexico
- List of rivers of New Mexico
