= Solar power in New Mexico =

Overview of solar power in the U.S. state of New Mexico

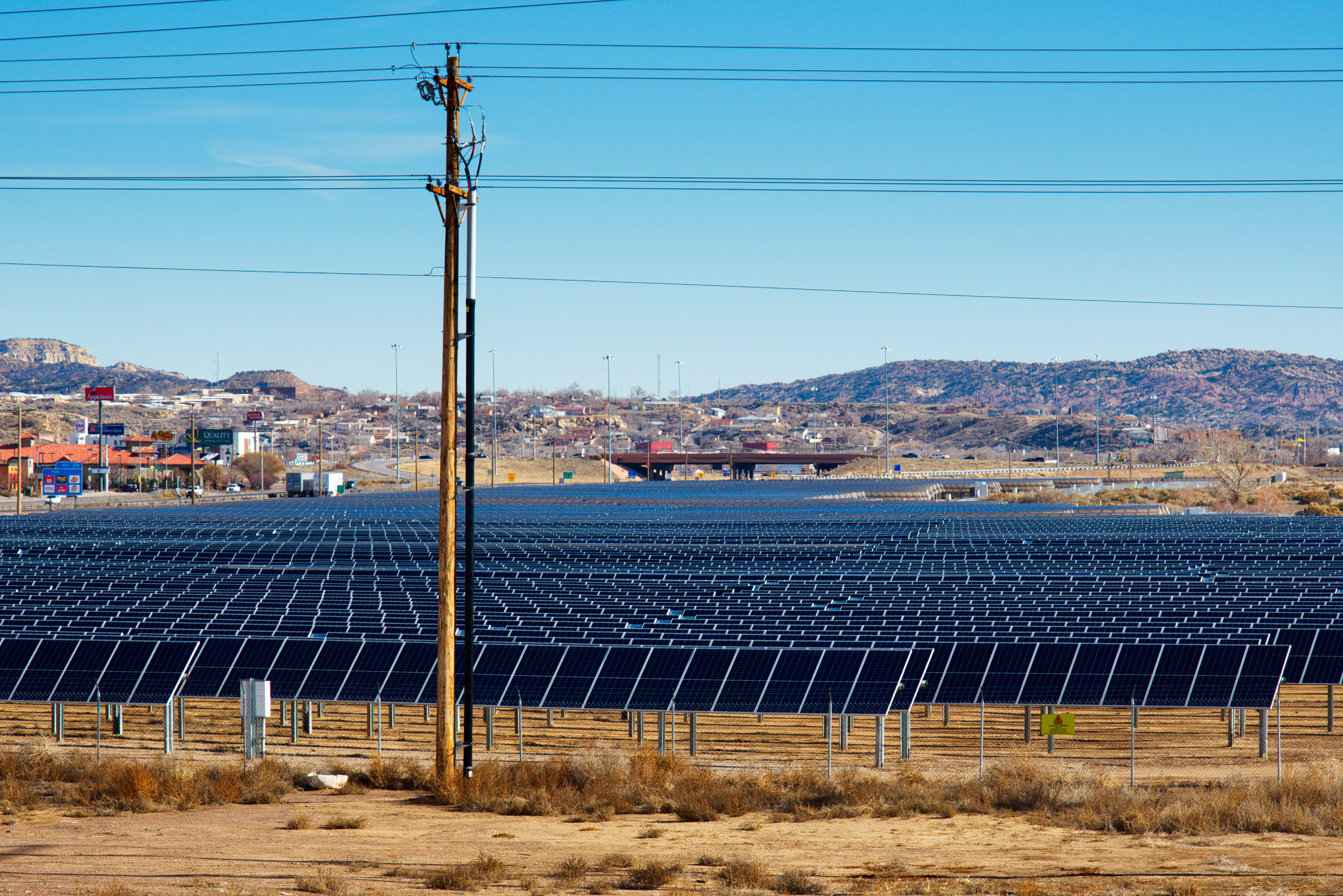
Solar farm, Gallup

Solar power in New Mexico in 2016 generated 2.8% of the state's total electricity consumption, despite a National Renewable Energy Laboratory (NREL) projection suggesting a potential contribution three orders of magnitude larger.

== Renewable Portfolio Standard ==
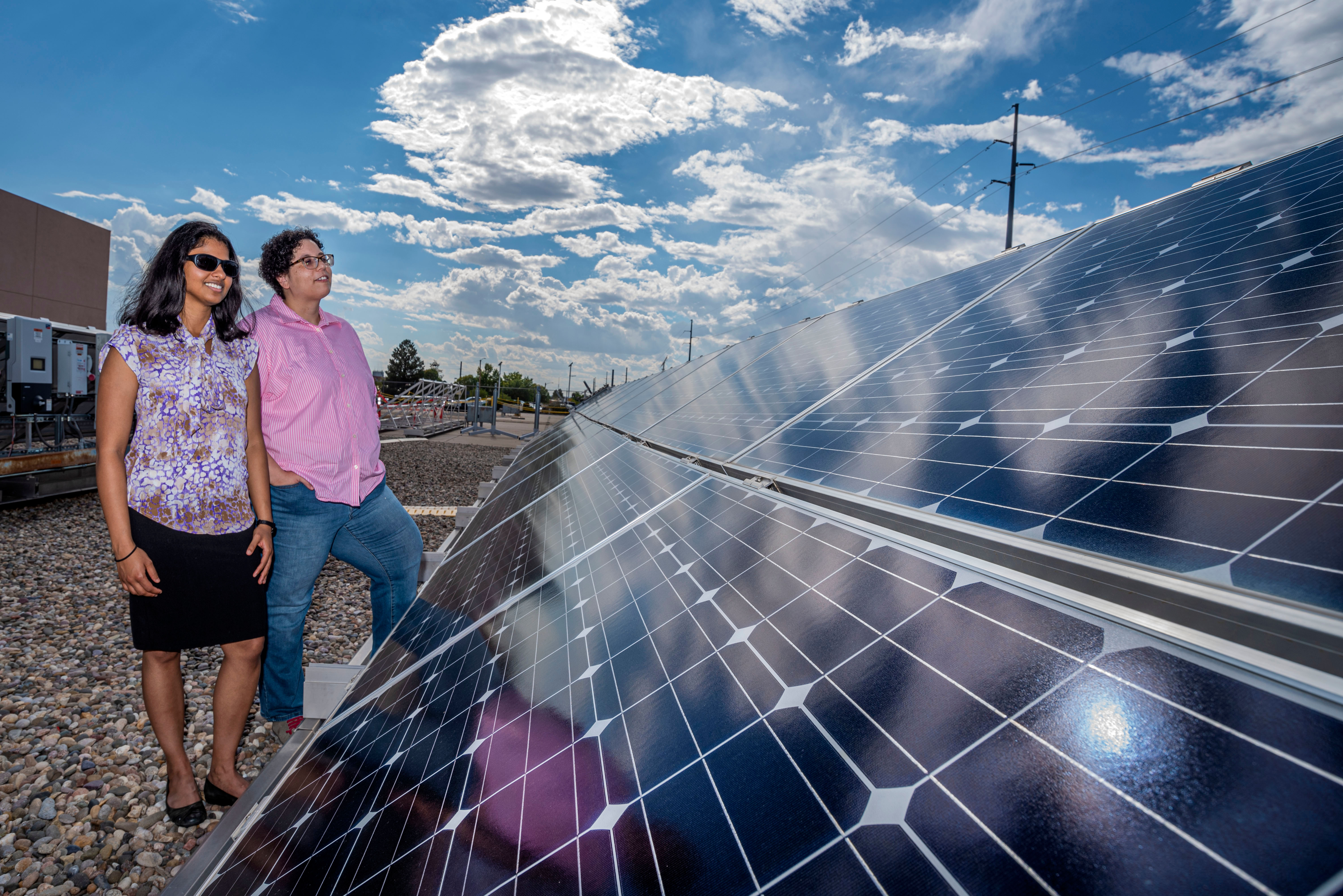
Solar panel research, Sandia National Laboratories, 2021

The New Mexico Renewable Portfolio Standard calls for 20% renewable energy by 2020, and 4% from solar power from investor owned utilities, and 10% renewable from rural electric cooperatives. Renewable Energy Certificates (RECs) may be sold through the Western Renewable Energy Generation Information System (WREGIS).

== Installed capacity ==
2018 electricity generation in New Mexico by source

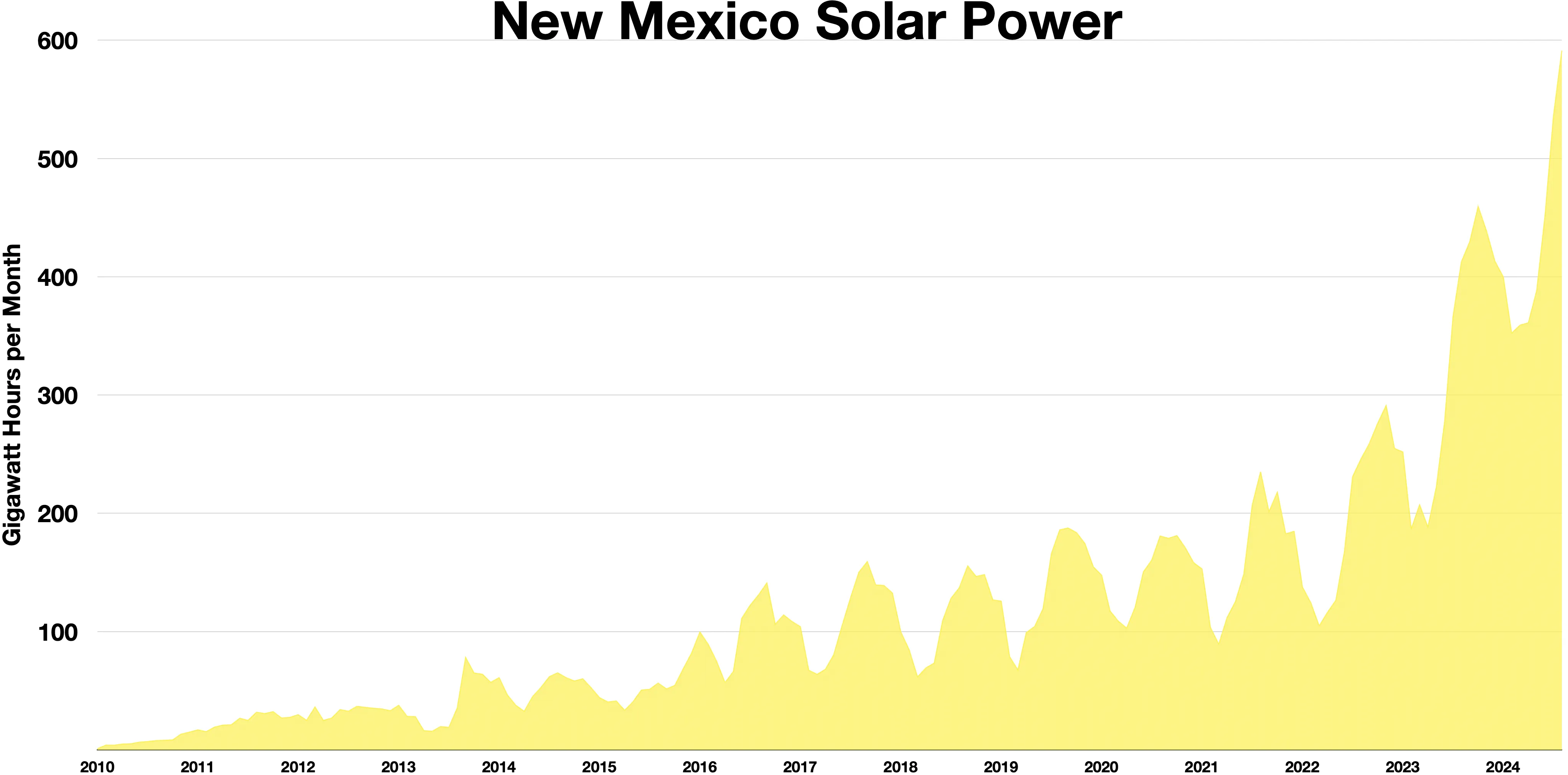
New Mexico solar power

New Mexico solar capacity (MWp)
Year	Photovoltaics		
Year	Capacity	Installed	% change
2007	0.5	0.2	67%
2008	1.0	0.6	100%
2009	2.4	1.4	140%
2010	43.3	40.9	1704%
2011	165.5	122.1	282%
2012	203.4	37.9	23%
2013	256.6	49.1	24%
2014	325	68.4	27%
2015	365	41	13%
2016	630	265	73%
2017	695	65	10%
2018	792	97	14%
2019	905.4	113.4	14%
2020	1,196.9	291.5	32%
2021	1,270.4	73.5	%
2022	1,483	212.6	%

== Photovoltaics ==
The 30 MW Cimarron Solar Facility became the largest solar farm in the state in 2011. It was surpassed by the 52 MW Macho Springs Solar Facility in 2014, and by the combined 140 MW Roswell and Chavez County Solar Energy Centers in 2016.

== Net metering ==
As of July 29, 2008, New Mexico has one of the most generous metering laws in the country, and covers all systems up to 80 MW. Excess generation of less than $50 is rolled over to the next month; over that is paid to the consumer.

== Solar thermal ==
As of January 2012, no concentrated solar power (CSP) plants are currently planned for New Mexico since the addition of the first 6 MW in the state in 2011. Though NREL claims the state has the "technical potential" to install 4,860,000 MW of CSP covering 47% of the area of the state, at 2017 prices such a proposal would require a total overnight cost of $18,992,880,000,000 ($18 trillion), or 3,392 times the state's annual budget. Even if such a feat were financially feasible, critics note New Mexico would remain dependent on burning coal and "natural gas" (fossil fuel methane) to compensate for the loss of solar at night and during cloudy weather. Thermal storage permits CSP generation to be stored and used as needed, but with a round-trip efficiency of only 38% it is not currently cost-effective at a scale necessary to maintain grid reliability.

Parabolic trough solar systems have been determined to be the most cost effective large systems, and in July 2008 New Mexico's utilities combined to release an RFP for a parabolic trough solar system to generate from 211,000 and 375,000 megawatt-hours (MW·h) per year by 2012.

== Sandia National Laboratories ==
Sandia National Laboratories has been testing solar thermal devices at Sandia’s National Solar Thermal Test Facility (NSTTF). On January 31, 2008, a Sterling solar dish system set a solar-to-grid system conversion efficiency record of 31.25 percent net efficiency. The previous record was 29.4 percent, set in 1984.

== Solar powered facilities ==
Radio station KTAO, in Taos, is the largest solar powered radio station in the United States.

== See also ==
- Wind power in New Mexico
- Solar power in the United States
- Renewable energy in the United States
