= A Nuevo México =

1911 poem by Luis Tafoya

A Nuevo México (To New Mexico) is the State Poem of the U.S. State of New Mexico. It was written by Luis Tafoya in January, 1911, and it was declared to be the official state poem during the fortieth legislative session, January, 1991. The official version is in both Spanish - as it was originally written - and English.

== See also ==
- List of U.S. state poems
