= Seal of New Mexico =

Official government emblem of the U.S. state of New Mexico

Great Seal of the State of New Mexico
- Armiger: State of New Mexico
- Adopted: 1913
- Motto: Crescit Eundo (It grows as it goes)
- Earlier version
- Use: Seal of the Territory of New Mexico (1887–1912)

The Great Seal of the State of New Mexico is the official seal of the U.S. state of New Mexico. It is enshrined in Article V, Section 10, of the New Mexico State Constitution, which requires a state emblem to be kept by the secretary of state for official documents and other expressions of statehood. Rooted in the official seal of the New Mexico Territory established in 1851, it was adopted in 1913, one year after New Mexico was admitted as the 47th state.

== Design ==
The constitution of New Mexico, which was adopted January 21, 1911, provides no further requirements or specifications for the design thereof. When New Mexico became a state in 1912, its legislature named a commission for the purpose of designing a state seal, consisting of Governor William C. McDonald, Attorney General Frank W. Clancy, Chief Justice Clarence J. Roberts and Secretary of State Antonio Lucero. In June 1913, the commission filed its report adopting the general design of the Territorial Seal, substituting only the date 1912.

The official act of the legislature reads:

The coat of arms of the state shall be the Mexican eagle grasping a serpent in its beak, the cactus in its talons, shielded by the American eagle with outspread wings, and grasping arrows in its talons; the date 1912 under the eagles and, on a scroll, the motto: "Crescit Eundo". The great seal of the state shall be a disc bearing the coat of arms and having around the edge the words "Great Seal of the State of New Mexico.

The "American eagle" is an American bald eagle. The "Mexican eagle" with serpent and cactus is from the coat of arms of Mexico, in turn derived from an Aztec myth of the foundation of the Aztec capital, Tenochtitlan. Although in Mexico the Mexican eagle is understood to be an American golden eagle, the New Mexico seal uses an American harpy eagle. Mexico adopted its coat of arms when it was under Spanish rule, and New Mexico identified with it as well. On the New Mexico seal, it symbolizes that the state still holds on to its Spanish, Mexican and Native American traditions. The Mexican eagle is small and shielded by the larger American eagle, which grasps arrows in its talons, its wings outstretched with its watchful eyes guarding the Mexican eagle. This configuration is meant to show the change of sovereignty in 1846 between Mexico and the United States. It also symbolizes America's dominant yet delicate protection of New Mexico and its heritage and culture.

Originally, New Mexico's territorial seal was engraved with MDCCCL (1850 in Roman numerals) to commemorate the date New Mexico was organized as a territory. But after it was admitted as a state, the commission decided that that was a better date to use on the seal. They decided against using Roman numerals, believing it was too obscure.

Great Seal of the State of New Mexico. No one is quite sure who came up with the term, but it appeared on New Mexico's first state seal, and was added to the seal adopted in 1913, untouched — with the small exception of changing the word "Territory" to "State".

=== Motto ===
The Latin official motto of New Mexico is Crescit eundo, translated literally as "it grows by going", sometimes rendered as "it grows as it goes", the second word being the ablative case of the gerund of the verb eo ("to go). It is taken from the epic poem De Rerum Natura (On the Nature of Things), Book VI, line 341, by the first-century B.C. Roman poet Lucretius, where it refers to a thunderbolt increasing in strength as it moves across the sky, referenced by the selectors of the motto as a symbol of dynamic progress. Lines 340-344:

Denique quod longo venit impete, sumere debet
mobilitatem etiam atque etiam, quae crescit eundo
et validas auget viris et roborat ictum.
Nam facit ut quae sint illius semina cumque
e regione locum quasi in unum cuncta ferantur,
omnia coniciens in eum volventia cursum.
forsitan ex ipso veniens trahat aere quaedam
corpora quae plagis incendunt mobilitatem.

Translated as : Again, because it comes from a long distance, it must acquire more and more mobility which grows by moving and increases its massive strength and hardens its impact. For this causes all the seeds of the thunderbolt to be carried straight onwards, as one may say, into one place, driving them all together as they roll into that single path. Perhaps as it goes it draws from the air itself certain bodies which kindle velocity by their blows.

The motto was first used in 1882, when acting Territorial Secretary William G. Ritch added the Latin phrase Crescit eundo to an early 1860s version of the territorial seal. In 1887, Ritch's version of the seal, including the words Crescit eundo, was adopted by the legislature as part of the official New Mexico Territory seal and coat of arms. When New Mexico became a state in 1912, the Legislature appointed a commission to settle on a design for an official state seal. The commission recommended the territorial seal to be continued as the state seal, including the words Crescit eundo which were then adopted as the official state motto. However, the commission's recommendation that the American and Mexican eagles both be American golden eagles, a change omitted from the 1915 law.

== Historical evolution ==
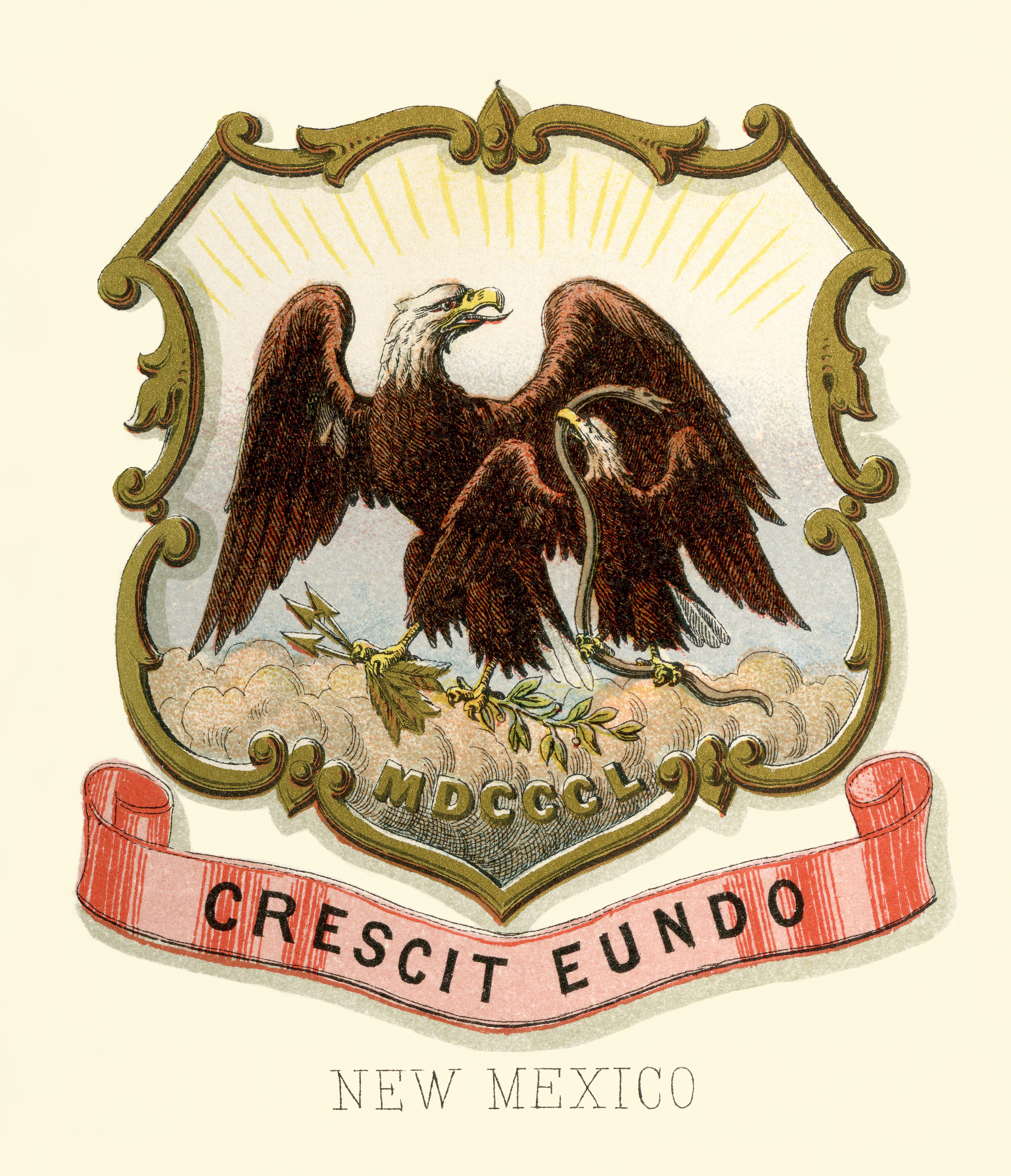
The seal in escutcheon form

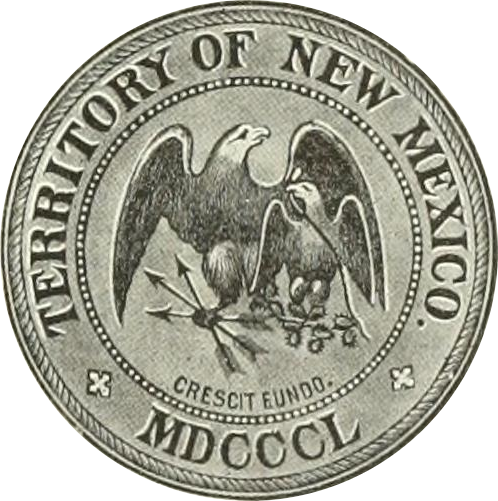
Design of the 1887 seal from Catholic Encyclopedia, 1913

New Mexico's first seal was designed shortly after the organization of the Territorial Government in 1851. The original seal has long since disappeared, possibly as part of the artifacts placed into the cornerstone of the Soldiers' Monument in the Santa Fe Plaza. Imprints of the original seal show it consisted of the American eagle, clutching an olive branch in one talon and three arrows in the other. Along the outside rim was the inscription "Great Seal of the Territory of New Mexico".

In the early 1860s an unknown official adopted a new seal, using a design similar to today's Great Seal. It featured the American bald eagle, its outstretched wings shielding a smaller Mexican eagle. The outside rim of the seal contained the words "Territory of New Mexico," with the date of 1850 along the bottom in Roman numerals.

In 1882, Territorial Secretary W.G. Ritch embellished the earlier design with the phrase crescit eundo. This version was liked so much it was adopted as New Mexico's "official seal and coat of arms" by the Territorial Legislature in 1887. Ritch had no apparent motive for the change, but it fit well.

In the year and half it took the Commission to decide to adopt the State Seal New Mexico uses today, the Legislature authorized interim use of the Territorial Seal with the words "Great Seal of the State of New Mexico" substituted.

== See also ==
- Flag of New Mexico
- Coat of arms of Mexico
