= Questa Solar Facility =

Photovoltaic power station in Questa, New Mexico, USA

- Country: United States
- Location: Questa, New Mexico
- Coordinates: 36°43′01″N 105°36′34″W
- Status: Operational
- Commission date: 2010
- Owner: Chevron Technology Ventures

Solar farm
- Type: CPV
- Site area: 20 acres (8 ha)

Power generation
- Units operational: 173 Concentrix CX-P6
- Nameplate capacity: 1.17 MW_{p}, 1.0 MW_{AC}
- Capacity factor: 21.9% (average 2011-2020)
- Annual net output: 1.92 GWh, 96 MW·h/acre

The Questa Solar Facility is a 1.17 MW_{p} (1.0 MW_{AC}) concentrator photovoltaics (CPV) power station in Questa, New Mexico. Upon its completion in late 2010, it was one of the largest CPV facilities in the world, and the first utility-scale installation of Concentrix Solar technology in the United States. Annual electricity production is expected to average about 2.1 GW·h, and is being sold to the Kit Carson Electric Cooperative under a 20-year power purchase agreement (PPA).

== Facility details ==
The facility was built by Chevron Technology Ventures on a reclaimed site previously used for the collection and storage of molybdenum mine tailings. It consists of 173 dual-axis-tracking CX-P6 systems, each of which supports 90 CX-75 CPV modules. Each module contains 200 Fresnel lens to concentrate sunlight 500 times onto multijunction photovoltaic cells. These features enable higher efficiencies - about 40% for cells and 27% for modules - than other photovoltaic technologies.

Each of the 173 trackers has its own grid-connected inverter, which also serves as the control system of the mechanical tracking and as the communication port with its own IP address. The inverter technology was developed by Fraunhofer ISE in cooperation with Concentrix Solar and has an efficiency of 96%. For control and monitoring, the facility also includes DNI sensors, GNI sensors and wind sensors. A detailed analysis of the system and power plant performance can be made based on data that is taken at one-minute intervals.

== Electricity production ==
Generation (MW·h) of Questa Solar Facility
Year	Jan	Feb	Mar	Apr	May	Jun	Jul	Aug	Sep	Oct	Nov	Dec	Total
2011	129	135	170	173	193	156	162	158	148	157	133	113	1,827
2012	169	171	216	202	232	213	224	187	188	203	170	242	2,417
2013	129	139	177	169	191	182	179	175	168	185	137	131	1,963
2014	93	90	112	108	202	448	372	365	329	349	264	215	2,949
2015	100	133	156	182	192	180	171	177	154	129	119	107	1,798
2016	64	77	96	98	108	98	104	130	156	190	170	142	1,433
2017	82	122	175	188	203	193	184	172	153	157	113	99	1,840
2018	101	119	154	186	215	231	201	201	193	144	119	86	1,947
2019	88	93	138	163	173	195	185	188	155	153	95	69	1,695
2020	78	82	93	130	145	136	133	126	111	106	85	78	1,302
Average Annual Production for years 2011-2020 --->													1,917

== See also ==
- Alamosa Solar Generating Project
- Hatch Solar Energy Center
- Newberry Springs CPV Power Plant
- List of photovoltaic power stations
- Renewable energy in the United States
- Solar power in New Mexico
- Solar power in the United States
