= University of Arizona CPV Array =

Power station in Tucson, Arizona

- Country: United States
- Location: Tucson, Arizona
- Coordinates: 32°06′29″N 110°49′29″W
- Status: Operational
- Commission date: 2012
- Owner: Arzon Solar

Solar farm
- Type: CPV
- Site area: 12 acres (5 ha)

Power generation
- Units operational: 34 Amonix 7700
- Nameplate capacity: 2.38 MW_{p}, 2.0 MW_{AC}
- Capacity factor: 20% (per estimated annual prod.)
- Annual net output: 3.5 GW·h, 290 MW·h/acre

The University of Arizona CPV Array is a 2.38 MW_{p} (2.0 MW_{AC}) concentrator photovoltaics (CPV) power station in Tucson, Arizona. It consists of 34 Amonix 7700 systems constructed in the Solar Zone of the UA Tech Park, home of Tech Parks Arizona. ' It uses all three of the methods available to increase efficiency: dual-axis tracking, Fresnel lens sunlight concentrators, and multi-junction cells. The annual electricity production is expected to be about 3.5 GW·h, and is being sold to Tucson Electric Power (TEP) under a 20-year power purchase agreement (PPA).

== Electricity production ==
Generation (MW·h) of UASTP CPV Array
Year	Jan	Feb	Mar	Apr	May	Jun	Jul	Aug	Sep	Oct	Nov	Dec	Total
2011	0	0	0	722	680	565	438	439	488	546	519	377	4,774
2012	51	61	79	124	424	479	496	533	536	547	454	412	4,196
2013	135	169	198	226	256	283	275	270	288	400	265	255	3,018
2014	118	119	168	176	206	209	192	170	179	162	127	86	1,913
2015	44	62	84	103	104	106	102	109	87	77	70	59	1,009
2016	60	73	86	92	113	110	114	91	84	83	67	65	1,036
2017	3	4	7	8	8	9	6	7	7	7	4	4	75

== See also ==
- Alamosa Solar Generating Project
- Hatch Solar Energy Center
- List of photovoltaic power stations
- Renewable energy in the United States
- Solar power in the United States
