= List of power stations in New Mexico =

Sources of New Mexico utility-scale electricity generation in gigawatt-hours, full-year 2025:
1. Wind: 14,215 (36.2%)
2. Natural gas: 10,507 (26.8%)
3. Coal: 8,182 (20.8%)
4. Solar: 6,104 (15.5%)
5. Hydroelectric: 185 (0.47%)
6. Geothermal: 58 (0.15%)
7. Biomass: 16 (0.04%)

This is a list of electricity-generating power stations in the U.S. state of New Mexico, sorted by type and name. In 2024, New Mexico had a total summer capacity of 11.9 GW through all of its power plants, and a net generation of 39,697 GWh. The electrical energy generation mix in 2025 was 36.2% wind, 26.8% natural gas, 20.8% coal, and 15.5% solar. Biomass, geothermal, and hydroelectric generated less than a 1% share combined.

Small-scale solar including customer-owned photovoltaic panels delivered an additional net 841 GWh to New Mexico's electricity grid in 2025. This was less than one-seventh of the amount generated by the state's utility-scale photovoltaic plants.

New Mexico hosts the nation's only long-term underground repository for waste from nuclear weapons research and production, the Waste Isolation Pilot Plant near Carlsbad. Extraction of the state's nearby Permian Basin oil reserves for transportation and other uses rose to the nation's third highest, contributing 6% of total U.S. production in 2018. New Mexico's oil extraction included the flaring of over 35 billion cubic feet of associated petroleum gas in each of the years 2018 and 2019. This amount of wasted natural gas could have generated about 5,000 GWh of electrical energy, an amount equal to 14% of the state's total annual generation.

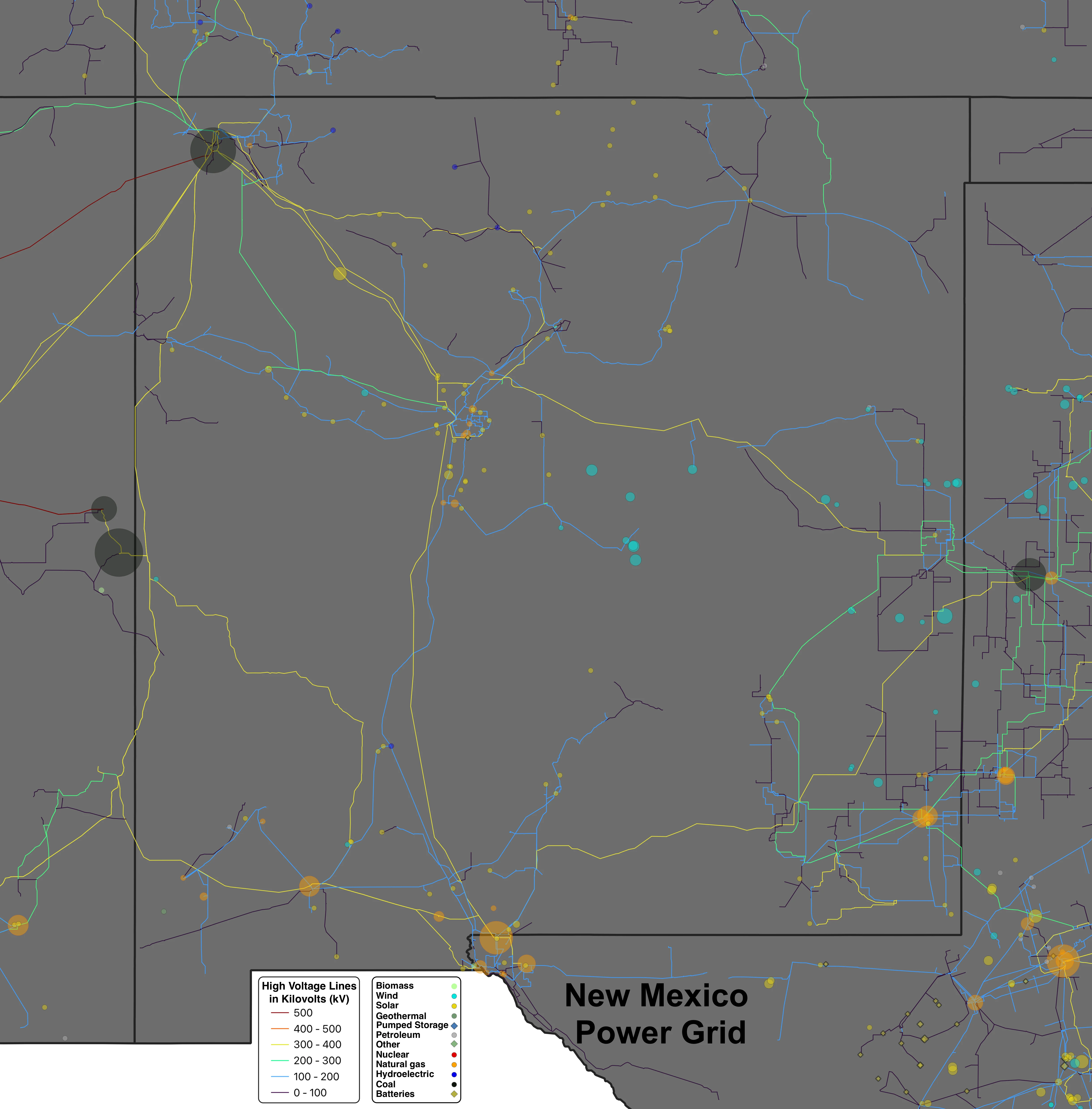
New Mexico power grid

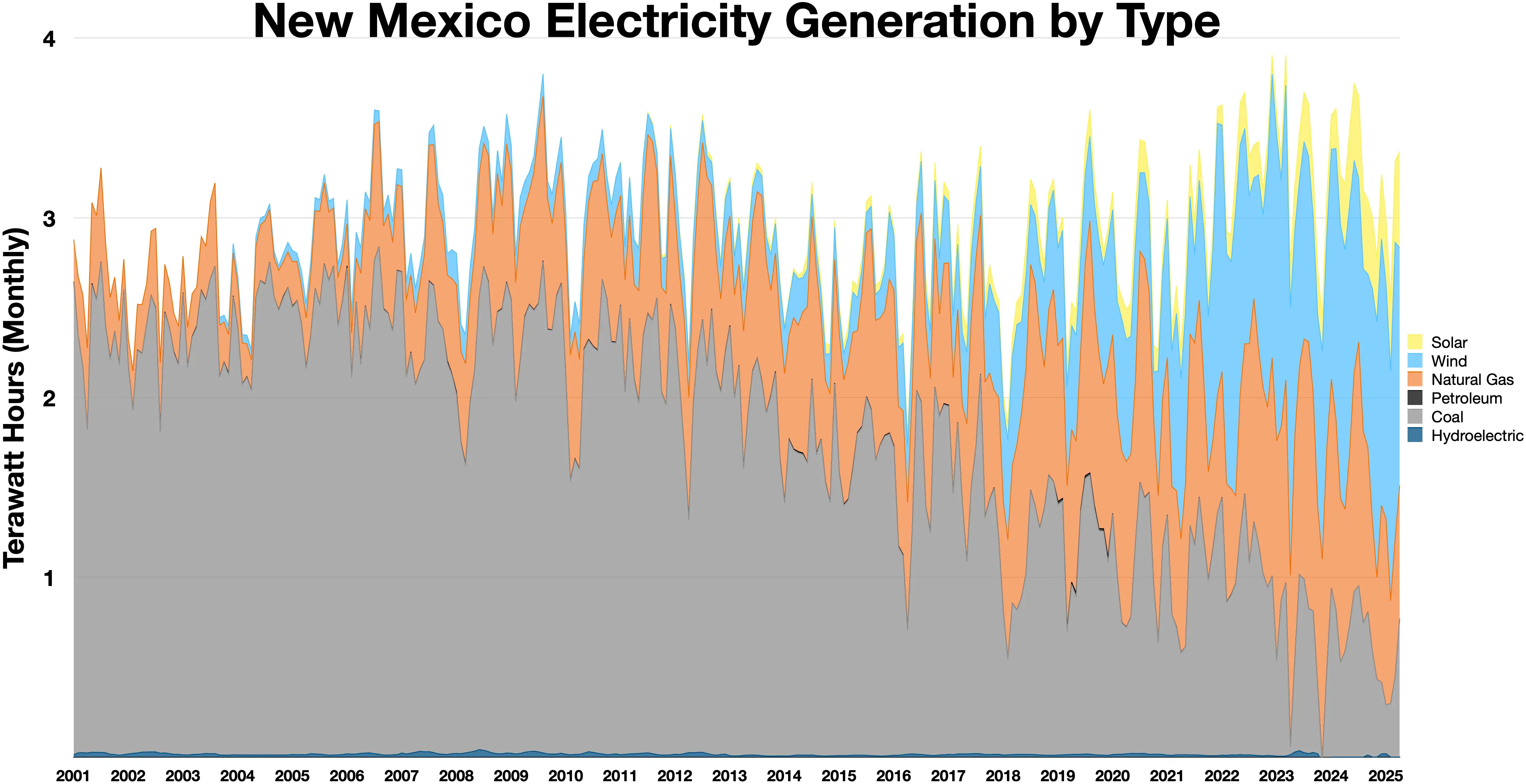
New Mexico electricity generation by type

== Fossil-fuel power stations ==
Data from the U.S. Energy Information Administration serves as a general reference.

=== Coal ===
Name	Image	Location	Coordinates	Capacity (MW)	Year opened	Scheduled retirement	Ref
Four Corners Generating Station		San Juan County	36°41′24″N 108°28′53″W	1,636	1969 (Unit 4); 1970 (Unit 5)	Units 1, 2 & 3 closed in 2013. Unit 4 & 5 - 2031.	
San Juan Generating Station		San Juan County	36°48′02″N 108°26′19″W	924	1973 (Unit 1); 1982 (Unit 4)	Units 2 and 3 closed in 2017. Station closed in Oct 2022.	
Escalante Generating Station		McKinley County	35°24′57″N 108°04′55″W	257	1984	Station closed in Aug 2020.	

=== Petroleum ===
Name	Location	Coordinates	Capacity (MW)	Generation Type	Operator	Year opened	Ref	Note
Freeport McMoRan	Grant County	32.6618°N 108.3628°W	30.5	Reciprocating engine (x10)	Public Service Co of NM	1967/1972		
Quay County	Quay County	35.1828°N 103.7311°W	27	Simple cycle	Southwestern Public Service	2013		

=== Natural gas ===
Name	Location	Coordinates	Capacity (MW)	Generation type	Operator	Year opened	Ref	Note
Afton	Dona Ana County	32.1142°N 106.8465°W	287	1x1 Combined cycle	Public service Co of NM	2002/2007		
Algodones	Sandoval County	35.3844°N 106.4642°W	45	Steam turbine (x3)	Public Service Co of NM	1954/1959		Decommissioned in 1987.
Animas	San Juan County	36.7251°N 108.1920°W	18	Simple cycle	City of Farmington	1994		
Bluffview	San Juan County	36.7166°N 108.2153°W	67	1x1 combined cycle	City of Farmington	2005		
Chino Hurley Mines	Grant County	32.6956°N 108.1225°W	54	1x1 combined cycle	Freeport McMoRan Corp	1959/2001		
Cunningham	Lea County	32.7131°N 103.3533°W	519	Steam turbine (x2), simple cycle (x2)	Southwestern Public Service Co	1957/1965/ 1998		
Ford Utilities	Bernalillo County	35.0841°N 106.6252°W	13.7	Simple cycle (x2)	University of New Mexico	2005/2014		
Hobbs	Lea County	32.7283°N 103.3094°W	665	2x1 combined cycle, simple cycle	Lea Power Partners	2008		
La Luz	Valencia County	34.6161°N 106.8150°W	42.3	Simple cycle	Public Service Co of NM	2015		
LCEC Generation	Lea County	32.9781°N 103.3239°W	46.5	Reciprocating engine (x5)	Western Farmers Elec Coop, Inc	2012		
Lordsburg	Hidalgo County	32.3505°N 108.6980°W	88	Simple cycle (x2)	Public Service Co of NM	2002		
Luna	Luna County	32.2993°N 107.7834°W	650	2x1 combined cycle	Public Service Co of NM	2006		
Maddox	Lea County	32.7142°N 103.3015°W	212	Steam turbine, simple cycle (x2)	Southwestern Public Service Co	1963/1967/ 1976		
Pyramid	Hidalgo County	32.2363°N 108.5494°W	186	Simple cycle (x4)	Tri-State G & T Assn, Inc	2003		
Reeves	Bernalillo County	35.1710°N 106.6019°W	154	Steam turbine (x3)	Public Service Co of NM	1960/1962		
Rio Bravo	Bernalillo County	35.0260°N 106.6440°W	150	Simple cycle	Public Service Co of NM	2000		
Rio Grande	Dona Ana County	31.8047°N 106.5472°W	372	Steam turbine (x3), simple cycle	El Paso Electric Co	1957/1958/1972/2013		
Valencia	Valencia County	34.6115°N 106.7322°W	159.5	Simple cycle	Valencia Power LLC	2008		

== Renewable power stations ==
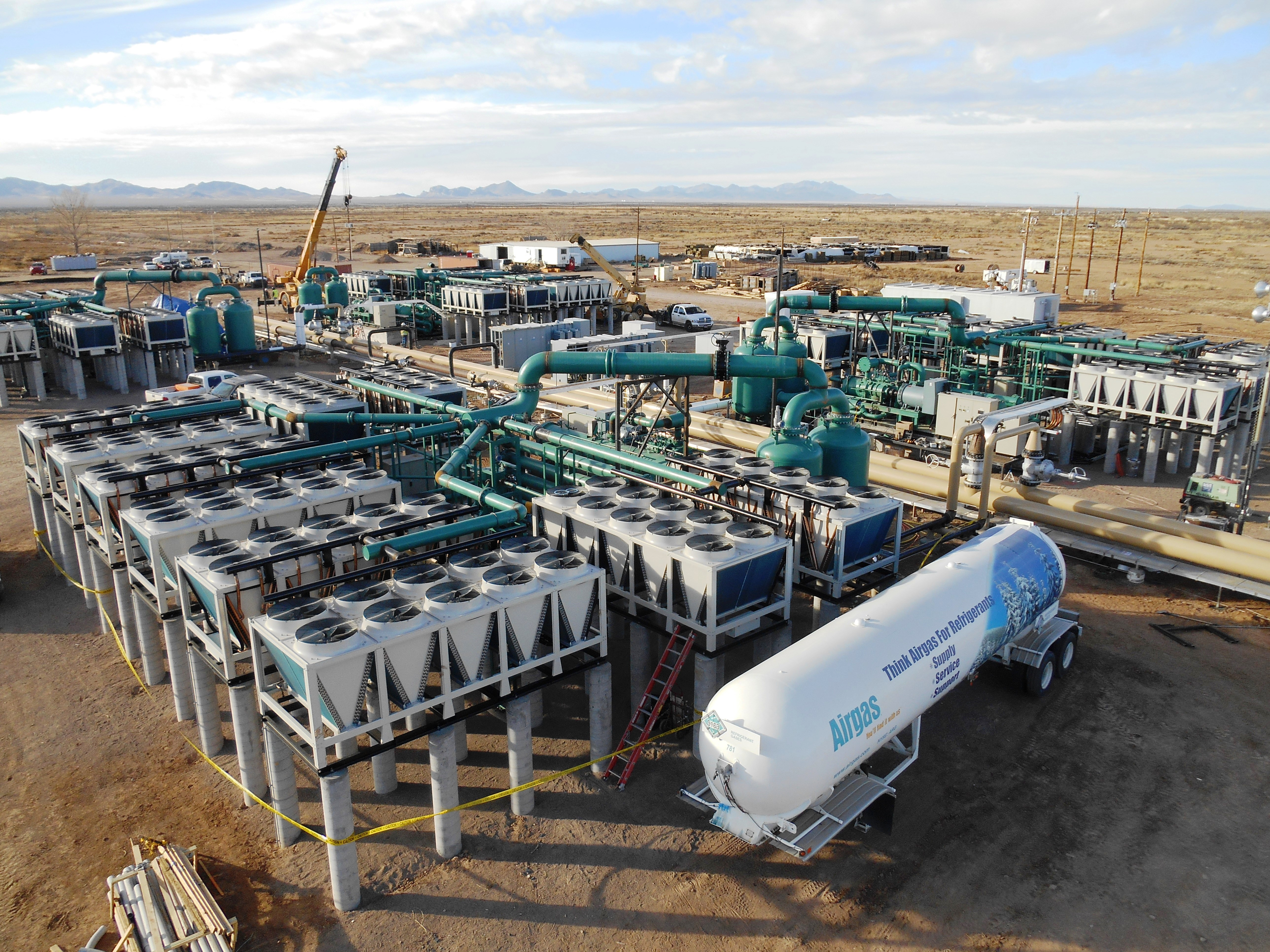
Lightning Dock Geothermal Plant

Data from the U.S. Energy Information Administration serves as a general reference.

=== Geothermal ===
Name	Location	Coordinates	Capacity (MW)	Operator	Year opened	Ref	Note
Lightning Dock	Animas, New Mexico	32.1447°N 108.8383°W	4.0	Cyrq Energy	2014		

=== Biomass ===
Name	Location	Coordinates	Capacity (MW)	Generation type	Fuel	Operator	Year opened	Ref	Note
Four Peaks Camino Real	Dona Ana County	31.79116°N 106.58547°W	3.2	Reciprocating engine (x2)	Landfill gas	ENERGYneering Solutions	2008		
Southside Water Reclamation	Bernalillo County	35.0161°N 106.6697°W	2.2	Reciprocating engine (x2)	Wastewater methane	City of Albuquerque	1987		

=== Hydroelectric ===
Name	Location	Coordinates	Capacity (MW)	Operator	Year opened	Ref
Abiquiu Dam	Abiquiu Lake	36.2399°N 106.4230°W	16.5	Los Alamos County	1994	
El Vado Dam	El Vado Lake	36.5928°N 106.7321°W	8.0	Los Alamos County	1935	
Elephant Butte Dam	Elephant Butte	33.1534°N 107.1920°W	28	United States Bureau of Reclamation	1916	
Navajo Dam	Navajo Lake	36.8061°N 107.6131°W	30	City of Farmington	1989	

=== Solar photovoltaic ===
Name	Location	Capacity (MW_{AC})	Year opened	Ref
Buena Vista Energy Center	32°4′0″N 106°17′7″W	120	2023	
Roswell Solar Energy Center	33°27′11″N 104°27′40″W	70	2016	
Chavez County Solar Energy Center	33°27′00″N 104°27′22″W	70	2016	
Macho Springs Solar Facility	32°34′12″N 107°28′48″W	52	2014	
NMRD Data Center III	35°22′15″N 106°51′14″W	50	2023	
Jicarilla Solar 1	36°19′0″N 107°16′39″W	50	2023	
Jicarilla Solar 2	36°8′29″N 107°10′16″W	50	2022	
Britton Solar Energy Center	35°0′58″N 106°5′53″W	50	2019	
Route 66 Energy Center	35°5′54″N 107°36′53″W	49.5	2022	
Encino Solar Energy Center	35°21′14″N 106°51′29″W	50	2020	
Chaves County Solar II	33°26′4″N 104°26′51″W	30	2023	
Cimarron Solar Facility	36°28′N 104°38′W	30	2011	
Alta Luna Solar Facility	32°34′19″N 107°29′11″W	28	2016	
Caprock Solar Facility	34°58′58″N 103°22′42″W	25	2017	
Hayhurst New Mexico Solar	32°4′15″N 104°9′42″W	20	2023	
Facebook 2-3 Solar Energy Center Bernalillo County	35°04′48″N 106°51′54″W	20	2018	
San Miguel Solar Energy Center	35°38′4″N 105°10′42″W	20	2019	
Roadrunner Solar Electric Facility	31°48′N 106°40′W	20	2011	
Taos Mesa Energy Facility Hybrid	36°25′24″N 105°37′12″W	15	2022	
Las Cruces Centennial Solar Farm	32°15′06″N 106°54′48″W	12	2012	
Santolina Solar Energy Center	35°01′06″N 106°51′20″W	10.5	2015	
SunE SPS4 Monument	32°40′55″N 103°18′13″W	10.1	2011	
SunE SPS5 Hopi	32°20′44″N 104°14′05″W	10.1	2011	
SunE SPS1 Dollarhide	32°07′39″N 103°08′16″W	10	2011	
SunE SPS2 Jal	32°11′01″N 103°10′59″W	10	2011	
SunE SPS3 Lea	32°28′11″N 103°19′24″W	10	2011	
South Valley Solar Energy Center	34°59′10″N 106°44′10″W	10	2015	
Rio Communities Solar Energy Center	34°34′57″N 106°40′59″W	10	2015	
Rio Rancho Solar Energy Center	35°6′17″N 106°28′57″W	10	2019	
Facebook 1 Solar Energy Center Valencia County	34°49′52″N 106°45′43″W	10	2017	
Vista Solar Energy Center	34°44′28″N 106°39′18″W	10	2019	
Rio De Oro Solar Energy Center	34°41′32″N 106°41′17″W	10	2019	
Angel Fire Energy Facility	36°25′1″N 105°16′51″W	9.8	2023	
Santa Fe Solar Energy Center	35°33′41″N 106°05′10″W	9.5	2015	
Meadow Lake Solar Energy Center	34°48′36″N 106°31′12″W	9.1	2015	
Manzano Solar	34°44′48″N 106°39′16″W	8.4	2013	
Otero Solar	32°58′35″N 105°58′16″W	8	2013	
City of Gallup Solar	35°31′20″N 108°46′44″W	8	2018	
Hatch Solar Energy Center	32°37′34″N 107°15′32″W	5	2011	
Eubank Landfill Solar Array	35°02′57″N 106°31′48″W	2	2013	
Questa Solar Facility	36°43′01″N 105°36′34″W	1	2010	
Los Alamos Photovoltaic Site	35°52′32″N 106°18′36″W	1	2012	

=== Wind ===
Name	Location	Capacity (MW)	Year opened	Ref
Sagamore Wind	33°56′18″N 103°11′5″W	522	2020	
Red Cloud Wind	34°16′27″N 105°25′22″W	350	2021	
Clines Corners Wind Farm	34°21′24″N 105°26′12″W	325	2021	
Broadview Wind Project	36°44′03″N 103°06′29″W	324	2017	
La Joya Wind Farm	34°48′36″N 105°44′24″W	306	2021	
El Cabo Wind Farm	34°39′04″N 105°27′42″W	298	2018	
Tecolote Wind	34°21′36″N 105°26′24″W	272	2021	
Oso Grande Wind Farm	32°55′56″N 103°39′59″W	250	2021	
Roosevelt Wind Farm	33°55′34″N 103°30′40″W	250	2015	
Grady Wind Energy Center	34°44′03″N 103°05′32″W	220.5	2019	
New Mexico Wind Energy Center	34°38′08″N 104°02′50″W	204	2003	
Aragonne Mesa Wind Project	34°48′53″N 105°0′40″W	145	2022	
San Juan Mesa Wind Farm	33°58′11″N 103°51′00″W	120	2006	
Duran Mesa Wind Farm	34°23′36″N 105°29′32″W	105	2021	
Red Mesa Wind Energy Center	35°16′08″N 107°22′58″W	102.4	2010	
Borderlands Wind	34°9′35″N 108°53′40″W	100	2021	
High Lonesome Mesa Wind Farm	34°28′00″N 105°57′45″W	100	2009	
Aragonne Wind	34°48′53″N 105°00′39″W	90	2006	
Caprock Wind Ranch	34°58′58″N 103°22′42″W	80	2005	
Casa Mesa Wind Energy Center	34°36′18″N 103°57′58″W	50.9	2018	
Macho Springs Wind Facility	32°33′16″N 107°30′33″W	50	2011	
Milo Wind Project	33°54′06″N 103°20′49″W	50	2016	
Sterling Wind Facility	33°21′35″N 103°15′02″W	29.9	2017	
Wildcat Wind Facility	32°57′10″N 103°17′07″W	27.3	2012	
Anderson Wind Project	33°00′50″N 103°51′54″W	15	2014	

== Storage power stations ==
=== Battery storage ===
Name	Coordinates	Discharge capacity (MW)	Year completed	Refs
Taos Mesa Energy Facility Hybrid	36°25′24″N 105°37′12″W	15	2022	
NMSU Storage and Solar	32°17′10″N 106°44′40″W	1	2022	
Casa Mesa Wind Energy Center Hybrid	34°36′18″N 103°57′58″W	1	2018	
Prosperity Energy Storage Facility Hybrid	35°0′7″N 106°38′14″W	1	2011	
