= Desert Green Solar Farm =

Concentrated photovoltaic power station in California, USA

- Country: United States
- Location: Borrego Springs, California
- Coordinates: 33°15′56″N 116°19′41″W
- Status: Operational
- Construction began: April 2014
- Commission date: December 2014
- Owner: Invenergy
- Operator: Invenergy

Solar farm
- Type: CPV
- Site area: 45 acres (18 ha)

Power generation
- Units operational: 299 Soitec CX-S530
- Nameplate capacity: 8.8 MW_{p}, 6.3 MW_{AC}
- Capacity factor: 25.9% (average 2015-2020)
- Annual net output: 14.3 GW·h, 317 MW·h/acre

The Desert Green Solar Farm is a 8.8 MW_{p} (6.3 MW_{AC}) concentrator photovoltaics (CPV) power station in Borrego Springs, California. It was built by Blattner Energy using 299 dual-axis CX-S530 systems, each of which contains 12 CX-M500 modules. Each module contains 2,400 Fresnel lenses to concentrate sunlight 500 times onto multi-junction solar cells, allowing a greater efficiency than other photovoltaic power plants. The output is being sold to San Diego Gas & Electric under a 25-year Power Purchase Agreement.

== Electricity production ==
Generation (MW·h) of Desert Green Solar
Year	Jan	Feb	Mar	Apr	May	Jun	Jul	Aug	Sep	Oct	Nov	Dec	Total
2014											571	390	961
2015	738	931	1364	1531	1539	1585	1641	1661	1371	1155	1070	880	15,465
2016	549	916	1011	1178	1464	1404	1639	1616	1426	1202	1033	753	14,189
2017	533	595	1113	1187	1514	1640	1494	1382	1288	1186	733	771	13,437
2018	626	881	1007	1259	1518	1636	1414	1424	1348	1062	730	581	13,485
2019	712	831	1263	1468	1529	1848	1824	1787	1461	1342	859	553	15,478
2020	704	955	934	1177	1541	1534	1733	1436	1127	1042	824	652	13,661
Average Annual Production for years 2015-2020:													14,286

== See also ==
- Touwsrivier CPV Solar Project
- Newberry Springs CPV Power Plant
- Solar power in California
- Solar power in the United States
- Renewable portfolio standard
