= Victor Valley College Solar Farm =

- Country: United States
- Location: Victorville, California
- Coordinates: 34°28′49″N 117°15′29″W
- Status: Operational
- Commission date: 2010
- Owner: Victor Valley Community College

Solar farm
- Type: CPV
- Site area: 6.0 acres (2 ha)

Power generation
- Units operational: 122 Solfocus SF-1100S
- Nameplate capacity: 1.26 MW_{p}, 1.02 MW_{AC}
- Capacity factor: 25% (average 2011-2016)
- Annual net output: 2.2 GW·h, 370 MW·h/acre

The Victor Valley College Solar Farm is a 1.26 MW_{p} (1.02 MW_{AC}) concentrator photovoltaics (CPV) power station in Victorville, California. Upon completion in May 2010 it was the largest CPV project installed in North America. It was built by Sachs Electric using 122 dual-axis SF-1100S systems, each of which contains 28 SF-1100 modules. Each module contains reflective optics to concentrate sunlight 650 times onto multi-junction solar cells, allowing a greater efficiency than other photovoltaic power plants. The farm was constructed under California Solar Initiative (CSI) incentives and the projected annual output of 2.3 GW·h partially satisfies electricity consumption at the college.

== Electricity production ==
Generation (MW·h) of Victor Valley CC CPV Solar
Year	Jan	Feb	Mar	Apr	May	Jun	Jul	Aug	Sep	Oct	Nov	Dec	Total
2010						639	617	551	448	201	172	64	2691
2011	2	114	164	271	333	428	368	379	262	209	74	70	2675
2012	8	79	194	281	386	417	361	284	266	209	107	78	2671
2013	40	82	140	147	166	211	199	268	261	231	230	240	2216
2014	72	82	144	171	196	218	201	218	212	192	159	109	1974
2015	92	116	171	192	193	198	205	208	171	144	134	110	1935
2016	64	107	118	137	171	164	191	188	166	140	120	88	1654
2017	43	48	90	96	122	133	121	112	104	96	59	62	1086
2018	52	73	83	104	126	135	117	118	111	88	60	48	1115
2019	56	65	98	114	119	144	142	139	114	105	67	43	1206
2020	71	96	94	119	155	155	175	145	114	105	83	66	1376
Average Annual Production for years 2011-2016:													2,190

== See also ==
- Crafton Hills College Solar Farm
- Alamosa Solar Generating Project
- Solar power in California
- Renewable energy in the United States
- Renewable portfolio standard
