= Crafton Hills College Solar Farm =

Concentrator photovoltaics (CPV) power station in Yucaipa, California

- Country: United States
- Location: Yucaipa, California
- Coordinates: 34°02′35″N 117°05′56″W
- Status: Operational
- Commission date: 2012
- Owner: Crafton Hills College

Solar farm
- Type: CPV
- Site area: 7.5 acres (3 ha)

Power generation
- Units operational: 140 Solfocus SF-1100S
- Nameplate capacity: 1.61 MW_{p}, 1.30 MW_{AC}
- Capacity factor: 14.5% (average 2013-2016)
- Annual net output: 1.65 GW·h, 220 MW·h/acre

The Crafton Hills College Solar Farm is a 1.61 MW_{p} (1.30 MW_{AC}) concentrator photovoltaics (CPV) power station in Yucaipa, California. It was built by Rosendin Electric using 140 dual-axis SF-1100S systems, each of which contains 28 SF-1100 modules. Each module contains reflective optics to concentrate sunlight 650 times onto multi-junction solar cells, allowing a greater efficiency than other photovoltaic power plants. The farm was constructed under California Solar Initiative (CSI) incentives and the projected annual output of 2.7 GW·h partially satisfies electricity consumption at the college.

== Electricity production ==
Generation (MW·h) of Crafton Hills College Solar Farm
Year	Jan	Feb	Mar	Apr	May	Jun	Jul	Aug	Sep	Oct	Nov	Dec	Total
2012						210	181	143	134	105	54	39	866
2013	26	54	92	97	109	139	131	177	172	152	151	158	1460
2014	46	52	92	109	125	138	128	138	135	122	101	69	1255
2015	100	126	184	207	208	214	222	224	185	156	145	119	2090
2016	70	117	129	150	186	179	209	206	181	153	131	96	1806
2017	-16	-17	-33	-35	-44	-48	-44	-41	-38	-35	-22	-23	-394
2018	37	52	60	75	90	97	84	85	80	63	43	35	803
2019	70	81	123	144	150	181	178	175	143	131	84	54	1514
2020	71	96	94	118	154	154	174	144	113	104	83	65	1368
Average Annual Production for years 2013-2016:													1,650

== See also ==
- Victor Valley College Solar Farm
- Alamosa Solar Generating Project
- List of photovoltaic power stations
- Renewable energy in the United States
- Renewable portfolio standard
- Solar power in the United States
