= Concentrix Solar =

German solar power company

Concentrix Solar GmbH was a German solar power company based in Freiburg, Germany, that specialized in developing and commercializing concentrator photovoltaics (CPV) technology. In December 2009, Concentrix Solar was acquired by the French Soitec Group. In January 2015, Soitec announced its intention to exit from the CPV business, citing a lack of sales due to competition from lower-cost conventional photovoltaics. An agreed sale of the business to Chinese firm ConcenSolar (an entity having ties with Suncore Photovoltaics) in May 2015 was not completed. In January 2017, the technology and manufacturing assets were acquired by Saint-Augustin Canada Electric (a former General Electric subsidiary).

== History ==
Concentrix Solar was founded in 2005, as a spin-off company of the Fraunhofer Institute for Solar Energy Systems ISE. Concentrix Solar builds large concentrator solar power plants suitable for sunny areas. In 2007, Concentrix Solar was awarded the Innovation Award of the German Economy for its CPV technology. From February 2006 to December 2009, the investment company Good Energies was invested in Concentrix Solar. Abengoa Solar was an investor of Concentrix Solar from November 2007 to December 2009.

== Technology development ==
Concentrix concentrator photovoltaics (CPV) modules bundle sunlight up to 500 times with the use of Fresnel lenses and focus it on III-V based triple-junction solar cells (GaInP/GaInAs/Ge), which then convert the light into electrical energy. To ensure that the sunlight is concentrated precisely on the solar cell the CPV modules are installed on a two-axis sun tracking system. With its technology, Concentrix Solar achieves a module efficiency of 27%.

== Technology commercialization ==
Concentrix's tracker and CPV module technologies have been installed in 28 countries worldwide. The largest installation is the 44 MW_{p} (36 MW_{AC}) CPV1 generator completed in 2014 and located near Touws River, South Africa. As of 2019, it is the second largest CPV power station in the world.

== See also ==
- Amonix
- Skyline Solar
