= Amonix =

Former US solar power manufacturer

- Type: Private
- Industry: Solar power Electric utility Sustainable energy
- Founded: 1989
- Founder: Vahan Garboushian
- Fate: Acquired by Arzon Solar, LLC
- Headquarters: 33°45′33″N 118°4′57″W, Seal Beach, California, United States
- Products: Concentrated Photovoltaic Solar Power Systems
- Number of employees: 30 (2014)
- Website: amonix.com

Amonix, Inc. was a solar power system developer based in Seal Beach, California. The company manufactured concentrator photovoltaic (CPV) products designed for installation in sunny and dry climates. CPV products convert sunlight into electrical energy in the same way that conventional solar photovoltaic technology does, except that they use optics to focus the solar radiation before the light is absorbed by solar cells. According to a comparative study of energy production of solar technologies, CPV systems require no water for energy production and produce more energy per megawatt (MW) installed than traditional PV systems. Amonix had nearly 70 megawatts (direct current) of CPV solar power systems deployed globally, including Southwestern U.S. and Spain.

== History ==
In May 2012, the Alamosa Solar Generating Project, owned and operated by Cogentrix Energy, began commercial operation. This was the largest CPV power plant in the world and was expected to produce enough clean renewable energy per year to power more than 6,500 homes and will avoid the emissions of over 43,000 metric tons of carbon dioxide per year. The Alamosa Solar Generating Project is supported by a power purchase agreement (PPA), which is a long-term agreement to sell the power it will generate. Under the project's PPA, the Public Service Company of Colorado will buy the power generated by the solar facility for the next 20 years. In July 2012, Amonix set the world record for photovoltaic module efficiency at 33.5% (full regression analysis) under nominal operating conditions, verified by the National Renewable Energy Laboratory. In April 2013, Amonix broke the record set in July 2012, demonstrating photovoltaic module efficiency at 34.9% (full regression analysis) under normal concentrator standard operating conditions, also verified by the National Renewable Energy Laboratory. In August 2013, Amonix announced it had achieved a 35.9% photovoltaic module efficiency rating under concentrator standard test conditions (CSTC) as calculated by NREL. In June, 2014, the assets of Amonix were acquired by Arzon Solar, LLC for the purpose of continued development of CPV technology and products.

== History ==
Amonix was founded in 1989 by CPV solar technology developer, Vahan Garboushian, its current chief executive officer and chairman of the board of directors. Sewang Yoon who developed high efficiency silicon back junction solar cell for HCPV application was co-founder of Amonix. The company began research and development of large-scale CPV solar power systems for the electric utility industry in 1990. Since then Amonix has developed seven generations of progressively advancing CPV solar power systems.

In 1994, the company won R&D Magazine's R&D 100 award for silicon solar cell performance with record conversion efficiency. According to the Department of Energy, Amonix developed the world's most efficient silicon solar cell in 2005, achieving a sunlight-to electricity conversion efficiency of 27.6 percent, which still holds the world record for efficiency of an augmented multi-sun silicon cell.

In 2007, the company began incorporating multijunction solar cell technology originally developed for the space industry into its modular design. The system contains several photovoltaic solar cells which are combined to boost power production even further. Once connected the cells become modules that can be combined into arrays to provide increasing levels of solar power. Amonix has achieved a world record 34.9% outdoor efficiency and 36.2% peak efficiency in its modules.

Amonix opened its 78,000-square-foot (7,200 m^{2}) headquarters in Seal Beach, Cal., in 2008. In December 2009 the company acquired Sunworks Solar LLC, a solar manufacturing plant developer. Sunworks' co-founder and chief executive officer, Brian Robertson, became Amonix CEO as part of the restructuring.

== Funding ==
Amonix received $129.4 million in a Series B financing round, which closed in April 2010. Amonix previously raised $25 million in Series A funding, and also received $15.6 million in cost-share grant funding through the DOE's Solar America Initiative to improve the reliability and reduce the cost of solar electricity to meet national goals (measured as the levelized cost of electricity) of 6 cents per kilowatt hour by 2015.

In addition to the DOE, Amonix investors include Kleiner Perkins Caufield & Byers, MissionPoint Capital Partners, Angeleno Group, PCG Clean Energy & Technology Fund, Vendanta Capital, New Silk Route, The Westly Group, Adams Street Partners, and Goldman Sachs.

In 2011, Amonix won a $4.5 million United States Department of Energy SunShot partnership award under Extreme Balance of System Hardware Reduction to develop a new dual axis tracking system specifically for CPV systems.

== Technology ==
Amonix employs concentrated photovoltaic technology systems which require no water in power production and produce more energy per acre than any other solar technology. CPV technology uses optics to focus large amounts of sunlight onto small photovoltaic surfaces to generate electricity. CPV systems are the most efficient solar energy systems and produce the most energy in dry, sunny climates, where the solar radiation averages 6 kilowatt-hours per square meter per day (6 kW-hr/m2/day) or more. According to the research firm, Global Data, the average cell, module and system efficiencies for CPV systems are expected to reach 50.37 percent, 39.48 percent and 34.03 percent, respectively.

Originally used for space-based applications, the CPV technology was adapted to utility-scale application by Amonix to take advantage of the improved energy efficiencies it offers over the previous silicon-based technology.

The multijunction solar cells used in Amonix CPV systems work by layering semiconductor materials that have different band gaps. Sunlight enters the layer that has the largest band gap and each photon continues to penetrate the solar cell until it reaches the layer that has a smaller band gap than its energy. In this way, multijunction solar cells are more efficient than single layer solar cells because less of the photon's energy is lost to heat when it exceeds the band gap of the absorbing semiconductor material.

Used in conjunction with concentrator optics such as Fresnel lenses, multijunction solar cells are capable of converting sunlight into electricity exceeding 40 percent efficiency. This efficiency rises as the level of concentration increases, but decreases as temperature increases. The Amonix CPV system is designed to keep the cell temperature as low as possible using passive air-cooling.

Amonix CPV systems use refractive Fresnel lenses to focus sunlight 500 times onto multijunction solar cells. The Amonix CPV system is composed of seven proprietary MegaModules™, each with 36 acrylic lenses and multijunction solar cell collector plates. A dual-axis mounting structure tracks the sun throughout the day as the lenses collect sunlight. MegaModules™ are mounted to a patented hydraulic drive tracking structure. The Amonix tracking system follows the sun from dawn to dusk to maintain the sun's focus on the solar cell. This ensures that the system generates close to peak power output throughout the day and produces more energy to better match power demand from utilities.

In February 2013, Amonix signed a Joint Development Agreement (JDA) with solar cell designer and manufacturer Solar Junction for the purpose of continuing to increase CPV performance and drive down cost by combining efforts of the companies.

In April 2013, Amonix broke its own world record for photovoltaic module efficiency at 34.9% (full regression analysis) under nominal operating conditions, verified by the National Renewable Energy Laboratory (NREL). In discussing the result and plans for the future, Amonix Founder and then CTO Vahan Garboushian recently stated that, "plenty of headroom remains for Amonix to confidently achieve a 40 percent module efficiency in the foreseeable future.".

In August 2013, Amonix announced that it had achieved a rating of 35.9% (full regression analysis) under standard concentrator test conditions (CSTC), calculated by NREL. In the press release Amonix comments that the CSTC result is a direct comparison to PV module efficiencies which are often reported under standard test conditions.

== CPV installations ==
- Cogentrix Energy 30MW Solar Generating Power Plant
- NextEra Energy 5MW Solar Generating Power Plant
- Amonix Manufacturing Facility, North Las Vegas, Nevada, United States
- Southern Nevada Water Authority River Mountains Water Treatment Facility, Henderson, Nevada, United States
- University of Nevada, Las Vegas Center for Energy Research, Las Vegas, Nevada, United States
- NV Energy Clark Generating Station, Las Vegas, Nevada, United States
- APS Solar Test And Research Facility, Tempe, Arizona, United States
- Cal Poly Pomona Lyle Center for Regenerative Studies, Pomona, California, United States
- University of California, Irvine, California, United States
- Granite Construction Asphalt Concrete and Aggregate Facility, Indio, California, United States
- The Solar Zone at the University of Arizona Science and Technology Park (Tech Parks Arizona), Tucson, Arizona, United States, 2MW Solar Generating Power Plant
- Granite Construction on Swan Road, Tucson, Arizona, United States
- Parques Solares de Navarra, Villafranca, Spain
- Energías Del Tietar, Talayuela, Spain

== Management team ==
The management team included:

- Vahan Garboushian, CEO, chairman and founder
- Bob Williams, CFO
- Adam Plesniak, VP product development

== Awards ==
- Finalist for Solar Project of the Year from Power Engineering Magazine
- 2010 R&D 100 Award
- Frost & Sullivan Growth Capital Investment Opportunity of the Year
- Cleantech 100 2010
- DOE SunShot BOS-X

== See also ==
- Concentrated solar power
- Concentrated photovoltaics
- Solar power
