= Soitec =

French manufacturing company

- Type: Société Anonyme – SA (French publicly-traded limited company)
- Traded as: Euronext Paris: SOI; CAC Mid 60 component
- ISIN: FR0013227113
- Industry: Manufacture of electronic components
- Founded: 1992; 34 years ago
- Founder: André-Jacques Auberton-Hervé & Jean-Michel Lamure
- Headquarters: Bernin (Isère), France
- Key people: Laurent Rémont (CEO and chairman)
- Products: Semiconductor materials for mobile communications, automotive and smart objects
- Revenue: ▲€1.09 billion (2022–2023)
- Net income: ▲€233 million (2022–2023)
- Owner: Free-float (61.03%); BPI France (10.35%); NSIG Sunrise SARL (10.35%); Blackrock (8.91%); CEA Investment (7.31%); Employees (1.41%); Shin-Etsu Handotai Co., Ltd. (0.63%); Treasury Shares (0.01%)
- Number of employees: 2,044
- Website: soitec.com

Soitec is a French multinational corporation that manufactures substrates used in the manufacturing of semiconductors.

Soitec's semiconductor materials are used to manufacture chips which are used in smartphones, tablets, computers, IT servers, and data centres. Soitec's products are also found in electronic components used in cars, connected objects (Internet of Things), as well as industrial and medical equipment.

Soitec's flagship product is silicon on insulator (SOI). Materials produced by Soitec come in the form of substrates (also called "wafers"). These are produced as ultra-thin disks that are 200 to 300 mm in diameter and are less than 1 mm thick. These wafers are then etched and cut to be used for microchips in electronics.

== History ==
Soitec was founded in 1992 near Grenoble in France by two researchers from CEA Leti, an institute for micro- and nanotechnologies research created by the French Commission for Atomic Energy and Alternative Energies (CEA). The pair developed Smart Cut™ technology to industrialize Silicon-On-Insulator (SOI) wafers, and built their first production unit in Bernin, in the Isère department of France.

Soitec's offering initially targeted the electronics market. At the end of the 2000s, Soitec launched into the solar energy and lighting markets, exploiting new openings for its materials and technologies.

In 2010, the company filed 250 patents in France, as well as in the United States, China, and several Asian countries.

In 2015, the company announced that it would be refocusing its efforts on its core business: electronics.

Soitec employs about 2000 people throughout the world and currently has production units in France and in Singapore. The company also has R&D centers and commercial offices in France, the United States (Arizona and California), China, South Korea, Japan and Taiwan.

=== Key dates ===
- 1963: SOS is invented at North American Aviation.
- 1965: The first MEMS device is invented at Westinghouse.
- 1978: Hewlett-Packard develops SPER.
- 1979: NOSC starts researching thin-film SOS.
- 1988: NOSC publishes their SOS findings.
- 1989: IBM starts researching SOI.
- 1990: Peregrine Semiconductor is founded.
- 1991: Peregrine Semiconductor launches the commercialization of SOS (UltraCMOS).
- 1992: Creation of Soitec by researchers from CEA Leti in Grenoble, France.
- 1995: Peregrine Semiconductor delivers its first product.
- 1995: IBM commercializes SOI.
- 1997: CEA-Leti spins off Tronics Microsystems to commercialize SOI MEMS.
- 1997: Soitec shifts to mass production after the signature of a Smart Cut™ technology licensing agreement with Shin Etsu Handotai (SEH).
- 1999: Construction of Soitec's first production site in Bernin (Bernin 1), and launch of Soitec's initial public offering.
- 2001: IBM unveils RF-SOI technology
- 2001: CEA-Leti and Motorola start collaborating on the development of high aspect ratio SOI MEMS.
- 2002: OKI ships the first commercial FD-SOI LSI.
- 2002: Inauguration of Bernin 2, a Soitec manufacturing unit dedicated to 300-mm diameter wafers.
- 2003: Soitec acquires Picogiga International, a company specializing in technologies for III-V composite materials, and the first foray into materials other than SOI.
- 2005: Freescale introduces HARMEMS.
- 2006: Soitec acquires Tracit Technologies, a company specializing in molecular adhesion and mechanical and chemical thinning processes, enabling diversification into new applications for Smart Cut™ technology.
- 2008: Soitec opens a production unit in Asia, in Singapore. In 2012, this unit housed the SOI wafer recycling business. In 2013, production stopped at the unit to prepare for the company's new Fully Depleted Silicon on Insulator (FD-SOI) technology.
- 2009: Soitec acquires Concentrix Solar, a German supplier of concentrator photovoltaic (CPV) systems, Soitec thus entering the solar energy market.
- 2011: Soitec acquires Altatech Semiconductor, a company specialized in developing equipment for producing semiconductors.
- 2012: Soitec opens a production unit for CPV modules in San Diego, California, with a capacity of 140 MW, upgradeable to 280 MW.
- 2012: GlobalFoundries and STMicroelectronics sign a sourcing agreement for 28 nm and 20 nm FD-SOI devices. GlobalFoundries agreed to manufacture wafers for STMicroelectronics using the latter's CMOS28FDSOI. The FD-SOI technology originates from the cooperation between Soitec, ST and CEA Leti.
- 2013: Soitec signs a Smart Cut™ licensing agreement with Sumitomo Electric to develop the gallium nitride (GaN) wafer market for LED lighting applications. Signature of another agreement, with GT Advanced Technologies, to develop and commercialize equipment for producing wafers for manufacturing LEDs and other industrial applications.
- 2014: Samsung and STMicroelectronics sign a foundry and license agreement. It enables Samsung to use the FD-SOI technology to produce 28 nm integrated circuits. Soitec solar energy division also inaugurates the first 50% of South African Touwsrivier solar plant, which will have a final total capacity of 44 MWp. The plant was never completed.
- 2015: Samsung qualifies their 28FDS process.
- 2015: After the stoppage of some important solar projects in the United States, Soitec announces a strategic shift toward its electronics business and a plan to leave the solar energy business.
- 2015: Peregrine Semiconductor and GlobalFoundries announce in July the first 300mm RF-SOI platform (130 nm).
- 2015: GlobalFoundries announces in July the implementation of a technological platform for producing 22-nm FD-SOI chips (22FDX).
- 2015: Soitec and Simgui announce the first Chinese production of 200mm SOI wafers.
- 2015: CEA Leti demos MEMS on 300mm SOI wafers.
- 2016: Soitec starts volume manufacturing of 300mm RF-SOI wafers.
- 2017: GlobalFoundries announces 45RFSOI.
- 2017: Samsung announces 18FDS.
- 2017: IBM and GlobalFoundries announce a custom FinFET-on-SOI process (14HP).
- 2017: Soitec signs a five-year agreement to supply GlobalFoundries with FD-SOI wafers.
- 2018: STMicroelectronics adopts GlobalFoundries' 22FDX.
- 2018: Soitec and MBDA acquire the Dolphin Integration assets.
- 2019: Soitec signs a high-volume agreement to supply Samsung with FD-SOI wafers.
- 2019: Soitec acquires EpiGaN
- 2019: Soitec signs high-volume agreements to supply GlobalFoundries with SOI wafers.
- 2020: GlobalFoundries announces the 22FDX+ platform.
- 2020: Soitec signs a multi-year agreement to supply GlobalFoundries with 300mm RF-SOI wafers.
- 2022: start of building of the Bernin 4 facility for SiC wafers, intended to start production in 2024.

== Operations ==
Historically, Soitec has marketed Silicon on Insulator (SOI) as a high performance material for manufacturing electronic chips for computers, game consoles and servers, as well as the automotive industry. With the explosion of mobile products (tablets, smartphones, etc.) on the consumer electronics market, Soitec has also developed new materials for radio-frequency components, multimedia processors, and power electronics.

With the rapid growth of the Internet of Things, wearables, and other mobile devices, new needs have arisen in terms of performance and energy efficiency of electronic components. For this market, Soitec offers materials that help reduce the energy consumed by chips, improve their information processing speed, and support the needs of high-speed Internet.

In the solar energy market Soitec acquired Concentrix Solar, then manufactured and supplied Concentrator Photovoltaic (CPV) systems from 2009 to 2015. Research to create a new generation of four-junction solar cells led Soitec to set a world record in December 2014 with a cell capable of converting 46% of solar rays into electricity. Soitec announced in January 2015 that it would be leaving the solar market after several important solar plant projects ended.

In the lighting industry, Soitec operates upstream and downstream of the LED value chain.

== Technologies ==
Soitec is developing numerous technologies for its different sectors of activity.

=== Smart Cut™ ===
Developed by CEA-Leti in collaboration with Soitec, this technology has been patented by researcher Michel Bruel. It makes possible the transfer of a thin layer of monocristalline material from a donor substrate to another by combining ion implantation and bonding by molecular adhesion. Soitec uses Smart Cut™ technology to mass-produce SOI wafers. Compared with classic bulk silicon, SOI enables a significant reduction in energy leakage in the substrate, and improves the performance of the circuit in which it is used.

=== Smart Stacking™ ===
The technology involves the transfer of partially or fully processed wafers onto other wafers. It can be adapted to wafer diameters of 150 mm to 300 mm and is compatible with a wide variety of substrates, such as silicon, glass and sapphire.

Smart Stacking™ technology is used for back-side illuminated image sensors, where it improves sensitivity and enables a smaller pixel size, as well as in smartphone radio-frequency circuits. It also opens new doors to 3D integration.

=== Epitaxy ===
Soitec has epitaxy expertise in III-IV materials across the following fields: molecular beam epitaxy, metal organic vapor phase epitaxy and hydride vapor phase epitaxy. The company manufactures wafers of gallium arsenide (GaAs) and gallium nitride (GaN) for developing and manufacturing compound semiconductor systems.

These materials are used in Wi-Fi and high-frequency electronic devices (mobile telecommunications, infrastructure networks, satellite communications, fiber optic networks and radar detection), as well as in energy management and optoelectronic systems, such as LEDs.

== Capital increases ==
Soitec has carried out three capital increases:

- The first in July 2011 to finance investments, especially for developing its solar energy and LED businesses.
- The second in July 2013 to contribute to the refinancing of bonds convertible and/or exchangeable into new or existing shares (“OCEANEs”) due in 2014 and strengthen the company's financial structure. In addition, Soitec opened a further bond issue in September 2013.
- The third in June 2014 to strengthen Soitec's financial profile and its cash position and support the FD-SOI substrates industrial mass production.
