= Newberry Springs CPV Power Plant =

Solar power station in California, US

- Country: United States
- Location: Newberry Springs, California
- Coordinates: 34°51′13″N 116°40′59″W
- Status: Operational
- Construction began: 2012
- Commission date: 2013
- Owner: Saint-Augustin Canada Electric

Solar farm
- Type: CPV
- Site area: 14 acres (6 ha)

Power generation
- Units operational: 60 Soitec CX-S530
- Nameplate capacity: 1.68 MW_{p}, 1.50 MW_{AC}
- Capacity factor: 22.3% (average 2014-2020)
- Annual net output: 2.93 GW·h, 209 MW·h/acre

The Newberry Springs CPV Power Plant is a 1.68 MW_{p} (1.5 MW_{AC}) concentrator photovoltaics (CPV) power station in Newberry Springs, California. It was built by Blattner Energy using 60 dual-axis CX-S530 systems, each of which contains 12 CX-M500 modules. Each module contains 2,400 Fresnel lenses to concentrate sunlight 500 times onto multi-junction solar cells, allowing a greater efficiency than other photovoltaic power plants. The output is being sold to Southern California Edison under a 20-year Power Purchase Agreement.

== Electricity production ==
Generation (MW·h) of Newberry Solar 1
| Year | Jan | Feb | Mar | Apr | May | Jun | Jul | Aug | Sep | Oct | Nov | Dec | Total |
|---|---|---|---|---|---|---|---|---|---|---|---|---|---|
| 2013 | | | | | | | | | | | | 157 | 157 |
| 2014 | 126 | 144 | 253 | 300 | 344 | 382 | 353 | 382 | 373 | 337 | 280 | 191 | 3,464 |
| 2015 | 125 | 158 | 232 | 260 | 261 | 269 | 279 | 282 | 233 | 196 | 182 | 149 | 2,625 |
| 2016 | 98 | 164 | 181 | 211 | 263 | 252 | 294 | 290 | 256 | 216 | 185 | 135 | 2,546 |
| 2017 | 118 | 131 | 246 | 262 | 334 | 362 | 330 | 305 | 284 | 262 | 162 | 170 | 2,966 |
| 2018 | 138 | 194 | 222 | 278 | 335 | 361 | 312 | 314 | 297 | 234 | 161 | 128 | 2,974 |
| 2019 | 137 | 159 | 242 | 281 | 293 | 354 | 350 | 342 | 280 | 257 | 165 | 106 | 2,966 |
| 2020 | 153 | 208 | 203 | 256 | 336 | 334 | 377 | 313 | 246 | 227 | 179 | 142 | 2,975 |
| Average Annual Production for years 2014-2020: | | | | | | | | | | | | | 2,931 |

== See also ==
- Alamosa Solar Generating Project
- List of photovoltaic power stations
- Renewable energy in the United States
- Renewable portfolio standard
- Solar power in the United States
