= Skyline Solar =

US company

- Type: Private
- Industry: Solar Energy
- Founded: 2007
- Headquarters: 185 E. Dana Street, Mountain View, California, 94041 United States
- Area served: Worldwide
- Key people: Tom Rohrs (CEO and executive chairman); Bob MacDonald (co-founder and chief technical officer)
- Products: Skyline Solar X14 CPV System
- Website: Skyline Solar

Skyline Solar was a concentrated photovoltaic (CPV) company based in Mountain View, California, United States. The company developed medium-concentration photovoltaic systems to produce electricity for commercial, industrial and utility scale solar markets. The company was founded in 2007 by Bob MacDonald, Bill Keating and Eric Johnson. The operation of the company appears to have ceased in late 2012, and the website has been deactivated.

== Engineering challenges posed by concentration ==
The output of a photovoltaic system can be increased with improvements in cell efficiency, the use of trackers, concentration, and other more subtle engineering improvements. Tracking provides up to thirty percent more energy per peak watt compared to fixed tilt (non-tracking) systems. Controlling the temperature of the cells in a CPV system is critical to high energy generation because higher cell temperatures reduce the output of the panel. Skyline Solar uses a combination of tracking, cooling fins, and reflectors to focus light on a single strip of silicon cells and maximize energy production.

== Technical details ==
Skyline Solar's X14 array

Skyline Solar's X14 system combines crystalline silicon arrays with reflectors, single axis trackers, and cooling fins to create a system in which sunlight is concentrated 14 times, hence the name "X14." Integrated trackers adjust the position of the reflectors so that light remains concentrated on the solar cells while the sun travels across the sky. Long rows of arrays are oriented north–south, and the tracker rotates east to west to optimize the light capture.

== Design ==
The Skyline Solar X14 system consists of three principal components: panels, reflectors and an integrated single-axis tracker. The photograph shows one Skyline X14 array, which is rated at 3780 DC Watts STC using the 1000 Watts per square meter DNI standard or 3520 DC watts using the 850 W/m^{2} standard used in Italy. A typical installation would include as few as 28 or as many as 20,000 arrays installed in many long rows.

Silicon cells represent the great majority of the cost of any large conventional PV system. Skyline's design replaces most of the silicon with mirrors. Reflectors concentrate sunlight by a factor of 14, and this allows Skyline to use 1/14 as much silicon as flat panel tracking systems and 1/20 as much as non-tracking flat panel. To keep the panels operating efficiently, Skyline bonds large aluminium cooling fins to the back of each panel. If unfolded, each fin would cover an area more than 40 times larger than the face of the solar panel itself. Natural convection, aided by the wind, keeps the panels operating at temperatures comparable to conventional PV modules.

Skyline's X14 reflectors are near-parabolic in cross-section and their patented shape allows them to focus light uniformly on the solar panels. Uniform flux enhances system efficiency. In addition, the Skyline X14 Reflector design enables a tight optical coupling between adjacent arrays. This maximizes energy production regardless of the angle at which sunlight strikes the mirrors.

The higher the concentrating power of a CPV system, the more precisely it must be aimed. For example, looking at the Moon through powerful binoculars usually results in an unsteady image. As it is a medium concentration system, the Skyline X14 system has a wide acceptance angle. This is the angle (as seen from the PV system's lens or mirror) between the Sun's actual location and the spot in the sky that the concentrator is actually pointing at. Skyline's acceptance angle is 1.3° of azimuth and ± 60° of elevation.

== Target PV markets ==
CPV technology has been adopted primarily from large commercial and utility-scale customers in highly sunny locations, such as the US southwest, western India, Italy and Chile. As is true for most CPV technologies, Skyline's products are not suited for residential or commercial rooftop installations.

Skyline Solar, Inc. was a 2008 winner of a Department of Energy Solar Energy Technology Program grant. The company installed its first system at the San Jose-based Santa Clara Valley Transportation Authority (VTA) on May 15, 2009.
