= Touwsrivier CPV Solar Project =

- Country: South Africa
- Location: Touwsrivier (Cape Winelands District Municipality), Western Cape
- Coordinates: 33°24′38″S 19°55′35″E
- Status: Operational
- Commission date: December 2014
- Construction cost: R1 billion (~US$100 million)
- Owners: Soitec (20%); South African Govt (40%); Pele Energy Group (35%); Local Community (5%)
- Operator: juwi SOLAR ZA

Solar farm
- Type: CPV
- Site area: 470 acres (190 ha)

Power generation
- Units operational: 1500 Soitec CX-S530-II
- Nameplate capacity: 44 MW_{p}, 36 MW_{AC}
- Capacity factor: 22.8% (average 2015-2019)
- Annual net output: 72.0 GW·h, 153 MW·h/acre

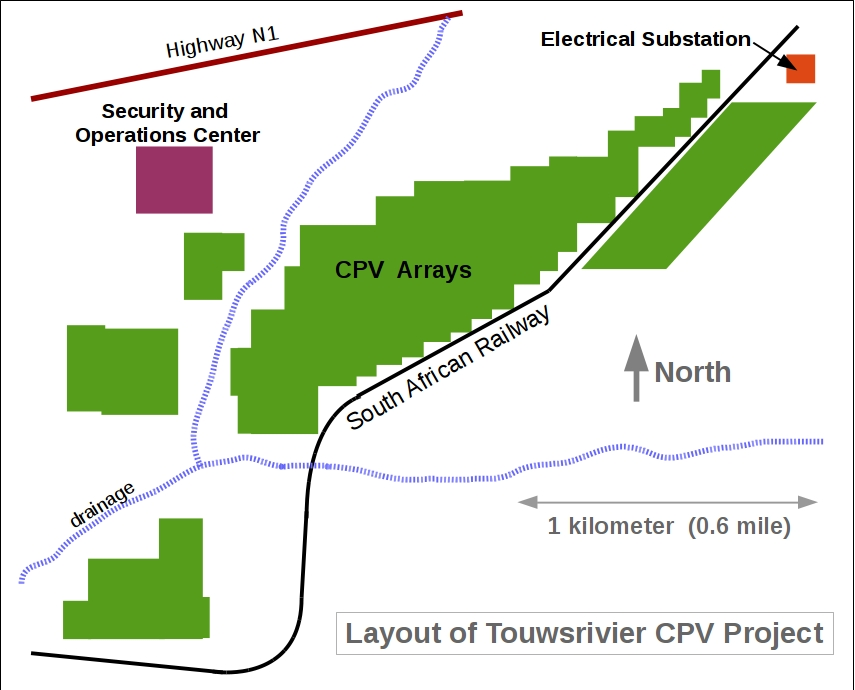
Overall layout of the project

Touwsrivier CPV Solar Project is a 44 MW_{p} (36 MW_{AC}) concentrator photovoltaics (CPV) power station located 13 km outside the town of Touwsrivier in the Western Cape of South Africa. The installation reached full capacity in December 2014 and is the second largest operating CPV facility in the world. Electricity produced by the plant is fed into the national grid operated by Eskom under a 20-year power purchase agreement (PPA).

== Facility construction details ==
The facility consists of 1500 dual-axis CX-S530-II solar tracking systems divided into 60 sections. The 25 systems of each section are connected in parallel to a central grid-connected 630 kW inverter. Each system supports 12 CX-M500 modules which are each rated to produce 2450 W_{p}. Each module contains 2,400 fresnel lenses to concentrate sunlight 500 times onto multi-junction solar cells, allowing a greater efficiency than other photovoltaic power plants.

The facility is sited on 190 hectares near a similar 60 kW CPV pilot plant on the neighbouring Aquila private game reserve. Group Five Construction (Pty) Ltd served as the EPC contractor for the balance of the project. It is the world's largest assembly of Soitec's Concentrix Solar technology.

== Ownership, funding, and operations ==
Soitec initiated the project under the South African government's Renewable Energy Independent Power Producer Procurement Programme (REIPPPP). Construction was financed with a US$100 million (R1 billion) bond special purpose vehicle (SPV) on the Johannesburg Stock Exchange. The project is owned by Soitec (20%); the Public Investment Corporation, which is the South African Government's employee pension fund (40% through a preferred share structure ); Pele Green Energy (Pty) Ltd (35%); and the Touwsrivier Community Trust (5%). Pele Energy also provides oversight of ongoing operation and improvement activities with a subsidiary of juwi Renewable Energies.

== Local community ==
Like other similar solar projects in South Africa, a profit sharing and investment agreement exists with the local community whereby a share of the profits from the plant are invested in improving the town of Touws River. This includes the construction of a hydroponics farm employing 30 people and upgrades to the town's primary school. Ongoing maintenance and security operations at the plant also employ about 35 people.

== Electricity production ==
Monthly capacity and production data for grid-connected photovoltaic plants in South Africa are available in aggregate from the Renewable Energy Data and Information Service. Data from individual plants is restricted due to Department of Energy confidentiality protocols. Annual electricity production for the Touwsrivier CPV plant has performed near expected targets for the first five years of operation (2015–2019) as summarized in this bond credit rating opinion from Moody's.

Total Annual Generation of CPV1
Year	Total Annual MW·h
2015	69,204
2016	74,364
2017	75,506
2018	70,533
2019	70,394
Average (2015–2019)	72,000

Note that the plant's 44 MW_{p} peak DC rating is specified under concentrator standard test conditions (CSTC) of DNI=1000 W/m^{2}, AM1.5D, & T_{cell}=25 °C, as per the IEC 62670 standard convention. Production capacity is 36MW based on IEC 62670 concentrator standard operating conditions (CSOC) of DNI=900 W/m^{2}, AM1.5D, T_{ambient}=20 °C, & Wind speed=2 m/s, and is also the value quoted by several sources as representing the plant's expected AC capacity (denoted as MW_{AC}). A capacity factor of 0.230 (23.0%) then corresponds to annual production of:

$$(36\ \mbox{MW}) \times (0.230\ ) \times (365\ \mbox{days}) \times (24\ \mbox{hours/day}) = 72,500\ \mbox{MW·h}$$

== See also ==
- List of power stations in South Africa
- Solar power in South Africa
- Environmental impact of solar power
- Sustainable energy
