= Concentrator photovoltaics =

Use of mirror or lens assemblies to generate current from multi-junction solar cells

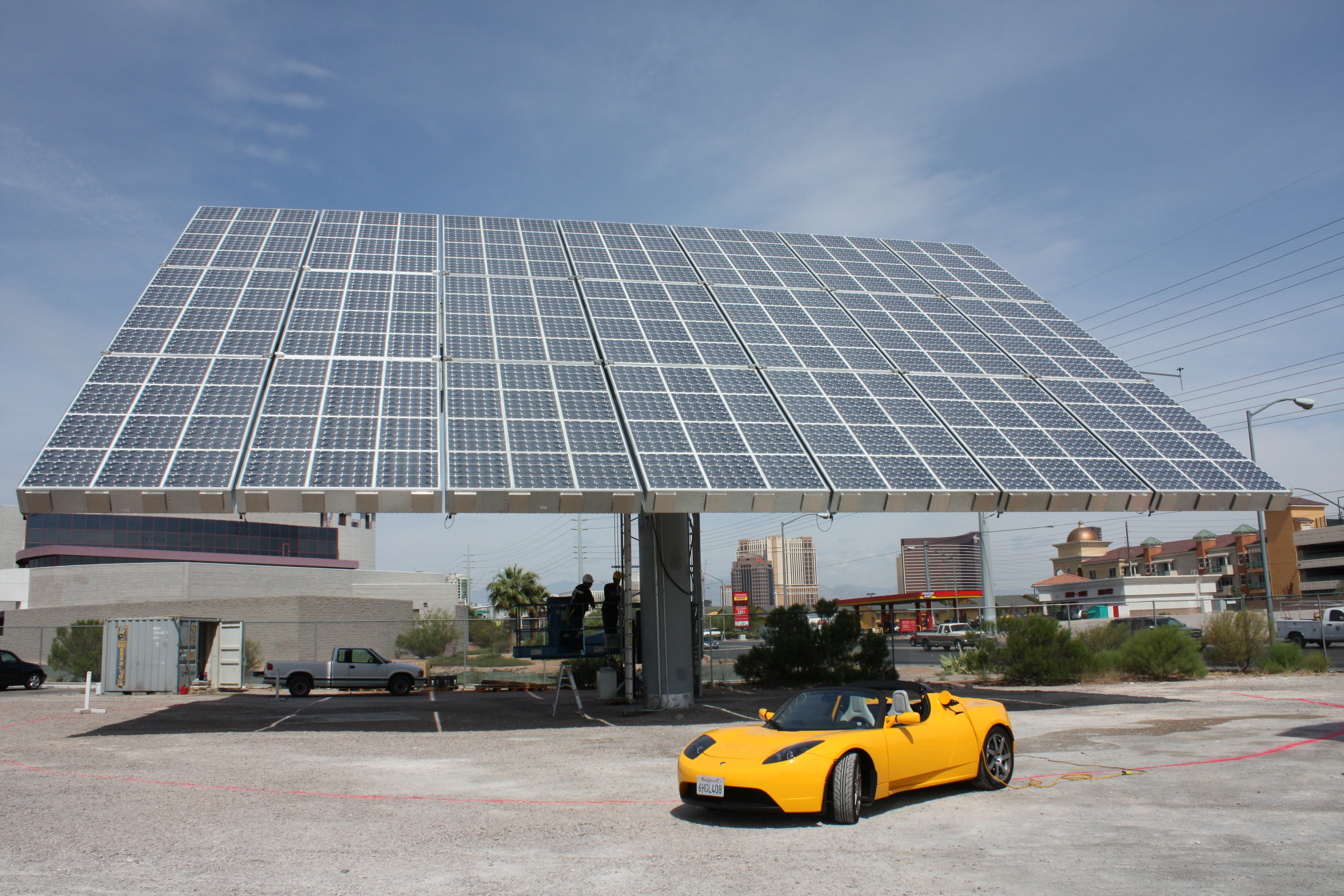
This Amonix system in Las Vegas, US, consists of thousands of small Fresnel lenses, each focusing sunlight to ≈500x higher intensity onto a tiny, high-efficiency multi-junction solar cell. A Tesla Roadster is parked beneath for scale.

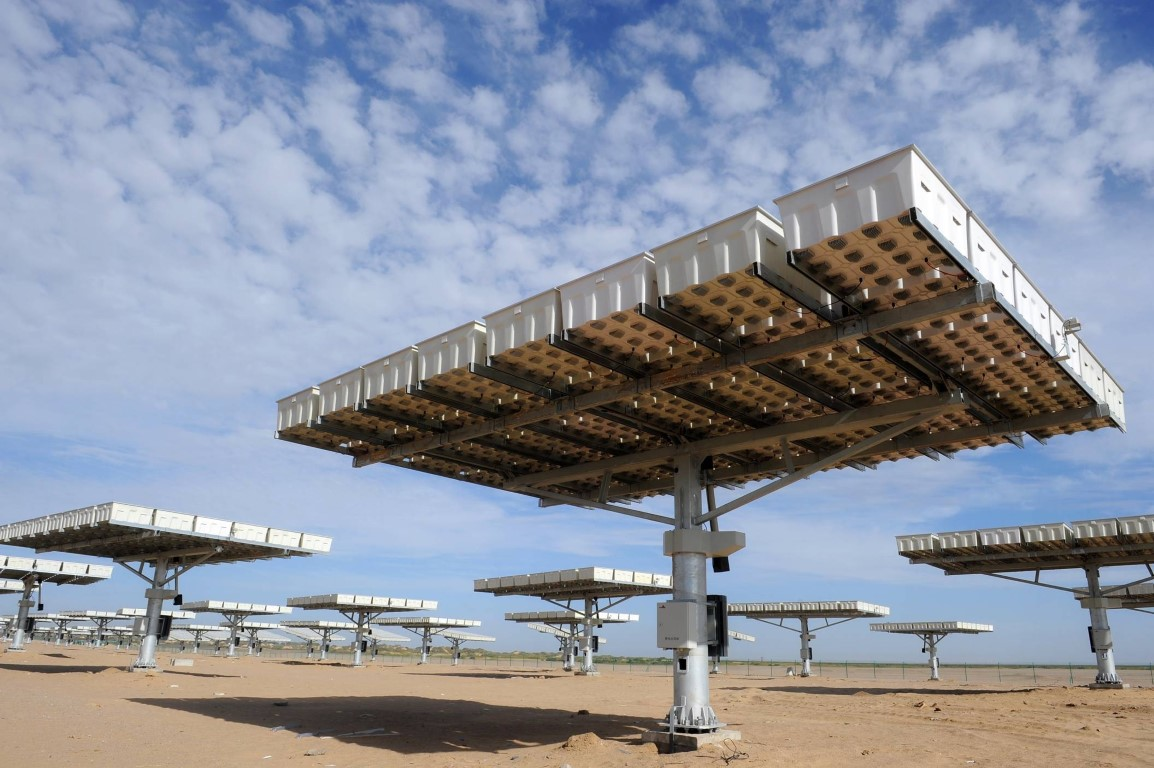
Concentrator photovoltaics (CPV) modules on dual axis solar trackers in Golmud, China

Concentrator photovoltaics (CPV), also called concentra[ting/tion] photovoltaics, is a photovoltaic technology that generates electricity from sunlight. Unlike conventional photovoltaic systems, it uses lenses or curved mirrors to focus sunlight onto small, highly efficient, multi-junction (MJ) solar cells. In addition, CPV systems often use solar trackers and sometimes a cooling system to further increase their efficiency.

Systems using high-concentration photovoltaics (HCPV) possess the highest efficiency of all existing PV technologies, achieving near 40% for production modules and 30% for systems. They enable a smaller photovoltaic array that has the potential to reduce land use, waste heat and material, and balance of system costs. The rate of annual CPV installations peaked in 2012 and has fallen to near zero since 2018 with the faster price drop in crystalline silicon photovoltaics. In 2016, cumulative CPV installations reached 350 megawatts (MW), less than 0.2% of the global installed capacity of 230,000 MW that year.

HCPV directly competes with concentrated solar power (CSP) as both technologies are suited best for areas with high direct normal irradiance, which are also known as the Sun Belt region in the United States and the Golden Banana in Southern Europe. CPV and CSP are often confused with one another, despite being intrinsically different technologies from the start: CPV uses the photovoltaic effect to directly generate electricity from sunlight, while CSP – often called concentrated solar thermal – uses the heat from the sun's radiation in order to make steam to drive a turbine, that then produces electricity using a generator. As of 2012, CSP was more common than CPV.

== History ==
Research into concentrator photovoltaics has taken place since the mid 1970s, initially spurred on by the energy shock from a mideast oil embargo. Sandia National Laboratories in Albuquerque, New Mexico was the site for most of the early work, with the first modern-like photovoltaic concentrating system produced there late in the decade. Their first system was a linear-trough concentrator system that used a point focus acrylic Fresnel lens focusing on water-cooled silicon cells and two-axis tracking. Cell cooling with a passive heat sink and use of silicone-on-glass Fresnel lenses was demonstrated in 1979 by the Ramón Areces Project at the Institute of Solar Energy of the Technical University of Madrid. The 350 kW SOLERAS project in Saudi Arabia – the largest until many years later – was constructed by Sandia/Martin Marietta in 1981.

Research and development continued through the 1980s and 1990s without significant industry interest. Improvements in cell efficiency were soon recognized as essential to making the technology economical. However the improvements to Si-based cell technologies used by both concentrators and flat PV failed to favor the system-level economics of CPV. The introduction of III-V Multi-junction solar cells starting in the early 2000s has since provided a clear differentiator. MJ cell efficiencies have improved from 34% (3-junctions) to 47.6% (4-junctions) at research-scale production levels. A substantial number of multi-MW CPV projects have also been commissioned worldwide since 2010.

In 2016, cumulative CPV installations reached 350 megawatts (MW), less than 0.2% of the global installed capacity of 230,000 MW. Commercial HCPV systems reached instantaneous ("spot") efficiencies of up to 42% under standard test conditions (with concentration levels above 400) and the International Energy Agency sees potential to increase the efficiency of this technology to 50% by the mid-2020s. As of April 2026, the best lab cell efficiency for concentrator MJ-cells reached 47.6% (four or more junctions). Under outdoor, operating conditions, CPV module efficiencies have exceeded 33% ("one third of a sun"). System-level AC efficiencies are in the range of 25–28%. CPV installations are located in China, the United States, South Africa, Italy and Spain.

== Challenges ==
Modern CPV systems operate most efficiently in highly concentrated sunlight (i.e. concentration levels equivalent to hundreds of suns), as long as the solar cell is kept cool through the use of heat sinks. Diffuse light, which occurs in cloudy and overcast conditions, cannot be highly concentrated using conventional optical components only (i.e. macroscopic lenses and mirrors). Filtered light, which occurs in hazy or polluted conditions, has spectral variations which produce mismatches between the electrical currents generated within the series-connected junctions of spectrally "tuned" multi-junction (MJ) photovoltaic cells. These CPV features lead to rapid decreases in power output when atmospheric conditions are less than ideal.

To produce equal or greater energy per rated watt than conventional PV systems, CPV systems must be located in areas that receive plentiful direct sunlight. This is typically specified as average DNI (Direct Normal Irradiance) greater than 5.5-6m kWh/m^{2}/day or 2000 kWh/m^{2}/yr. Otherwise, evaluations of annualized DNI vs. GNI/GHI (Global Normal Irradiance and Global Horizontal Irradiance) irradiance data have concluded that conventional PV should still perform better over time than presently available CPV technology in most regions of the world (see for example).

CPV Strengths	CPV Weaknesses
High efficiencies under direct normal irradiance	HCPV cannot utilize diffuse radiation. LCPV can only utilize a fraction of diffuse radiation.
Low cost per watt of manufacturing capital	Power output of MJ solar cells is more sensitive to shifts in radiation spectra caused by changing atmospheric conditions.
Low temperature coefficients	Tracking with sufficient accuracy and reliability is required.
No cooling water required for passively cooled systems	May require frequent cleaning to mitigate soiling losses, depending on the site
Additional use of waste heat possible for systems with active cooling possible (e.g.large mirror systems)	Limited market – can only be used in regions with high DNI, cannot be easily installed on rooftops
Modular – kW to GW scale	Strong cost decrease of competing technologies for electricity production
Increased and stable energy production throughout the day due to (two-axis) tracking	Bankability and perception issues
Low energy payback time	New generation technologies, without a history of production (thus increased risk)
Potential double use of land e.g. for agriculture, low environmental impact	Optical losses
High potential for cost reduction	Lack of technology standardization
Opportunities for local manufacturing	–
Smaller cell sizes could prevent large fluctuations in module price due to variations in semiconductor prices	–
Greater potential for efficiency increase in the future compared to single-junction flat plate systems could lead to greater improvements in land area use, BOS costs, and BOP costs	–
Source: Current Status of CPV report, January 2015. Table 2: Analysis of the strengths and weaknesses of CPV.

== Ongoing research and development ==
International CPV-x Conference - Historical Participation Statistics. Data Source - CPV-x Proceedings

CPV research and development has been pursued in over 20 countries for more than a decade. The annual CPV-x conference series has served as a primary networking and exchange forum between university, government lab, and industry participants. Government agencies have also continued to encourage a number of specific technology thrusts.

ARPA-E announced a first round of R&D funding in late 2015 for the MOSAIC Program (Microscale Optimized Solar-cell Arrays with Integrated Concentration) to further combat the location and expense challenges of existing CPV technology. As stated in the program description: "MOSAIC projects are grouped into three categories: complete systems that cost effectively integrate micro-CPV for regions such as sunny areas of the U.S. southwest that have high Direct Normal Irradiance (DNI) solar radiation; complete systems that apply to regions, such as areas of the U.S. Northeast and Midwest, that have low DNI solar radiation or high diffuse solar radiation; and concepts that seek partial solutions to technology challenges."

In Europe the CPVMATCH Program (Concentrating PhotoVoltaic Modules using Advanced Technologies and Cells for Highest efficiencies) aims "to bring practical performance of HCPV modules closer to theoretical limits". Efficiency goals achievable by 2019 are identified as 48% for cells and 40% for modules at >800x concentration. A 41.4% module efficiency was announced at the end of 2018.

The Australian Renewable Energy Agency (ARENA) extended its support in 2017 for further commercialization of the HCPV technology developed by Raygen. Their 250 kW dense array receivers are the most powerful CPV receivers thus far created, with demonstrated PV efficiency of 40.4% and include usable heat co-generation.

A low concentrating solar device that includes its own internal tracker, is in development by ISP Solar which will enhance the efficiency of solar cell at low cost.

Due to several challenges CPV face, a novel ray tracing method is applied to better characterize the overall performance of CPV systems. This method is based on the propagation of inhomogeneous waves in absorbing media, enabling the materials' characterization, using their complex refractive indices.

== Efficiency ==
Reported records of solar cell efficiency since 1975. As of April 2026, best lab cell efficiency reached 47.6% (for ⊡ multi-junction concentrator, 4+ junctions).

According to theory, semiconductor properties allow solar cells to operate more efficiently in concentrated light than they do under a nominal level of solar irradiance. This is because, along with a proportional increase in the generated current, there also occurs a logarithmic enhancement in operating voltage, in response to the higher illumination.

To be explicit, consider the power (P) generated by a solar cell under "one-sun" illumination at the earth's surface, which corresponds to a peak solar irradiance Q=1000 Watts/m^{2}. The cell power can be expressed as a function of the open-circuit voltage (V_{oc}), the short-circuit current (I_{sc}), and the fill factor (FF) of the cell's characteristic current–voltage (I-V) curve:

$$P = I_\mathrm{sc} \times V_\mathrm{oc} \times FF.$$

Upon increased illumination of the cell at "χ-suns", corresponding to concentration (χ) and irradiance (χQ), there can be similarly expressed:

$$P_\chi = I_\mathrm{\chi sc} \times V_\mathrm{\chi oc} \times FF_\chi$$

where, as shown by reference:

$$I_\mathrm{\chi sc} = \chi \times I_\mathrm{sc} \quad$$

and

$$\quad V_\mathrm{\chi oc} = V_\mathrm{oc} + { k T \over q } \ln(\chi).$$

Note that the unitless fill factor for a "high quality" solar cell typically ranges 0.75–0.9 and can, in practice, depend primarily on the equivalent shunt and series resistances for the particular cell construction. For concentrator applications, FF and FF_{χ} should then have similar values that are both near unity, corresponding to high shunt resistance and very low series resistance (<1 milliohm).

The efficiencies of a cell of area (A) under one-sun and χ-suns are defined as:

$\eta = {P \over QA} \quad$ and $\quad \eta_\chi = {P_\chi \over \chi QA}.$

The efficiency under concentration is then given in terms of χ and the cell characteristics as:

$$\eta_\chi = \eta \times {P_\chi \over \chi P} = \eta \times \left( {1 + { k T \over q }} {\ln(\chi) \over V_\mathrm{oc}} \right) \times \left( {FF_\chi \over FF} \right),$$

where the term kT/q is the voltage (called the thermal voltage) of a thermalized population of electrons – such as that flowing through a solar cell's p-n junction – and has a value of about 25.85 mV at room temperature (300 K).

The efficiency enhancement of η_{χ} relative to η is listed in the following table for a set of typical open-circuit voltages that roughly represent different cell technologies. The table shows that the enhancement can be as much as 20–30% at χ = 1000 concentration. The calculation assumes FF_{χ}/FF=1; an assumption which is clarified in the following discussion.

Theoretical Cell Efficiency Increase Due to Sunlight Concentration
Cell Technology	Multi-crystal Silicon	Mono-crystal Silicon	Triple-junction III-V on GaAs
Approximate Junction V_{oc}	550 mV	700 mV	850 mV
χ = 10	10.8%	8.5%	7.0%
χ = 100	21.6%	17.0%	14.0%
χ = 1000	32.5%	25.5%	21.0%

In practice, the higher current densities and temperatures which arise under sunlight concentration may be challenging to prevent from degrading the cell's I-V properties or, worse, causing permanent physical damage. Such effects can reduce the ratio FF_{χ}/FF by an even larger percentage below unity than the tabulated values shown above. To prevent irreversible damage, the rise in cell operating temperature under concentration must be controlled with the use of a suitable heat sink. Additionally, the cell design itself must incorporate features that reduce recombination and the contact, electrode, and busbar resistances to levels that accommodate the target concentration and resulting current density. These features include thin, low-defect semiconductor layers; thick, low-resistivity electrode and busbar materials; and small (typically <1 cm^{2}) cell sizes.

Including such features, the best thin film multi-junction photovoltaic cells developed for terrestrial CPV applications achieve reliable operation at concentrations as high as 500–1000 suns (i.e. irradiances of 50–100 Watts/cm^{2}). In May 2022, researchers at Fraunhofer Institute for Solar Energy Systems ISE in Freiburg, Germany, demonstrated a four-junction concentrator solar cell with an efficiency of 47.6% under 665-fold sunlight concentration. The theoretical limiting efficiency under concentration approaches 65% for 5 junctions, which is a likely practical maximum.

== Optical design ==
All CPV systems have a solar cell and a concentrating optic. Optical sunlight concentrators for CPV introduce a very specific design problem, with features that make them different from most other optical designs. They have to be efficient, suitable for mass production, capable of high concentration, insensitive to manufacturing and mounting inaccuracies, and capable of providing uniform illumination of the cell. All these reasons make nonimaging optics the most suitable for CPV. Non-imaging optics is often used for various lighting applications. In order to achieve high efficiency, glass with high transmission is required and proper manufacturing process needs to be used to ensure shape precision.

For very low concentrations, the wide acceptance angles of nonimaging optics avoid the need for active solar tracking. For medium and high concentrations, a wide acceptance angle can be seen as a measure of how tolerant the optic is to imperfections in the whole system. It is vital to start with a wide acceptance angle since it must be able to accommodate tracking errors, movements of the system due to wind, imperfectly manufactured optics, imperfectly assembled components, finite stiffness of the supporting structure or its deformation due to aging, among other factors. All of these reduce the initial acceptance angle and, after they are all factored in, the system must still be able to capture the finite angular aperture of sunlight.

== Types ==
CPV systems are categorized according to the amount of their solar concentration, measured in "suns" (the square of the magnification).

=== Low concentration PV (LCPV) ===
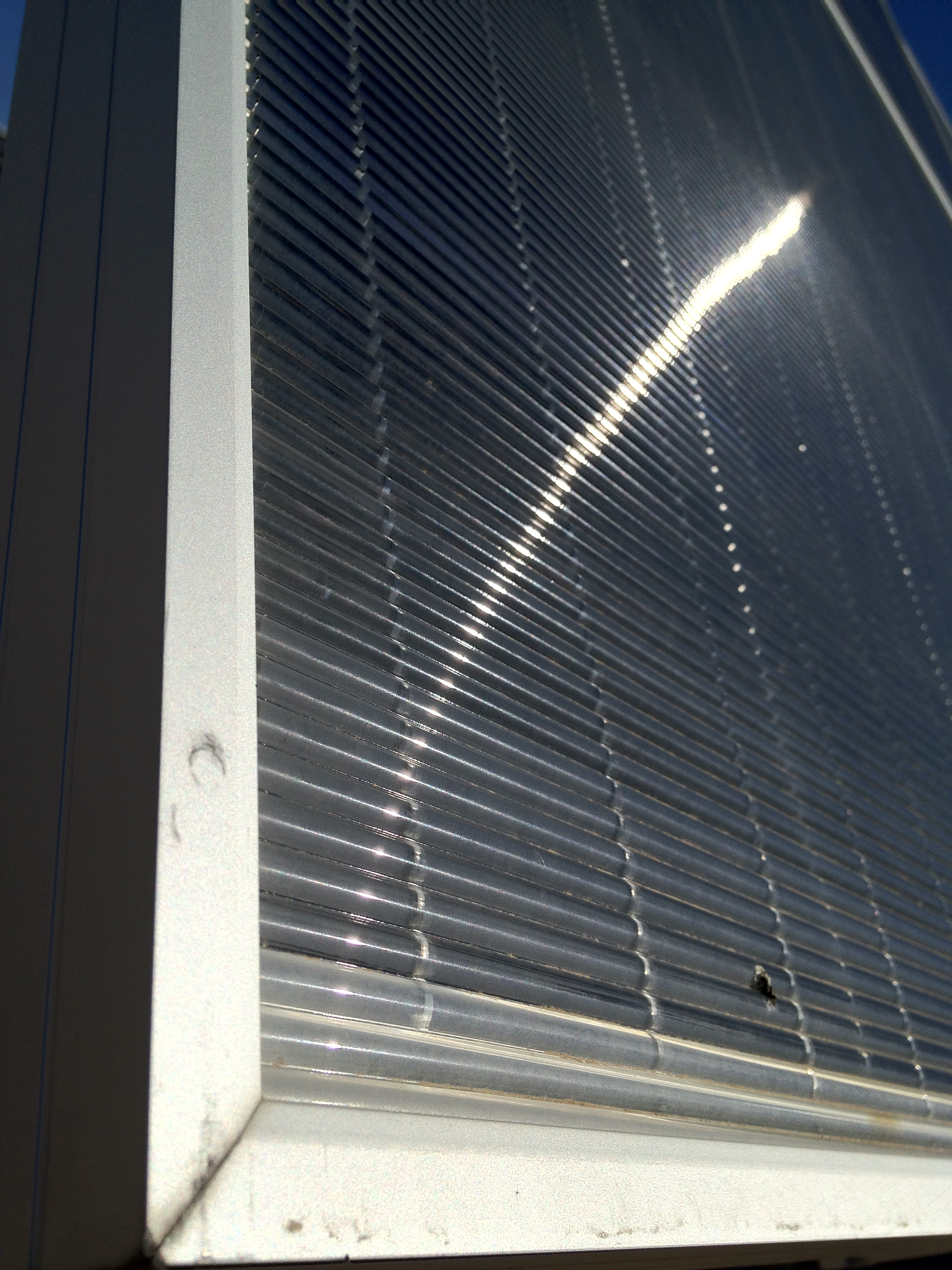
An example of a Low Concentration PV Cell's surface, showing the glass lensing

Low concentration PV are systems with a solar concentration of 2–100 suns. For economic reasons, conventional or modified silicon solar cells are typically used. The heat flux is typically low enough that the cells do not need to be actively cooled. For standard solar modules, there is also modeling and experimental evidence that no tracking or cooling modifications are needed if the concentration level is low

Low-concentration systems often have a simple booster reflector, which can increase solar electric output by over 30% from that of non-concentrator PV systems. Experimental results from such LCPV systems in Canada resulted in energy gains over 40% for prismatic glass and 45% for traditional crystalline silicon PV modules.

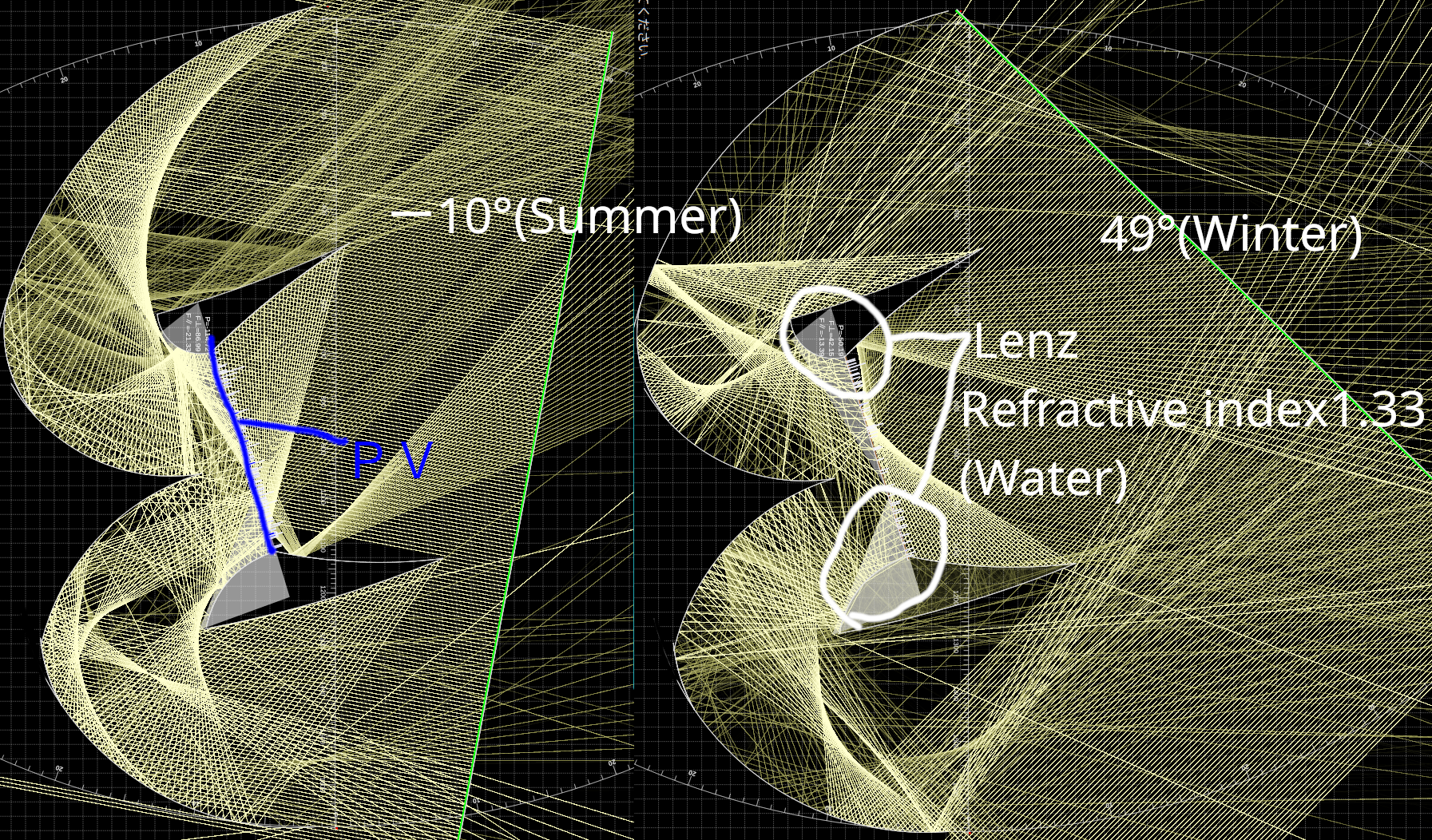
Even with a zero axis, precise design makes it possible to focus light and extend PV life up to four times.(Snow uses)

=== Medium concentration PV ===
From concentrations of 100 to 300 suns, the CPV systems require two-axis solar tracking and cooling (whether passive or active), which makes them more complex.

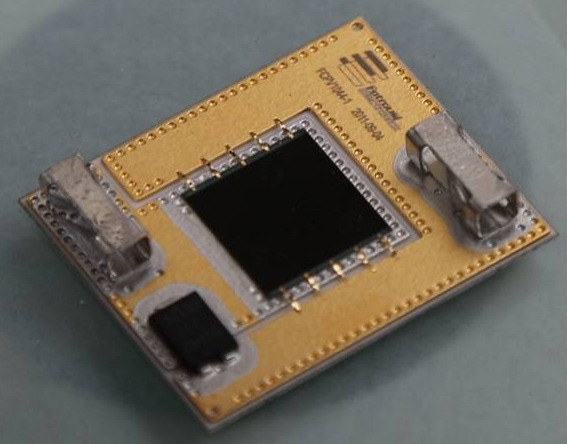
A 10×10 mm HCPV solar cell

=== High concentration PV (HCPV) ===
High concentration photovoltaics (HCPV) systems employ concentrating optics consisting of dish reflectors or Fresnel lenses that concentrate sunlight to intensities of 1,000 suns or more. The solar cells require high-capacity heat sinks to prevent thermal destruction and to manage temperature related electrical performance and life expectancy losses. To further exacerbate the concentrated cooling design, the heat sink must be passive, otherwise the power required for active cooling will reduce the overall conversion efficiency and economy. Multi-junction solar cells are currently favored over single junction cells, as they are more efficient and have a lower temperature coefficient (less loss in efficiency with an increase in temperature). The efficiency of both cell types rises with increased concentration; multi-junction efficiency rises faster. Multi-junction solar cells, originally designed for non-concentrating PV on space-based satellites, have been re-designed due to the high-current density encountered with CPV (typically 8 A/cm^{2} at 500 suns). Though the cost of multi-junction solar cells is roughly 100 times that of conventional silicon cells of the same area, the small cell area employed makes the relative costs of cells in each system comparable and the system economics favor the multi-junction cells. Multi-junction cell efficiency has now reached 44% in production cells.

The 44% value given above is for a specific set of conditions known as "standard test conditions". These include a specific spectrum, an incident optical power of 850 W/m^{2}, and a cell temperature of 25 °C. In a concentrating system, the cell will typically operate under conditions of variable spectrum, lower optical power, and higher temperature. The optics needed to concentrate the light have limited efficiency themselves, in the range of 75–90%. Taking these factors into account, a solar module incorporating a 44% multi-junction cell might deliver a DC efficiency around 36%. Under similar conditions, a crystalline silicon module would deliver an efficiency of less than 18%.

When high concentration is needed (500–1000 times), as occurs in the case of high efficiency multi-junction solar cells, it is likely that it will be crucial for commercial success at the system level to achieve such concentration with a sufficient acceptance angle. This allows tolerance in mass production of all components, relaxes the module assembling and system installation, and decreasing the cost of structural elements. Since the main goal of CPV is to make solar energy inexpensive, there are only a few surfaces that can be used. Decreasing the number of elements and achieving high acceptance angle, can be relaxed optical and mechanical requirements, such as accuracy of the optical surfaces profiles, the module assembling, the installation, the supporting structure, etc. To this end, improvements in sun-shape modelling at the system design stage may lead to higher system efficiencies.

== Reliability ==
The higher capital costs, lesser standardization, and added engineering and operational complexities (in comparison to zero and low-concentration PV technologies) make long-life performance a critical demonstration goal for the first generations of CPV technologies. Performance certification standards (UL 3703,UL 8703, IEC 62108, IEC 62670, IEC 62789, and IEC 62817) include stress testing conditions that may be useful to uncover some predominantly infant and early life (<1–2 year) failure modes at the system, tracker, module, receiver, and other sub-component levels. However, such standardized tests – as typically performed on only a small sampling of units – are generally incapable to evaluate comprehensive long-term lifetimes (10 to 25 or more years) for each unique system design and application under its broader range of actual – and occasionally unanticipated – operating conditions. Reliability of these complex systems is therefore assessed in the field, and is improved through aggressive product development cycles which are guided by the results of accelerated component/system aging, performance monitoring diagnostics, and failure analysis. Significant growth in the deployment of CPV can be anticipated once the concerns are better addressed to build confidence in system bankability.

=== Tracker durability and maintenance ===
The tracker and module support structure for a modern HCPV system must each remain accurate within 0.1°-0.3° in order to keep the solar resource adequately centered within the acceptance angle of the receiver collection optics, and thus concentrated onto the PV cells. This is a challenging requirement for any mechanical system that is subjected to the stresses of varying movements and loads. Economical procedures for periodic realignment and maintenance of the tracker may thus be required to preserve system performance over its expected lifetime.

=== Receiver temperature control ===
The maximum multi-junction solar cell operating temperatures (T_{max cell}) of HCPV systems are limited to less than about 110 °C on account of their intrinsic reliability limitation. This contrasts to CSP and other CHP systems which may be designed to function at temperatures in excess of several hundred degrees. More specifically, the cells are fabricated from a layering of thin-film III-V semiconductor materials having intrinsic lifetimes during operation that rapidly decrease with an Arrhenius-type temperature dependence. The system receiver must therefore provide for highly efficient and uniform cell cooling through sufficiently robust active and/or passive methods. In addition to material and design limitations in receiver heat-transfer performance, other extrinsic factors – such as the frequent system thermal cycling – further reduce the practical T_{max receiver} compatible with long system life to below about 80 °C.

== Installations ==
Concentrator photovoltaics technology established its presence in the solar industry during the period 2006 to 2015. The first HCPV power plant that exceeded 1 MW-level was commissioned in Spain in 2006. By the end of 2015, the number of CPV power plants (including both LCPV and HCPV) around the world accounted for a total installed capacity of 350 MW. Field data collected from a diversity of installations since about 2010 is also benchmarking system reliability over the long term.

Cumulative CPV Installations in MW by country by November 2014

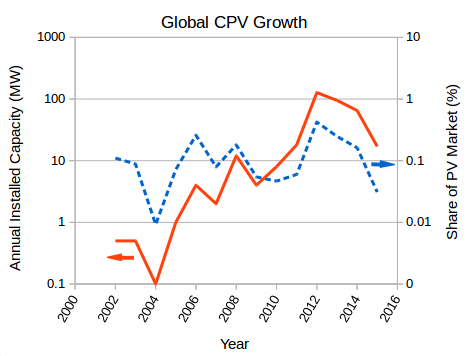
Yearly Installed CPV Capacity in MW from 2002 to 2015

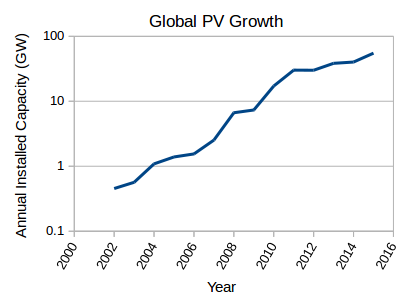
Yearly Installed PV Capacity in GW from 2002 to 2015

The emerging CPV segment has comprised ~0.1% of the fast-growing utility market for PV installations over the decade up to 2017. Unfortunately, following a rapid drop in traditional flat-panel PV prices, the near term outlook for CPV industry growth has faded as signaled by closure of the largest HCPV manufacturing facilities: including those of Suncore, Soitec, Amonix, and SolFocus. The higher cost and complexity of maintaining the precision HCPV dual-axis trackers has also been reported in some instances to be especially challenging. Nevertheless, the growth outlook for the PV industry as a whole continues to be strong, thus providing continued optimism that CPV technology will eventually demonstrate its place.

=== List of largest HCPV systems ===
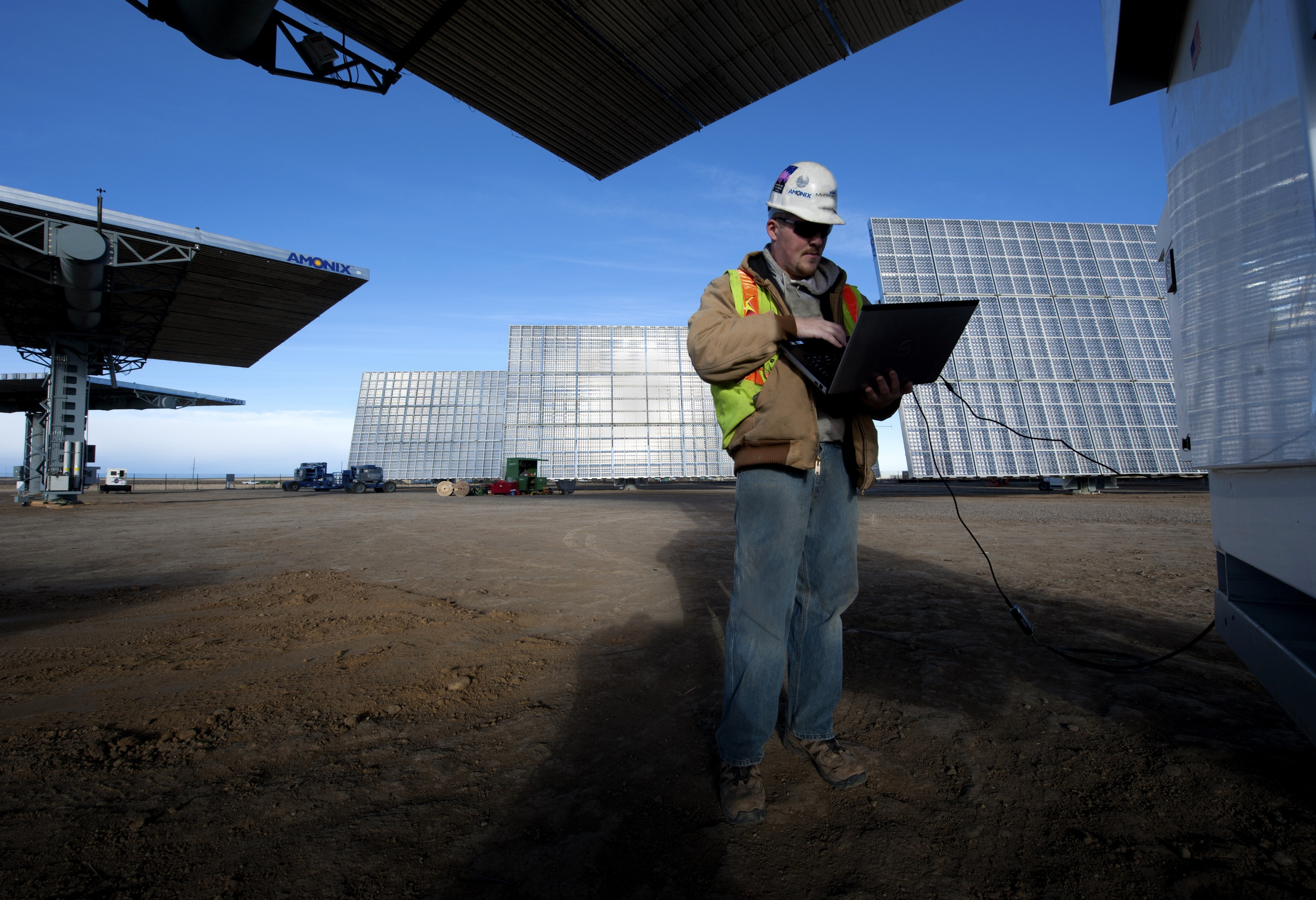
Field testing a system at a CPV powerplant

Similar to traditional PV, the peak DC rating of a system is specified as MW_{p} (or sometimes MW_{DC}) under concentrator standard test conditions (CSTC) of DNI=1000 W/m^{2}, AM1.5D, & T_{cell}=25 °C, as per the IEC 62670 standard convention. The AC production capacity is specified as MW_{AC} under IEC 62670 concentrator standard operating conditions (CSOC) of DNI=900 W/m^{2}, AM1.5D, T_{ambient}=20 °C, & Wind speed=2 m/s, and may include adjustments for inverter efficiency, higher/lower solar resource, and other facility-specific factors. The largest CPV power plant currently in operation is of 138 MW_{p} rating located in Golmud, China, hosted by Suncore Photovoltaics.

Power station	Rating (MW_{p})	Capacity (MW_{AC})	Year completed	Location	CPV vendor	Ref
Golmud (1 and 2)	137.8	110	2012–2013	in Golmud/Qinghai province/China	Suncore	
Touwsrivier CPV Project	44.2	36	2014	in Touwsrivier/Western Cape/South Africa	Soitec	
Alamosa Solar Project	35.3	30	2012	in Alamosa, Colorado/San Luis Valley/US	Amonix	
Hami (1, 2, and 3)	10.5	9.0	2013–2016	in Hami/Xinjiang province/China	Soitec-Focusic	
Navarra CPV Plant	9.1	7.8	2010	in Villafranca/Navarra province/Spain	Amonix-Guascor Foton	
Source: The CPV Consortium

=== List of HCPV systems in United States ===
Power station	Rating (MW_{p})	Capacity (MW_{AC})	Year completed	Location	CPV vendor	Owner/operator	Ref
Alamosa Solar Project	35.3	30	2012	Alamosa, Colorado	Amonix	Cogentrix	
Desert Green Solar Farm	7.80	6.3	2014	Borrego Springs, California	Soitec	Invenergy	
Hatch Solar Energy Center	5.88	5.0	2011	Hatch, New Mexico	Amonix	NextEra Energy	
University of Arizona CPV Array	2.38	2.0	2011	Tucson, Arizona	Amonix	Arzon Solar	
Newberry Springs CPV Power Plant	1.68	1.5	2013	Newberry Springs, California	Soitec	STACE	
Crafton Hills College Solar Farm	1.61	1.3	2012	Yucaipa, California	SolFocus	Crafton Hills College	
Victor Valley College Solar Farm	1.26	1.0	2010	Victorville, California	SolFocus	Victor Valley College	
Eubank Landfill Solar Array	1.21	1.0	2013	Albuquerque, New Mexico	Suncore	Emcore Solar	
Questa Solar Facility	1.17	1.0	2010	Questa, New Mexico	Soitec	Chevron	
Fort Irwin CPV Project	1.12	1.0	2015	Fort Irwin, California	Soitec	US DOD	
Source: The CPV Consortium

=== List of LCPV systems in United States ===
Power station	Capacity (MW_{AC})	Year completed	Location	Coordinates	CPV vendor	Owner/operator	Ref
Fort Churchill Solar Array	19.9	2015	Yerington, Nevada	39°07′41″N 119°08′24″W	SunPower	Apple Inc./ NV Energy	
Springerville Solar Farm	6.0	2013	Springerville, Arizona	34°17′40″N 109°16′17″W	SunPower	Tucson Electric Power	
ASU Polytechnic CPV Array	1.0	2012	Mesa, Arizona	33°17′37″N 111°40′38″W	SunPower	SunPower	

== Concentrated photovoltaics and thermal ==
Concentrator photovoltaics and thermal (CPVT), also sometimes called combined heat and power solar (CHAPS) or hybrid thermal CPV, is a cogeneration or micro cogeneration technology used in the field of concentrator photovoltaics that produces usable heat and electricity within the same system. CPVT at high concentrations of over 100 suns (HCPVT) utilizes similar components as HCPV, including dual-axis tracking and multi-junction photovoltaic cells. A fluid actively cools the integrated thermal–photovoltaic receiver, and simultaneously transports the collected heat.

Typically, one or more receivers and a heat exchanger operate within a closed thermal loop. To maintain efficient overall operation and avoid damage from thermal runaway, the demand for heat from the secondary side of the exchanger must be consistently high. Collection efficiencies exceeding 70% are anticipated under optimal operating conditions, with up to 35% electric and exceeding 40% thermal for HCPVT. Net operating efficiencies may be substantially lower depending on how well a system is engineered to match the demands of the particular thermal application.

The maximum temperature of CPVT systems is too low, typically below 80–90 °C, to alone power a boiler for additional steam-based cogeneration of electricity. These very low temperatures compared to CSP systems also make CPVT less compatible with efficient and economic thermal energy storage (TES). The captured thermal energy may nevertheless be directly employed in district heating, water heating and air conditioning, desalination or process heat. For thermal applications having lower or intermittent demand, a system may be augmented with a switchable heat dump to the external environment in order to safeguard cell life and maintain reliable photovoltaic output, despite the resulting reduction in net operating efficiency.

HCPVT active cooling enables the use of much higher power thermal–photovoltaic receiver units, generating typically 1–100 kilowatts (kW) electric, as compared to HCPV systems that mostly rely upon passive cooling of single ~20 W cells. Such high-power receivers utilize dense arrays of cells mounted on a high-efficiency heat sink. Minimizing the number of individual receiver units is a simplification that may ultimately yield improvement in the overall balance of system costs, manufacturability, maintainability/upgradeability, and reliability. A system combining receivers sized up to 1 MW_{electric}/2 MW_{thermal} with TES using an accompanying organic Rankine cycle generator to provide electricity on demand operated in 2023 in Australia, at a combined 4 MW power and 51 MWh storage.

This 240 x 80 mm 1,000 suns CPV heat sink design thermal animation, was created using high resolution CFD analysis, and shows temperature contoured heat sink surface and flow trajectories as predicted.

=== Demonstration projects ===
The economics of a mature CPVT industry is anticipated to be competitive, despite the large recent cost reductions and gradual efficiency improvements for conventional silicon PV (which can be installed alongside conventional CSP to provide for similar electrical+thermal generation capabilities). CPVT may currently be economical for niche markets having all of the following application characteristics:

- high solar direct normal irradiance (DNI)
- tight space constraints for placement of a solar collector array
- high and constant demand for low-temperature (<80 °C) heat
- high cost of grid electricity
- access to backup sources of power or cost-efficient storage (electrical and thermal)

Utilization of a power purchase agreement (PPA), government assistance programs, and innovative financing schemes are also helping potential manufacturers and users to mitigate the risks of early CPVT technology adoption.

CPVT equipment offerings ranging from low (LCPVT) to high (HCPVT) concentration are now being deployed by several startup ventures. As such, longer-term viability of the technical and/or business approach being pursued by any individual system provider is typically speculative. Notably, the minimum viable products of startups can vary widely in their attention to reliability engineering. Nevertheless, the following incomplete compilation is offered to assist with the identification of some early industry trends.

LCPVT systems at ~14x concentration using reflective trough concentrators, and receiver pipes clad with silicon cells having dense interconnects, have been assembled by Cogenra with a claimed 75% efficiency (~15–20% electric, 60% thermal). Several such systems are in operation for more than five years as of 2015, and similar systems are being produced by Absolicon and Idhelio at 10x and 50x concentration, respectively.

HCPVT offerings at over 700x concentration have more recently emerged, and may be classified into three power tiers. Third tier systems are distributed generators consisting of large arrays of ~20 W single-cell receiver/collector units, similar to those previously pioneered by Amonix and SolFocus for HCPV. Second tier systems utilize localized dense-arrays of cells that produce 1–100 kW of electrical power output per receiver/generator unit. First tier systems exceed 100 kW of electrical output and are most aggressive in targeting the utility market.

Several HCPVT system providers are listed in the following table. Nearly all are early demonstration systems which have been in service for under five years as of 2015. Collected thermal power is typically 1.5x–2x the rated electrical power.

Provider	Country	Concentrator type	Unit size in kW_{e}		Ref
Provider	Country	Concentrator type	Generator	Receiver	Ref
		Tier 1 -			
Raygen	Australia	Large heliostat array	250	250	
		Tier 2 -			
Airlight Energy/dsolar	Switzerland	Large dish	12	12	
Rehnu	United States	Large dish	6.4	0.8	
Solartron	Canada	Large dish	20	20	
Southwest Solar	United States	Large Dish	20	20	
Sun Oyster	Germany	Large trough + lens	4.7	2.35	
Zenith Solar/Suncore	Israel/China/US	Large dish	4.5	2.25	
		Tier 3 -			
BSQ Solar	Spain	Small lens array	13.44	0.02	
Silex Power	Malta	Small dish array	16	0.04	
Solergy	Italy/US	Small lens array	20	0.02	

== See also ==
- Concentrated solar power (CSP)
- Luminescent solar concentrator
- Concentrated photovoltaic thermal hybrid solar collectors (CPVT)
