= Tech Parks Arizona =

Research park in Tucson, Arizona

- Formation: 1994
- Founder: University of Arizona
- Type: Research park operator
- Location: Tucson, Arizona, United States
- Region served: Southern Arizona

Tech Parks Arizona is a university-affiliated research and technology organization in Tucson, Arizona, operated by the University of Arizona. Established in 1994, it manages two research parks — UA Tech Park at Rita Road and UA Tech Park at The Bridges — as well as the University of Arizona Center for Innovation (UACI). This business incubator network supports technology commercialization and regional economic development. In 2024, the organization celebrated its 30th anniversary, marking three decades of growth as home to more than 100 companies employing over 6,000 workers and contributing $2 billion annually to the regional economy.

== History ==
Tech Parks Arizona was created in 1994 following the purchase of a former IBM campus by the University of Arizona. The site evolved into the UA Tech Park, a hub for technology development in Southern Arizona. IBM's storage division has remained a tenant since the park's founding, advancing magnetic tape storage technologies. In that same year, the UA Tech Park marked its 30th year as a Tucson tech hub.

In 2010, Vail Academy and High School became the nation's first K–12 institution located on a university research park, setting a national precedent for integrating education and innovation.

=== Role in the Space Shuttle Challenger investigation (1986) ===
After the Space Shuttle Challenger disaster in 1986, data recovery efforts took place at what is now the UA Tech Park at Rita Road. The site was then IBM's Tucson Storage Division, a center for magnetic-tape and data storage research. NASA sent flight-recorder tapes recovered from the Atlantic Ocean to the IBM facility, where engineers conducted one of the most difficult data-recovery operations in history. In specialized cleanrooms, IBM scientists used chemical baths, custom machinery, and manual handling to separate and restore the saltwater-damaged tapes. Their work recovered most of the mission's recorded data, including key telemetry that supported the federal investigation. The event demonstrated the Tucson facility's engineering expertise and remains a key part of its technological legacy before becoming Tech Parks Arizona.

== Facilities ==
=== UA Tech Park (Rita Road) ===
Located in southeast Tucson, this 1,267-acre site includes office, lab, and research facilities, including dry and wet labs, as well as the Solar Zone.

=== Solar Zone ===
The Solar Zone is a multi-technology solar demonstration area at the UA Tech Park. Developed in partnership with Tucson Electric Power, it spans more than 200 acres and has a generation capacity of about 23 megawatts of power for research, testing, and commercialization of solar technologies. The university and TEP have a long history of working together to expand educational opportunities and promote renewable energy.

=== UA Tech Park at The Bridges ===
Situated near downtown Tucson, this 65-acre urban site supports high-tech growth. Vertical development began in 2020, and the first corporate tenant, Raytheon, signed a lease at The Refinery in 2023. In December 2022, the University of Arizona opened the facility for balloon-borne astronomy experiments.

=== University of Arizona Center for Innovation (UACI) ===
UACI is an incubator network that supports science and technology companies through a structured mentoring program and facilities across Southern Arizona and abroad.
