= Hatch Solar Energy Center =

Hatch Solar photovoltaic power station

- Country: United States
- Location: Hatch, New Mexico
- Coordinates: 32°37′34″N 107°15′32″W
- Status: Operational
- Commission date: 2011
- Owner: NextEra Energy

Solar farm
- Type: Flat-panel PV dual-axis tracking
- Site area: 37 acres (15 ha)

Power generation
- Units operational: 84 Amonix 7700
- Nameplate capacity: 5.88 MW_{p}, 5.0 MW_{AC}
- Capacity factor: 27.5% (average 2017-2020)
- Annual net output: 12.0 GWh, 325 MW·h/acre

The Hatch Solar Energy Center is a 5.88 MW_{p} (5.0 MW_{AC}) photovoltaic power station. It was built by Blattner Energy using 84 dual-axis trackers and Amonix 7700 concentrator photovoltaics (CPV) panels, each of which contains 7,560 Fresnel lenses to concentrate sunlight 500 times onto multijunction photovoltaic cells. It was the largest CPV facility in North America when it was completed in 2011. The facility was subsequently repowered with SunPower panels that use high-efficiency monocrystalline silicon cells without concentration. The output is being sold to El Paso Electric, under a 25-year power purchase agreement (PPA). Annual electricity production is expected to be about 11,000 MW·h/year.

== Electricity production ==
Generation (MW·h) of Hatch Solar Energy Center
Year	Jan	Feb	Mar	Apr	May	Jun	Jul	Aug	Sep	Oct	Nov	Dec	Total
2011	0	0	0	0	0	761	792	769	722	766	647	552	5,010
2012	651	660	831	777	892	821	864	721	724	782	656	933	9,312
2013	542	584	740	709	800	764	750	734	704	774	574	550	8,225
2014	252	243	304	294	547	1214	1009	990	892	947	717	583	7,993
2015	385	513	601	705	740	694	662	683	595	500	459	413	6,951
2016	331	402	500	507	559	510	540	678	810	987	883	740	7,447
2017	520	773	1111	1192	1292	1225	1168	1096	972	999	720	626	11,694
2018	571	672	869	1053	1213	1304	1136	1135	1091	813	670	485	11,012
2019	622	655	976	1149	1224	1376	1303	1326	1095	1076	669	487	11,959
2020	921	937	1029	1361	1450	1346	1261	1122	1084	1107	945	964	13,527
2021	921	917	1183	1196	1400	1165	1160	1070	1000	1129			
Average Annual Production for years 2017-2020 →													12,048

== See also ==
- Alamosa Solar Generating Project
- List of photovoltaic power stations
- Renewable energy in the United States
- Solar power in New Mexico
- Solar power in the United States
