= Balance of system =

Photovoltaic system components other than the panels

The balance of system (BOS) encompasses all components of a photovoltaic system other than the photovoltaic panels. This includes wiring, switches, a mounting system, one or many solar inverters, a battery bank and battery charger.

Other optional components include renewable energy credit revenue-grade meter, maximum power point tracker (MPPT), GPS solar tracker, Energy management software, solar concentrators, solar irradiance sensors, anemometer, or task-specific accessories designed to meet specialized requirements for a system owner. In addition, concentrated photovoltaics systems require optical lenses or mirrors and sometimes a cooling system.

In addition, ground-mounted, large photovoltaic power station require equipment and facilities, such as grid connections, office facilities, and concrete. Land is sometimes included as part of the BOS as well.

== Balance of plant ==
A similar term to balance of system is balance of plant (BOP) which is generally used in the context of power engineering and applies to all the supporting components and systems of the power plant which are needed to produce the energy. These may include suitable transformers, inverters, cabling, switching and control equipment, protection equipment, power conditioners, support structures, etc., depending on the type of plant.

== Cost of BOS ==
Cost of balance of system will include the cost of the hardware (and software, if applicable), labor, permitting Interconnection and Inspection (PII) fees, and any other fees that may apply. For large commercial solar systems, the cost of BOS may include the cost of land and building, etc. The cost of BOS can be about two thirds of the total cost.

== Downward trend ==
While the cost of solar panels is coming down appreciably, the cost of BOS is not showing the same rate of decline. The solar cell technology is still evolving and improving, and costs are being reduced fast. The balance of systems consists mostly of items which are not specific to solar technology. As an example, the mounting structures are quite usual and the technology may already be mature, benefitting little from further innovation and research.
