= Alamosa Solar Generating Project =

Concentrated photovoltaic power station in Colorado, United States

Alamosa Solar Generating Plant
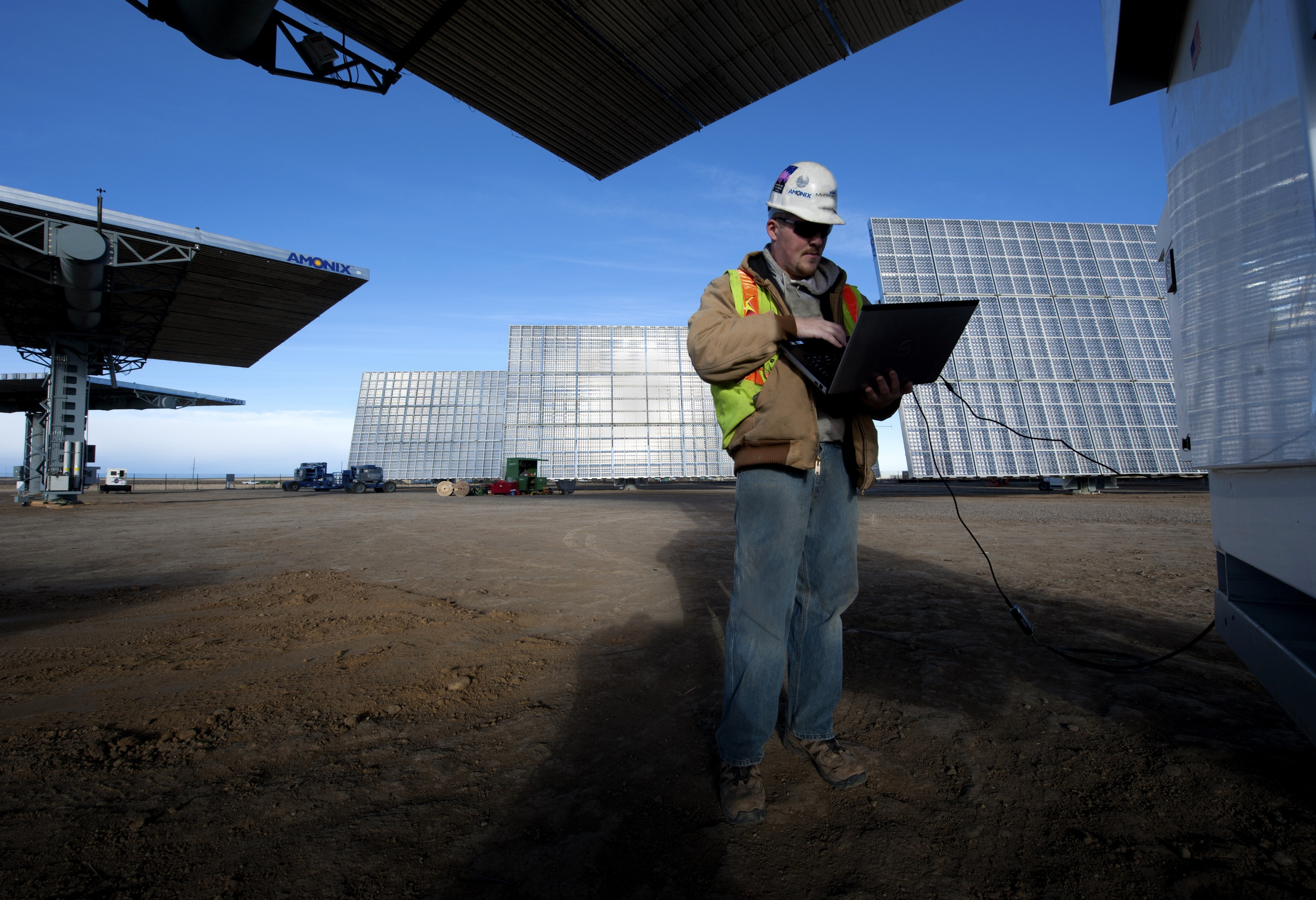
- Country: United States
- Location: San Luis Valley, Mosca, Colorado
- Coordinates: 37°35′54″N 105°57′07″W
- Status: Operational
- Construction began: September 2011
- Commission date: May 10, 2012
- Construction cost: US$90.6 million
- Owners: KEPCO; COPA Fund
- Operators: Cogentrix Services, KEPCO of Alamosa

Solar farm
- Type: CPV
- Site area: 225 acres (91 ha)

Power generation
- Units operational: 504 Amonix 7700
- Nameplate capacity: 35.3 MW_{p}, 30.0 MW_{AC}
- Capacity factor: 22.8% (average 2013–2020)
- Annual net output: 59.9 GW·h, 266 MW·h/acre

External links
- Website: kepcoalamosa.com

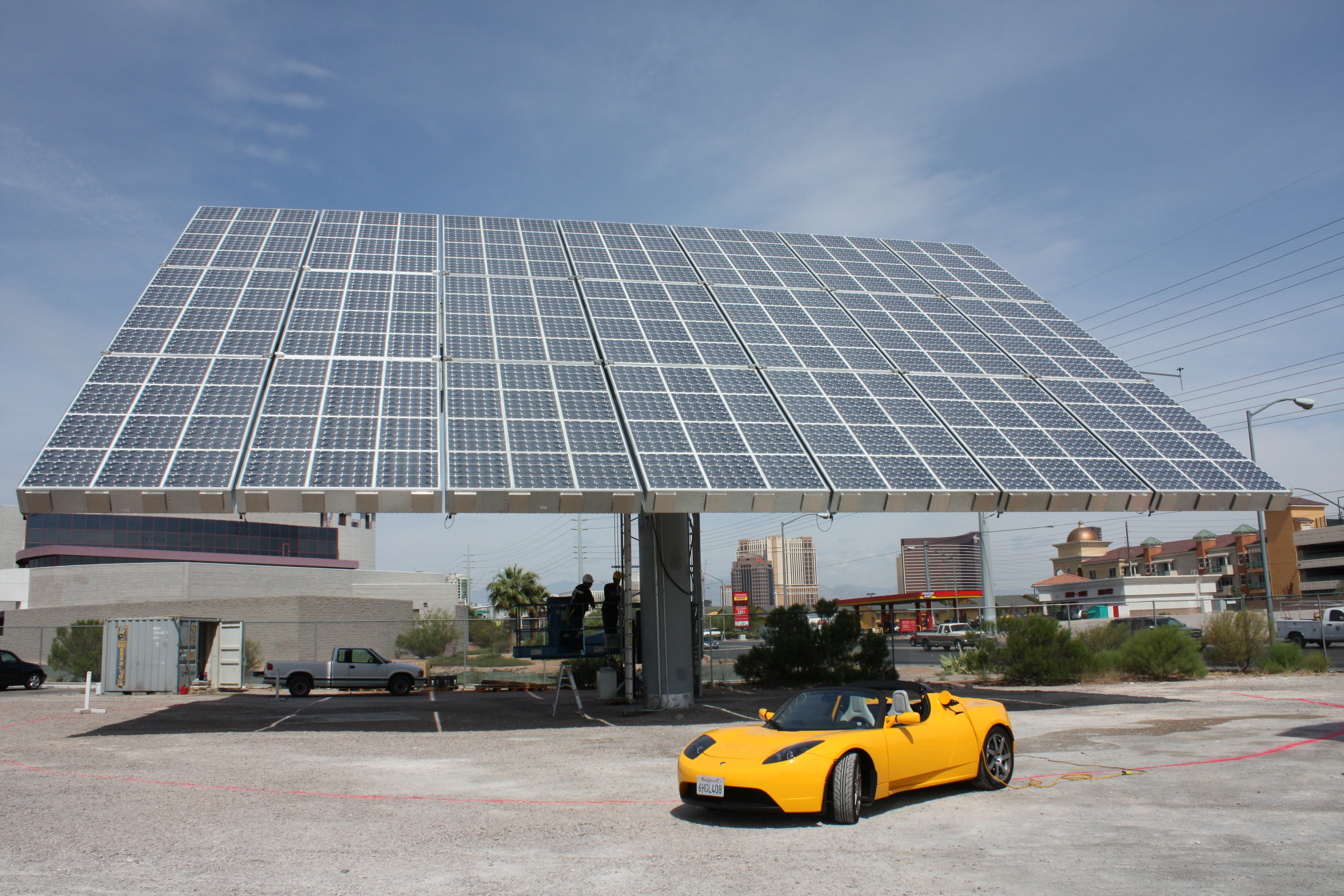
A single Amonix 7700 system

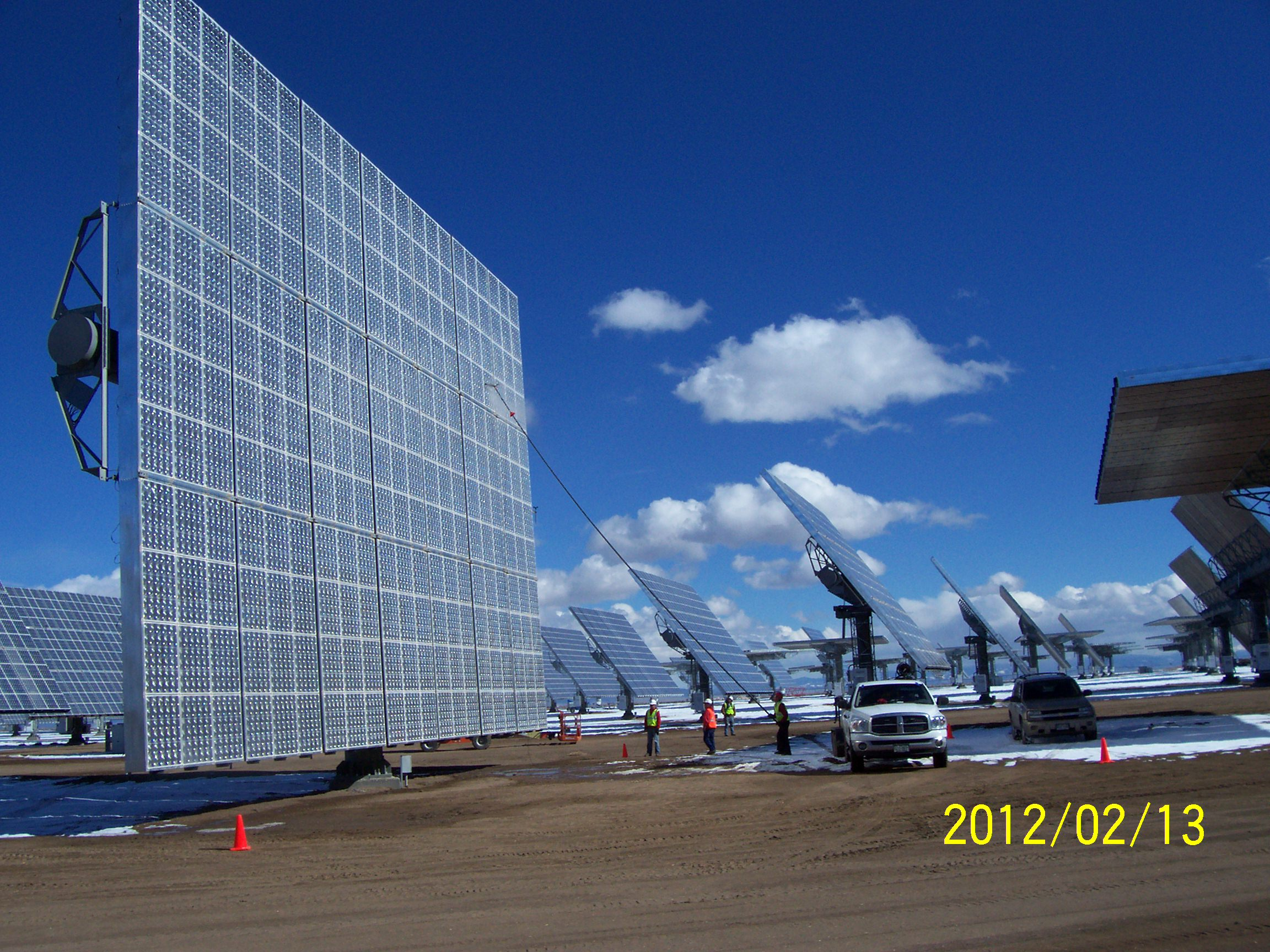

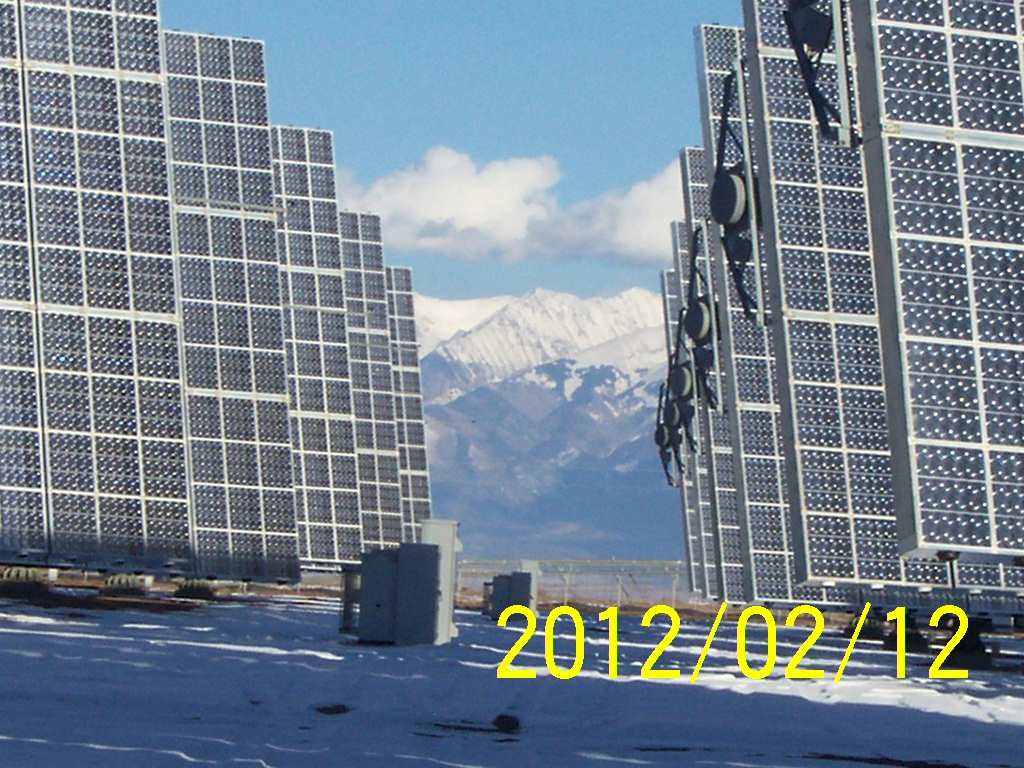

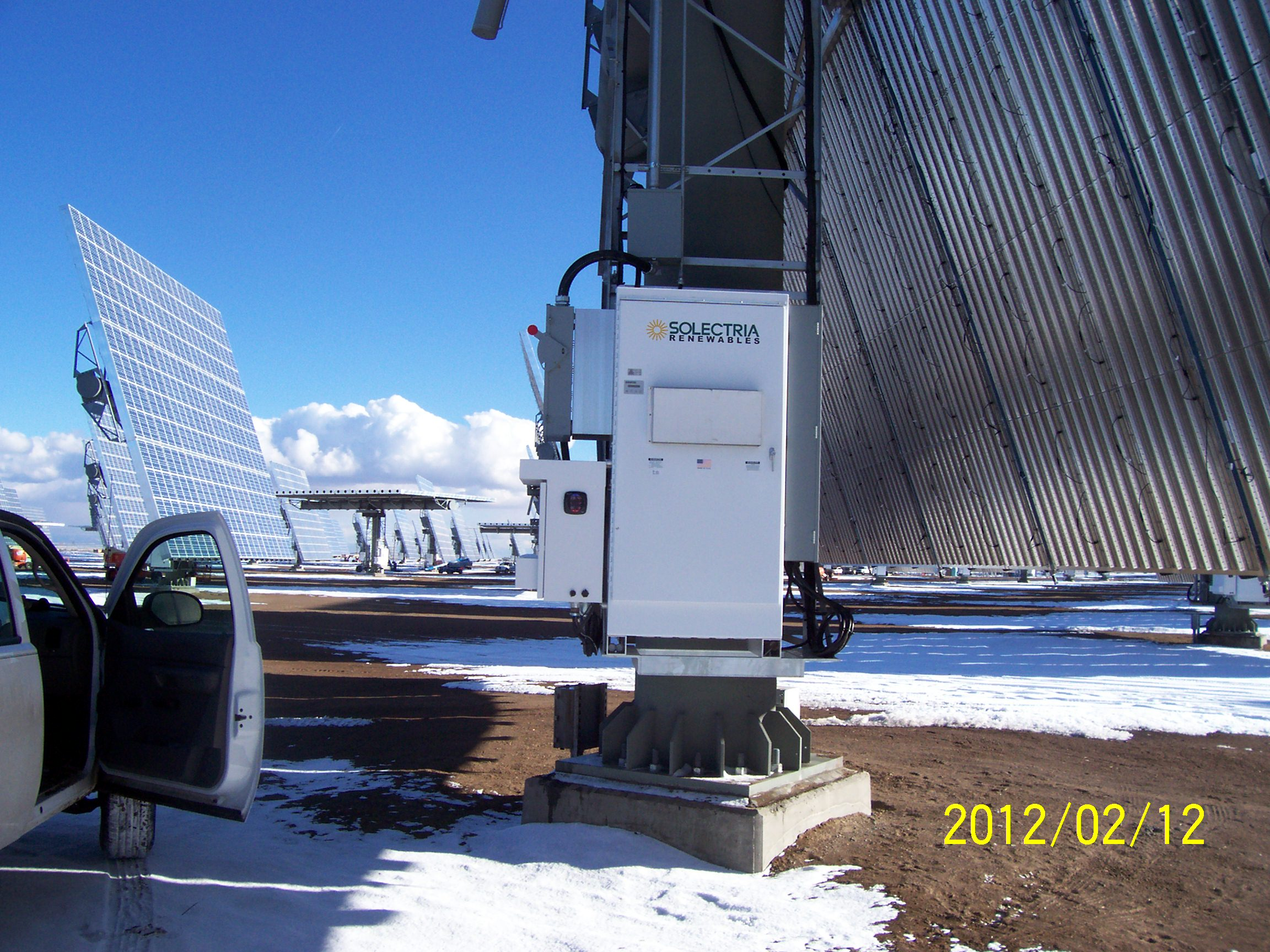

The Alamosa Solar Generating Plant is a 35.3 MW_{p} (30.0 MW_{AC}) concentrator photovoltaics (CPV) power station, the largest in the world when it was completed, in May 2012. It is currently the world's third largest operating CPV facility. The output is being sold to Public Service of Colorado, a subsidiary of Xcel Energy, under a long term power purchase agreement.

== Facility construction details ==
The facility consists of 504 dual-axis Amonix 7700 solar tracking systems and Solectria grid-connected 70 kW inverters. Each system supports seven CPV "MegaModules" which are each rated to produce about 10 kW_{p}. Each module contains 1,080 Fresnel lenses to concentrate sunlight 500 times onto multi-junction solar cells, allowing a greater efficiency than conventional photovoltaic power plants.

The facility is sited on 225 acres at an elevation of 7,500 feet in the sunny and cool San Luis Valley, along with several other solar farms. It was built by Mortenson Construction and is the world's largest assembly of Amonix CPV technology.

== Ownership, funding, and operations ==
Construction was financed in September 2011 by a special purpose subsidiary of the Goldman Sachs Group's Cogentrix Energy Power Management with a US$90.6 million loan that is guaranteed by the U.S. Department of Energy. The facility became operational less than 9 months later, in April 2012. In August 2016, Cogentrix sold the project for US$35 million to Korea Electric Power Corporation and its COPA pension fund, both of which are majority held by the South Korean government. Cogentrix Services continues to operate and maintain the facility.

== Electricity production ==
Generation (MW·h) of Cogentrix of Alamosa
Year	Jan	Feb	Mar	Apr	May	Jun	Jul	Aug	Sep	Oct	Nov	Dec	Total
2012				5,528	6,899	7,639	6,521	5,464	5,946	6,850	5,385	3,887	54,119
2013	4,934	4,933	5,051	4,535	6,004	6,422	5,675	6,043	5,851	6,593	4,787	4,764	65,592
2014	4,584	5,143	5,937	4,989	5,690	6,390	5,133	5,899	5,766	5,770	4,851	3,502	63,654
2015	3,358	4,544	6,159	5,504	4,858	6,054	4,187	5,561	5,488	4,404	5,019	3,719	58,855
2016	4,229	5,010	5,309	4,702	5,964	6,523	7,128	4,913	5,543	5,814	4,924	3,789	63,848
2017	2,380	3,707	5,187	5,726	6,750	7,315	6,345	5,310	4,448	5,267	3,360	3,450	59,245
2018	3,068	3,608	4,666	5,655	6,517	7,003	6,104	6,094	5,857	4,368	3,600	2,607	59,148
2019	2,852	3,005	4,476	5,270	5,610	6,310	5,973	6,080	5,019	4,934	3,066	2,235	54,831
2020	2,969	3,128	4,792	5,355	6,219	6,029	6,248	5,093	4,963	3,740	3,222	2,435	54,193
Average annual production (years 2013–2020):													59,921

== Comparison to flat-panel photovoltaic plants ==
Findings of a 2013 NREL land use report showed CPV as having the highest land-energy-density potential of any photovoltaic technology surveyed in the United States, requiring an average 2.8 acres/GW·h/yr for power plants larger than 20 MW. Flat-panel fixed and single-axis tracking plants of similar capacity typically used 3.7 and 3.3 acres/GW·h/yr, respectively. Based on current energy production statistics, land use for the 225 acre Alamosa CPV project averages 3.7 acres/GW·h/yr (= 270 MW·h/acre annual production).

== See also ==
- Hatch Solar Energy Center
- Touwsrivier CPV Solar Project
- Hooper Solar PV Power Plant
- San Luis Valley Solar Ranch
- Solar power in Colorado
- Solar power in the United States
