= Nominal power (photovoltaic) =

Nameplate capacity of a photovoltaic devices

Nominal power (or peak power) is the nameplate capacity of photovoltaic (PV) devices, such as solar cells, modules and systems. It is determined by measuring the electric current and voltage in a circuit, while varying the resistance under precisely defined conditions. The nominal power is important for designing an installation in order to correctly dimension its cabling and converters.

Nominal power is also called peak power because the test conditions at which it is determined are similar to the maximum irradiation from the sun. Thus this quantity approximates the theoretical maximum production of the panel on a clear sunny day with the panel oriented perpendicular to the sun. The nominal power is generally not reached under actual radiation conditions. In practice, actual conditions will allow for approximately 15-20% lower generation due to the considerable heating of the solar cells.

Moreover, in installations where electricity is converted to AC, such as solar power plants, the actual total electricity generation capacity is limited by the inverter, which is usually sized at a lower peak capacity than the solar system for economic reasons. Since the peak DC power is reached only for a few hours each year, using a smaller inverter allows financial savings on the inverter while clipping (wasting) only a very small portion of the total energy production. The capacity of the power plant after DC-AC conversion is usually reported in W_{AC} as opposed to W_{DC} or Watt-peak (W_{p}).

== Standard test conditions ==
The nominal power of PV devices is measured under standard test conditions (STC), specified in standards such as IEC 61215, IEC 61646 and UL 1703. Specifically, the light intensity is 1000 W/m^{2}, with a spectrum similar to sunlight hitting the Earth's surface at latitude 35°N in the summer (airmass 1.5), the temperature of the cells being 25 °C. The power is measured while varying the resistive load on the module between an open and closed circuit (between maximum and minimum resistance). The highest power thus measured is the 'nominal' power of the module in watts. This nominal power divided by the light power that falls on a given area of a photovoltaic device (area × 1000 W/m^{2}) defines its efficiency, the ratio of the device's electrical output to the incident energy.

== Units ==
In the context of domestic PV installations, the kilowatt (symbol kW) is the most common unit for nominal power, for example P_{peak} = 1 kW. Colloquial English sometimes conflates the quantity power and its unit by using the non-standard label watt-peak (symbol W_{p}), possibly prefixed as in kilowatt-peak (kW_{p}), megawatt-peak (MW_{p}), etc. For example, a photovoltaic installation may be described as having "one kilowatt-peak of power" ("P = 1 kW_{p}"). However, in the International System of Units (SI), the physical unit (and its symbol) should not be used to provide specific information about the conditions assumed for measuring a given physical quantity.

== Conversion from DC to AC ==
Solar power needs to be converted from direct current (DC, as it is generated from the panel) to alternating current (AC) to be injected into the power grid. Since solar panels generate peak power only for few hours each day, and DC to AC converters are expensive, the converters are usually sized to be smaller than the peak DC power of the panels. This means that for some hours each day the peaks are "clipped" and the extra energy is lost. This has very little impact on the total energy generated throughout a year, but saves considerable amount of balance of system (BOS) costs. Due to under-sizing of converters, AC ratings of solar plants are generally significantly lower than DC ratings, by as much as 30%. This in turn increases the calculated yearly capacity factor of the plant. The downrating of peak power and the related clipping is different from the losses incurred in the conversion from DC to AC, which happen at any power level and are usually relatively small.

Most countries refer to installed nominal nameplate capacity of PV systems and panels by counting DC power in watt-peak, denoted as W_{p}, or sometimes W_{DC}, as do most manufacturers and organizations of the photovoltaic industry, such as Solar Energy Industries Association (SEIA), the European Photovoltaic Industry Association (EPIA) or the International Energy Agency (IEA-PVPS). Some grid regulations may limit the AC output of a PV system to as little as 70% of its nominal DC peak power (Germany). Because of these two different metrics, international organizations need to reconvert official domestic figures from the above-mentioned countries back to the raw DC output in order to report coherent global PV-deployment in watt-peak.

In order to clarify whether the nominal power output (watt-peak, W_{p}) is in fact DC or already converted into AC, it is sometimes explicitly denoted as MW_{DC} and MW_{AC} or kW_{DC} and kW_{AC}. The converted W_{AC} is also often written as "MW (AC)", "MWac" or "MWAC". Just as for W_{p}, these units are non SI-compliant but widely used. In California, for example, where the rated capacity is given in MW_{AC}, a downrating of 15 percent in the conversion from DC to AC is assumed.

== Power output in real conditions ==
The output of photovoltaic systems varies with the intensity of sunshine and other conditions. The more sun, the more power the PV module will generate. Losses, compared to performance in optimal conditions, will occur due to non-ideal alignment of the module in tilt and/or azimuth, higher temperature, module power mismatch (since panels in a system are connected in series the lowest performing module defines performance of the string it belongs to), aging factor, soiling and DC to AC conversion. The power a module generates in real conditions can exceed the nominal power when the intensity of sunlight exceeds 1000 W/m^{2} (which corresponds roughly to midday in summer in, for example, Germany), or when sun irradiation close to 1000 W/m^{2} happens at lower temperatures.
