= Mayumana troupe =

Israeli dance troupe

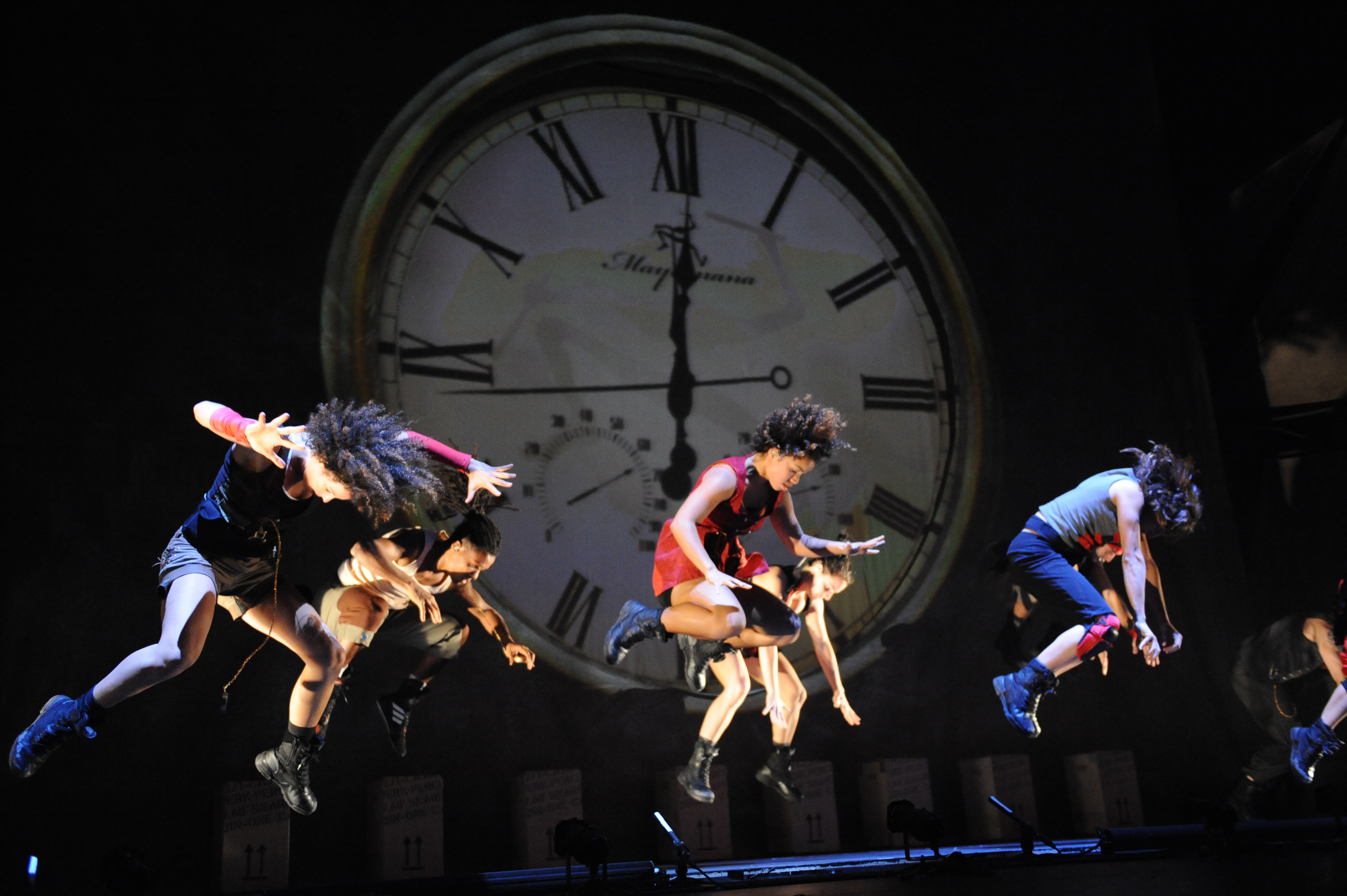
Momentum show

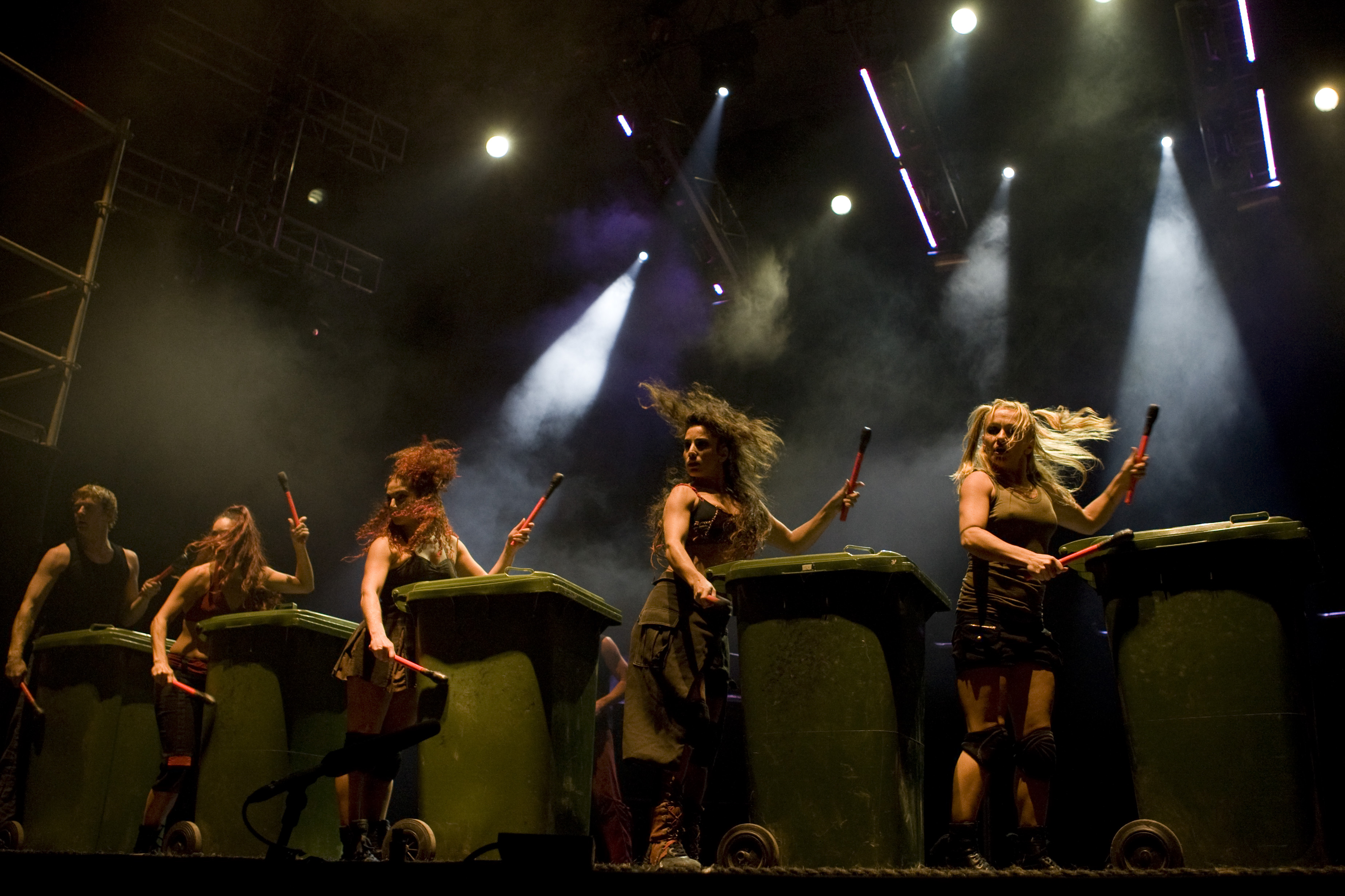
Mayumana troupe

Mayumana (Hebrew: מיומנה) is an Israeli dance troupe that combines dance, song and percussion.

== History ==
Mayumana was established in Tel Aviv by Eylon Nuphar and Boaz Berman in 1996. The name of the troupe is derived from the Hebrew word for "skill."

In 1996–2007, Mayumana performed over 5,000 shows in 30 countries, reaching an audience of more than 3.5 million people.

Mayumana's "BE" show was performed with an international cast of dancers, actors, gymnasts, musicians and singers. The show uses instruments, voices and bodies to create a "visual smorgasbord of dance, movement and theater."

Momentum, created by Eylon Nuphar and Boaz Berman, is a rhythmic dance performance in which the dancers drum on boxes, buckets and floors with their hands and feet.

Mayumana also performs a children's show, ADRABA. In 2006, the troupe collaborated with Israeli singer/songwriter David Broza.

== Media ==
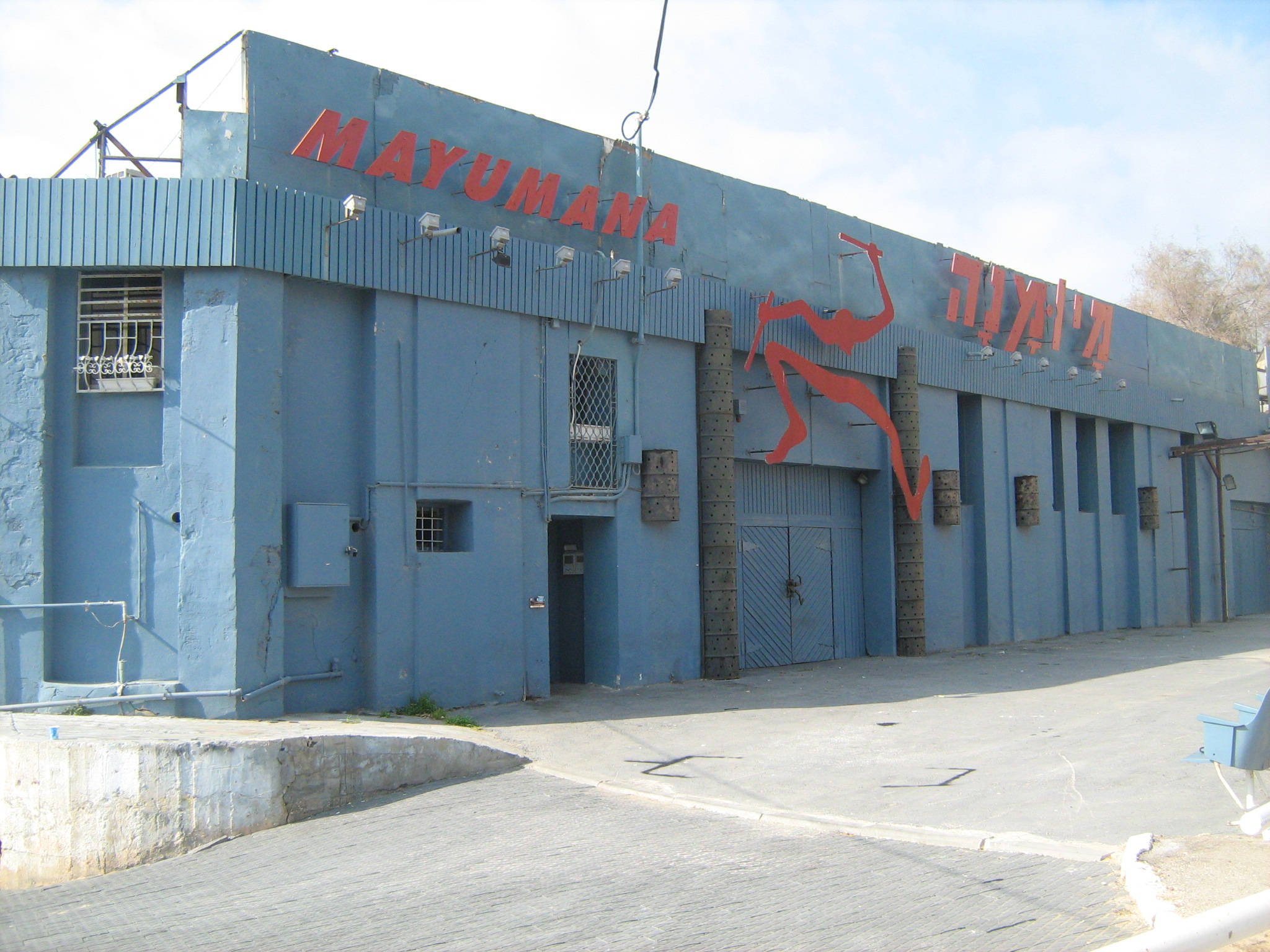
Mayumana House in Jaffa

In 2011, the Arava Power Company, an Israeli solar energy firm, partnered with Mayumana to create a promotional video for the Israel EcoCinema Festival. The video was used a second time as Arava Power Company's video-invitation to the historic launch of Ketura Sun, the first solar field in Israel.

== Awards ==
Mayumana won the Award for Excellence in Theater Production by Israel's National Academy of Theater.

== Notable members ==
- Tzachi Halevy (born 1975), film and television actor and singer

== See also ==
- Culture of Israel
- Music of Israel
- Dance of Israel
