= Xitieshan Solar Park =

Photovoltaic power station Qinghai, China

- Country: China
- Location: Qinghai Province
- Coordinates: 37°18′34″N 95°29′05″E
- Status: Operational
- Commission date: 30 September 2011
- Owner: CGN

Solar farm
- Type: Flat-panel PV

Power generation
- Nameplate capacity: 100 MW_{P}
- Annual net output: 164 GWh

CGN's Xitieshan Solar Park is a 100 megawatt (MW) photovoltaic power station located in the Qinghai Province, China. Construction was completed in three phases, Xitieshan Phase I was 10 MW, Xitieshan Phase II was 30 MW, and Xitieshan Phase III was 60 MW. It was completed on 30 September 2011, and at the time was the largest grid connected photovoltaic power station in the world.

== See also ==
- Solar power in China
- Golmud Solar Park
- Photovoltaic power station
- List of photovoltaic power stations
