= Jinniu =

Jinniu may refer to:

- Jinniu, Chengdu, a central urban district of the City of Chengdu, the capital of Sichuan, China
- Jinniu Energy, now Jizhong Energy, a state-owned coal company in Hebei, China
