= Huang Ming (entrepreneur) =

- 黄鸣
- Born: March 10, 1958 (age 68); Taixing, Jiangsu, China
- Education: China University of Petroleum
- Occupations: Founder, Chairman & CEO of Himin Solar; Politician
- Awards: Right Livelihood Award

Huang Ming (Chinese: 黄鸣; born 1958) is a Chinese solar energy researcher and entrepreneur. He established the solar water heater manufacturing company Himin Solar, which was central in the development of the Solar Valley in the city of Dezhou.

He was a deputy to the 10th and the 11th National People's Congress. He drafted the Law on Renewable Energy and united other representatives in support of it. As a politician he has played a central role in developing renewable energy in China, including the passing of the Renewable Energy Act in 2005. The Renewable Energy Act was passed in 2005 and took effect in 2006, a substantial achievement that echoed globally. According to Hurun Report's China Rich List 2013, he has an estimated fortune of US$330 million, and was ranked 945th richest person in China.

Huang Ming was awarded the Right Livelihood Award in 2011 "for his outstanding success in the development and mass-deployment of cutting-edge technologies for harnessing solar energy, thereby showing how dynamic emerging economies can contribute to resolving the global crisis of anthropogenic climate change". He owns over 600 patents.

== See also ==
- Energy policy of China
- Renewable energy commercialization
- Solar power in China
