= Solar Valley =

Solar Valley may refer to:

- Solar Valley (China), industrial area in China
- Solar Valley (Germany), industrial area in Germany
- Trübbach a village in Switzerland

== See also ==
- Solar (disambiguation)
- Valley (disambiguation)
