= Shi Zhengrong =

Chinese-Australian businessman and philanthropist

Shi Zhengrong 施正荣
- 施正荣 (Shī Zhèngróng)
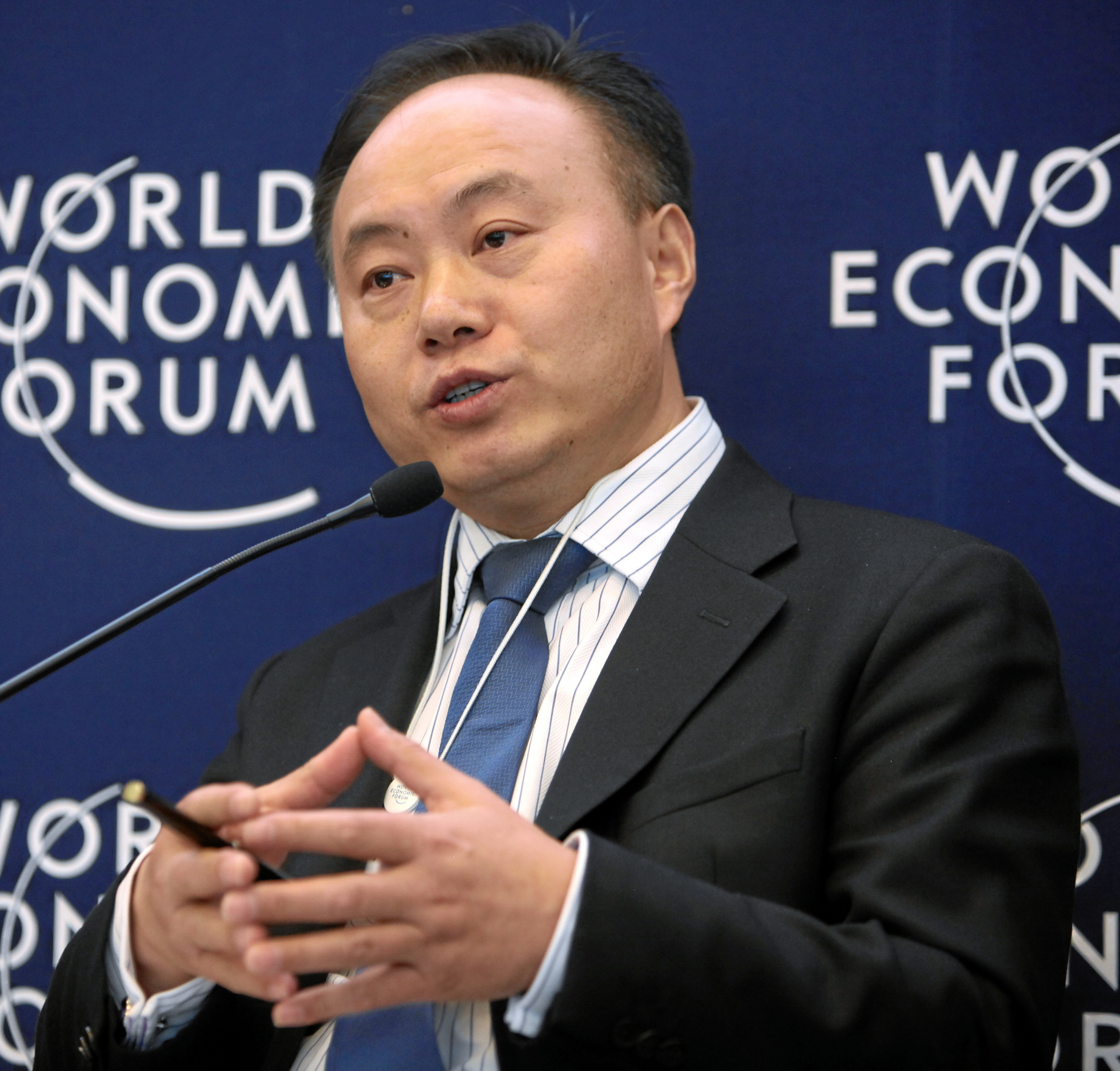
- Shi at the World Economic Forum annual meeting in 2012
- Born: Shi Zhengrong; 10 February 1963 (age 63); Yangzhong, Jiangsu, China
- Education: Changchun University of Science and Technology; Shanghai Institute of Optics and Fine Mechanics, Chinese Academy of Sciences; University of New South Wales
- Occupations: Founder, former chairman & CEO; Suntech Power
- Spouse: Zhang Wei
- Relatives: Chen Henglong (twin brother)

Shi Zhengrong (Chinese: 施正荣; pinyin: Shī Zhèngróng, born 10 February 1963) is a Chinese-Australian businessman and philanthropist. He is the founder and, up to March 2013, chairman and chief executive officer of Suntech Power.

== Biography ==
Shi was born in Yangzhong, Jiangsu, China. His identical twin brother is Chen Henglong, who is also a tycoon. He finished his undergraduate study at Changchun University of Science and Technology, and obtained his Master's degree from the Shanghai Institute of Optics and Fine Mechanics, Chinese Academy of Sciences. Afterward, Shi went to the University of New South Wales's School of Photovoltaic and Renewable Energy Engineering where he obtained his doctorate degree on solar power technology. Shi studied with Professor Martin Green.

He acquired Australian citizenship and returned to China in 2001 to set up the solar power company Suntech Power. Shi founded Suntech with support from the Wuxi city government, which held a 25% stake in the company.

After Suntech's listing on the New York Stock Exchange in 2005, Shi became the richest person in China. Academic Lan Xiaohuan writes that Shi's wealth following the listing "acted as a strong demonstration effect and local governments across China soon began to invest in the solar industry."

Shi was elected Fellow of the Australian Academy of Technological Sciences and Engineering in 2009. In 2009, Shi also received the Oslo Business for Peace Award, an award chosen by Nobel winners to leaders in the private sector who have demonstrated transformative and positive change through ethical business practices.

According to Hurun Report's China Rich List 2013, he had a personal net worth of US$330 million.

Amid fierce price competition on its products, on 20 March 2013, the Suntech board declared bankruptcy in the wake of defaulting on US$541 million-worth of bonds, Shi had been demoted from chairman to director earlier that month. The Financial Times, quoting the Shanghai Securities News, reported at the time that Shi's movements were being restricted and that he was not allowed to leave China pending an investigation into his role at Suntech. By 2016, he was living in Shanghai and frequently visiting Australia. As of 2017 and 2018, Dr. Shi Zhengrong had been seen actively giving key note speeches at solar conferences and promoting the use of solar technologies in both China and overseas.

== Philanthropy ==
He has donated funds to a renewable energy research unit at the University of NSW, Australia "because he felt it was not getting an appropriate level of government support", according to Australian Greens Senator Christine Milne.
