= UNSW Faculty of Engineering =

UNSW Engineering

- Established: 1950
- Dean: Professor Julien Epps
- Location: Sydney, New South Wales, Australia
- Website: www.eng.unsw.edu.au

The Faculty of Engineering is a constituent body of the University of New South Wales (UNSW), Australia. UNSW was formed on 1 July 1949, and the Faculty was established on 8 May 1950 with the inaugural meeting of the Faculty taking place on 7 June 1950. It was one of the first three University faculties which were established by Council (resolution 54), and was initially formed of four departments including Electrical Engineering, Mechanical Engineering, Civil Engineering and Mining Engineering, headed by Dean Professor Harold Brown.

Today, it is the largest engineering faculty in Australia, offering the widest range of engineering programmes.

== Organisations ==
The Faculty comprises eight schools:

- UNSW School of Biomedical Engineering
- UNSW School of Chemical Engineering
- UNSW School of Civil & Environmental Engineering
- UNSW School of Computer Science and Engineering
- UNSW School of Electrical Engineering and Telecommunications
- UNSW School of Mechanical and Manufacturing Engineering
- UNSW School of Minerals and Energy Resources Engineering
- UNSW School of Photovoltaic and Renewable Energy Engineering

The UNSW School of Surveying and Geospatial Engineering (1970 to 2013) was a school of this faculty.

=== Women in Engineering ===
Eleonora Kopalinsky, the first woman to graduate in engineering at UNSW, graduated with a Bachelor of Engineering in Mechanical Engineering in 1966. Other early female engineering graduates were:

- Lee Eng SIM. She came from Malaysia to Australia to do her leaving certificate at Sydney Girls' High, then enrolled as a full time electrical engineering student the next year.
- Zanir Zakir. She came from Sumatra in 1963 under the Columbo Plan. She graduated from the School of Mechanical Engineering.

== Rankings and achievements ==
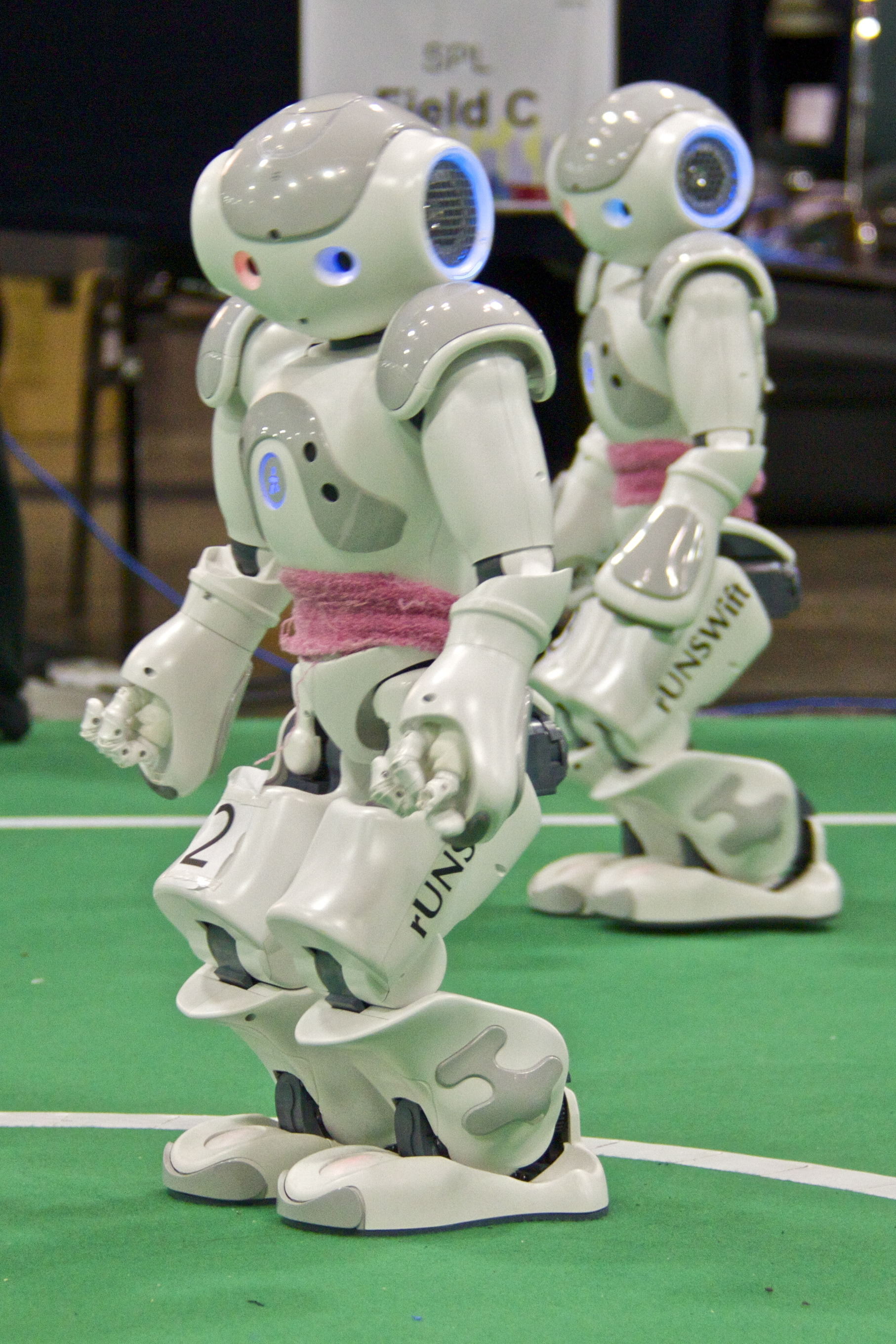
rUNSWift in a Standard Platform League game from RoboCup 2010 in Singapore.

- Ranked Number 1 Engineering faculty in Australia - ARWU, 2016; NTU Ranking, 2016
- Ranked Number 1 in Australia for Civil Engineering - ARWU, 2016; QS Rankings, 2017
- Ranked Number 1 in Australia for Electrical and Electronic Engineering - ARWU, 2016
- Ranked Number 1 in Australia for Mechanical Engineering - ARWU, 2016; NTU Ranking, 2016
- Ranked Number 1 in Australia for Energy Science & Engineering - ARWU, 2016
- Ranked Number 1 in Australia for Chemical Engineering - NTU Ranking, 2016
- Ranked Number 1 in Australia for Computer Science - THES, 2021, ARWU, 2016
- Ranked Number 1 in Australia for Materials Science and Engineering - ARWU, 2016
- The UNSW Centre for Photovoltaic Engineering currently holds the world record for single-crystalline silicon solar cell efficiency (25%). It also holds the world record for multi-layer solar cell efficiency (43%). It is one of the leading solar cell research centres in the world with ongoing active research in the area of wafer-based solar cell technologies, thin film cell technologies and advanced third-generation cell concepts.
- 23% of "Australia's Top 100 Most Influential Engineers" as listed by Engineers Australia graduated from UNSW, the highest percentage for any university.
- In the top 5 universities in Australia for the proportion of graduates who were employed full-time four months after completing their course - Quality Indicators for Learning and Teaching (QILT) Results

=== MyUniversity Results ===
MyUniversity is an Australian Government website providing information about Australian universities. As data is collected from different sources, percentages may collate to over 100%. Information is provided university wide, and on select disciplines. Results for all Engineering disciplines are listed below.

- Aerospace Engineering Students
  - 97.7% of students have a positive outcome:
    - 89.9% full-time job rate (highest amongst the Go8 and ATN universities in Australia)
    - 7.8% of students go onto further full-time study
  - 7.8% Attrition Rate (lowest amongst the Go8 and ATN universities in Australia)
- Computing and Information Systems
  - 100% of students have a positive outcome:
    - 93.5% full-time job rate (highest amongst the Go8 and ATN universities in Australia)
    - 7.8% of students go onto further full-time study
  - 8.6% Attrition Rate (lowest amongst the Go8 and ATN universities in Australia)
- Civil Engineering Students
  - 100% of students have a positive outcome:
    - 94.9% full-time job rate (highest amongst the Go8 and ATN universities in Australia)
    - 9.1% of students go onto further full-time study
  - 5.2% Attrition Rate (second lowest amongst the Go8 and ATN universities in Australia)
- Electrical and Electronic Engineering students
  - 100% of students have a positive outcome:
    - 92.4% full-time job rate (highest amongst the Go8 and ATN universities in Australia)
    - 10.6% of students go onto further full-time study
  - 5.0% Attrition Rate (lowest amongst the Go8 and ATN universities in Australia)
- Mechanical Engineering student
  - 100% of students have a positive outcome:
    - 90.1% full-time job rate (highest amongst the Go8 and ATN universities in Australia)
    - 13.1% of students go onto further full-time study
  - 6.7% Attrition Rate (second lowest amongst the Go8 and ATN universities in Australia)

== Projects ==
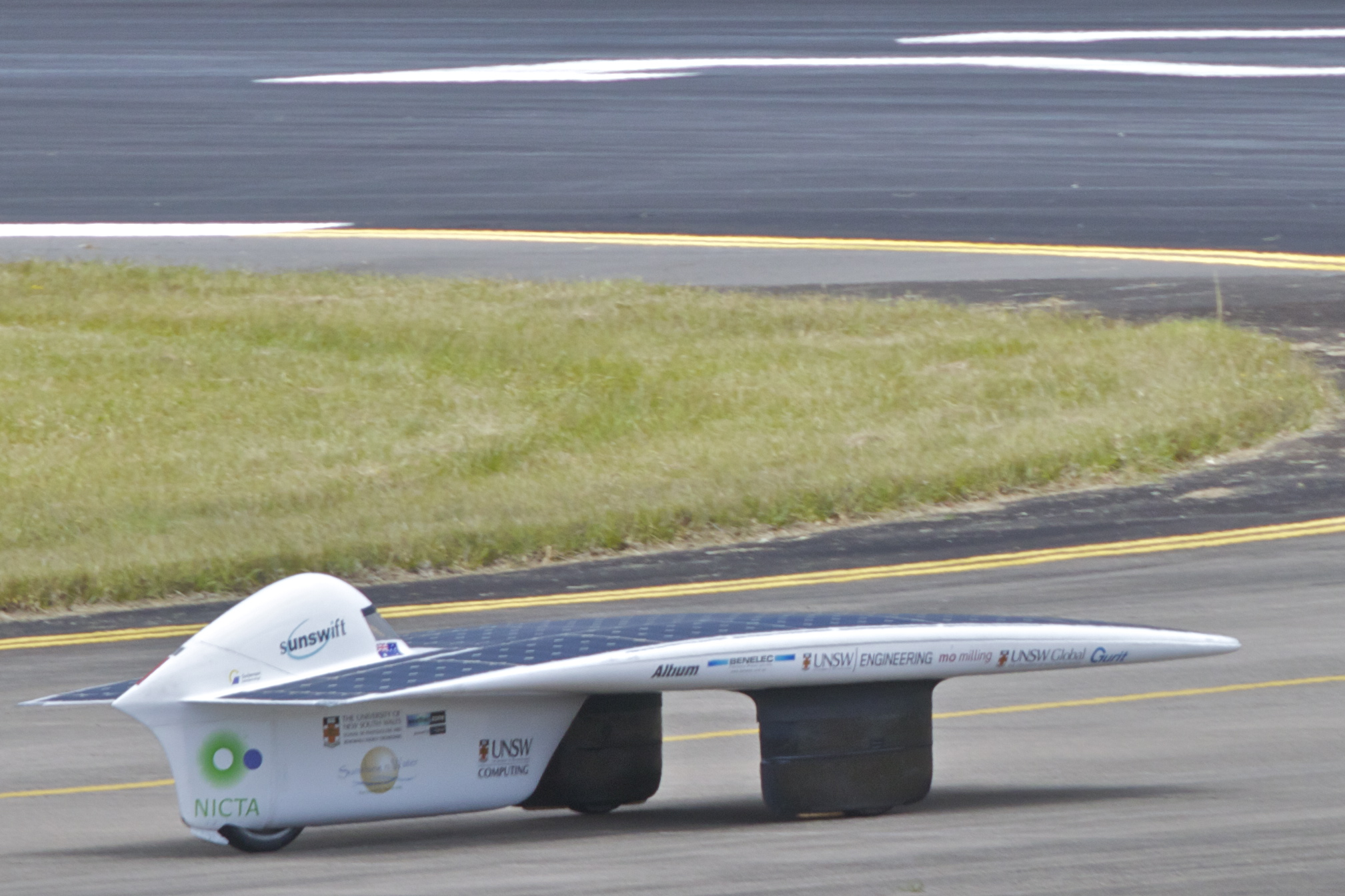
Sunswift IVy During the World Solar-Car Speed Record attempt.

Students of the faculty are involved in a number of high-profile projects:

- Sunswift Solar Car (officially the world's fastest solar-powered vehicle at 88 km/h, and winner of the Silicon Class of the 2009 Global Green Challenge).
- UNSW Redback Racing, Formula SAE-A racing car (National winners in 2000)
- BLUEsat Satellite (Development in Progress).
- UNSW Competitive Robotics Group (building award-winning autonomous vehicles).

== Notable alumni ==
- Ori Allon, Computer Science and Engineering PhD - Orion Search Engine (bought by Google); BRW Young Rich List 2013
- Rose Amal, Chemical Engineering - Director, ARC Centre of Excellence for Functional Nanomaterials, University of NSW; Engineers Australia "Top 100 Influential Engineers", 2013, 2014
- Robert Care (Civil Engineering) - Chair for UK, Middle East and Africa, Arup Group; Engineers Australia "Top 100 Influential Engineers, 2013"
- Greg Combet (Mining Engineering) - Former Federal Minister for Climate Change, Industry and Innovation; Engineers Australia "Top 100 Influential Engineers, 2013"

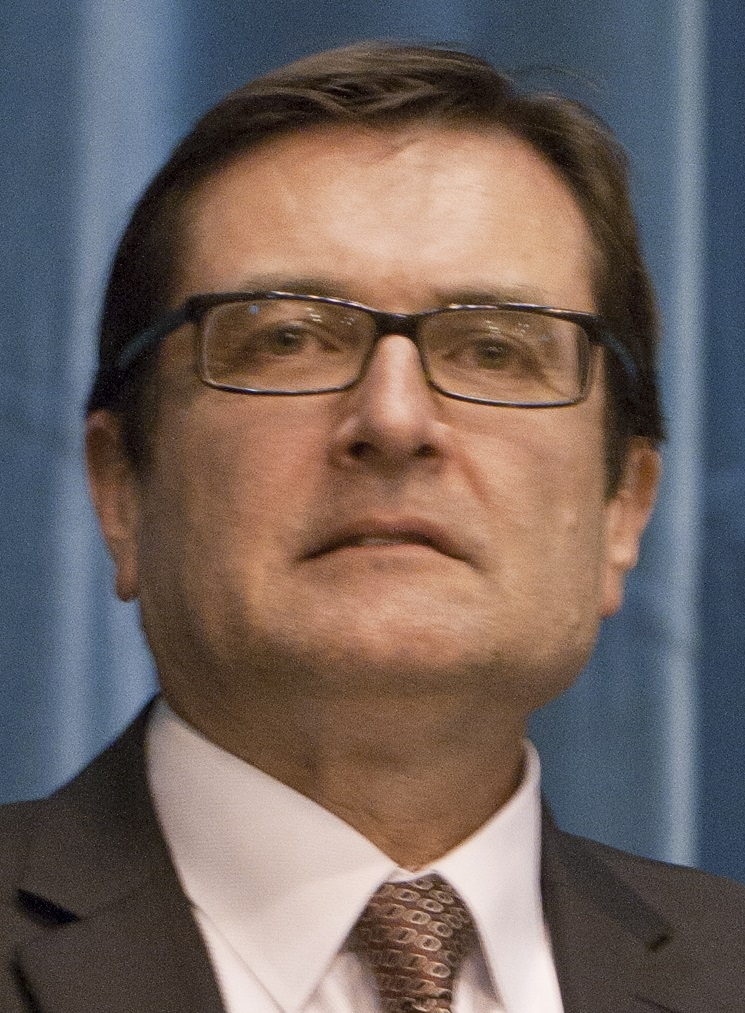
Greg Combet

- Bob Every (Metallurgist) - Chair, Wesfarmers; Engineers Australia "Top 100 Influential Engineers", 2013, 2014
- Mick Farrell (Chemical Engineering) - Chief Executive, ResMed; Engineers Australia "Top 100 Influential Engineers", 2013, 2014
- Mehreen Faruqi (MEngSc in Waste Management) - Greens MLC - NSW Parliament; Daily Life's 20 Women of the Year; Judy Raper Award for Leadership in Engineering
- Andrew Harding (Mining) - Chief Executive - Iron Ore, Rio Tinto, Perth; Engineers Australia "Top 100 Influential Engineers", 2014
- Philip Hercus (Naval Architecture) - Founder of International Catamaran Designs; Engineers Australia's AGM Michell Award for achievements in Engineering, 1992
- Chris Jenkins (Mechanical Engineering) - Managing Director, Thales Australia; Engineers Australia "Top 100 Influential Engineers", 2013, 2014
- Grant King (Civil Engineering) - Managing Director, Origin Energy; Engineers Australia "Top 100 Influential Engineers", 2013, 2014
- Warren King (Electrical Engineering) - CEO, Defence Material Organisation; Engineers Australia "Top 100 Influential Engineers", 2013, 2014
- Richard Leupen (Mechanical Engineering) - Managing Director and CEO, UGL; Engineers Australia "Top 100 Influential Engineers", 2013, 2014
- Peter McIntyre (Electrical Engineering) - Managing Director, TransGrid; Engineers Australia "Top 100 Influential Engineers", 2013, 2014
- Bruce Munro (Civil Engineering) - Managing Director, Thiess;
- Campbell Newman (Civil Engineering, ADFA) - Premier of Queensland;
- Daniel Lambert (Civil Engineering) - Sir John Holland Civil Engineer of the Year 2021;
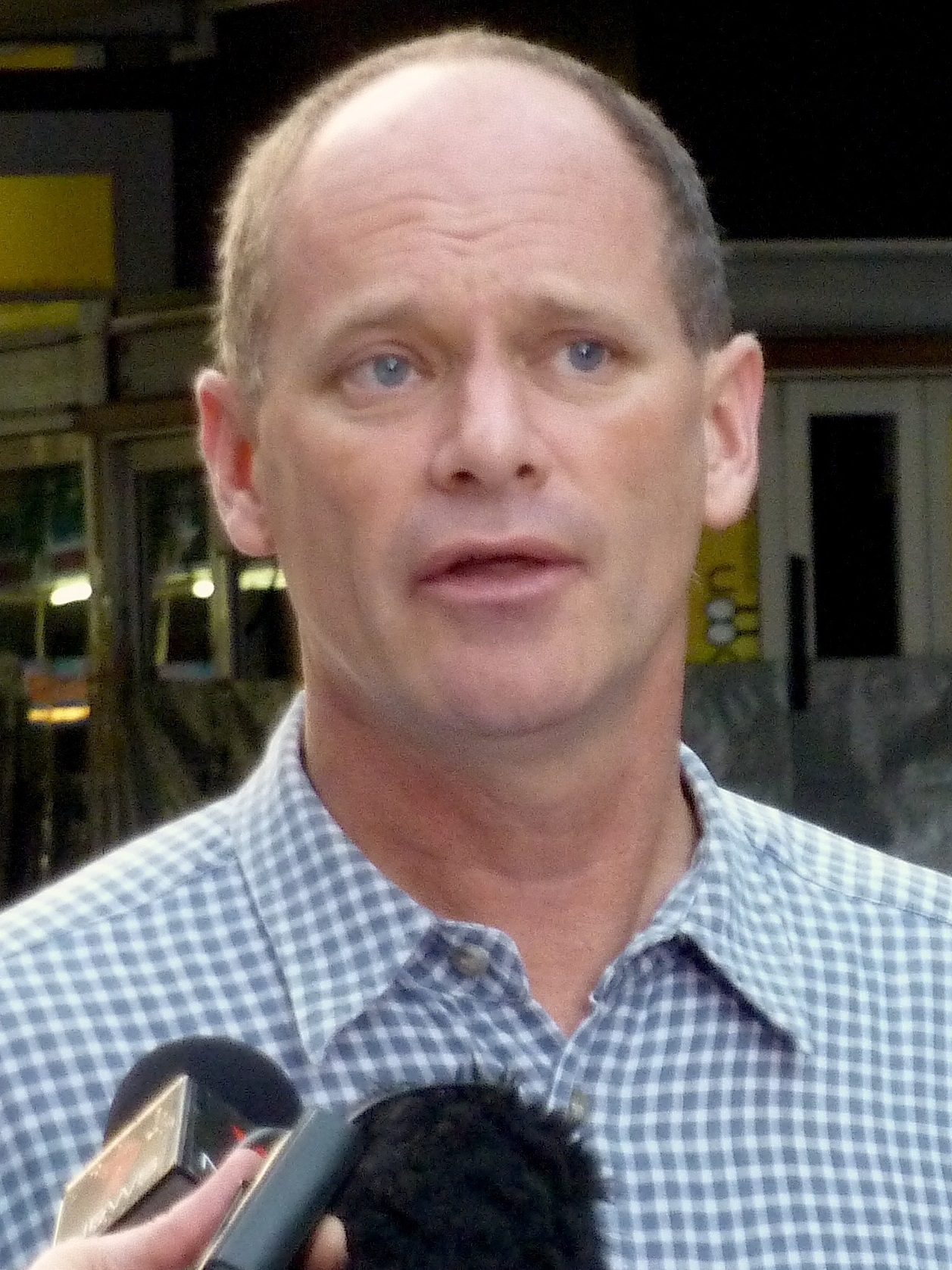
  Campbell Newman
- Mike Quigley (Electrical Engineering) - CEO, NBN Co;
- Chris Raine (Mechanical Engineering) - President and CEO, Alstom Australia and New Zealand;
- Judy Raper (Chemical Engineering) - Deputy Vice-Chancellor (Research), University of Wollongong;
- Chris Roberts (Chemical Engineering) - Chief Executive & President, Cochlear Limited;
- George Savvides (Industrial Engineering) - Managing Director, Medibank Private;
- Jamie Shelton (Structural Engineering) - National President, Consult Australia;
- Shi Zhengrong (Photovoltaic PhD) - Founder and CEO, Suntech

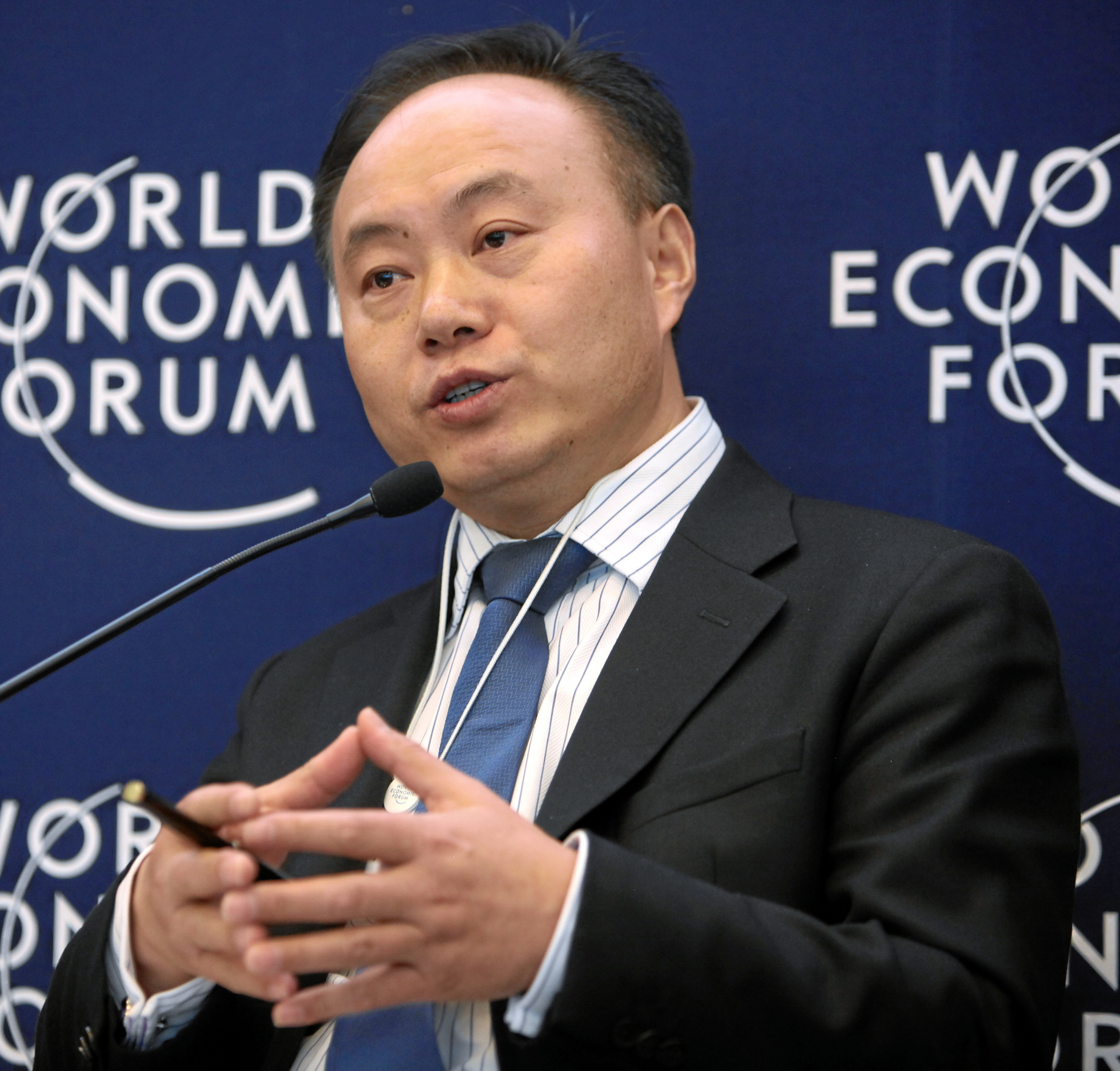
Shi Zhengrong

- Ian Smith (Mining Engineering) - Managing Director and CEO, Orica;
- Elizabeth Taylor (Civil Engineering) - Chair, RedR International;
- Guy Templeton (Electrical Engineering) - President & Chief Operating Officer Asia/Australia-Pacific/Southern Africa, WSP USA;
- Michael Uzzell (Electrical Engineering) - Head of Navy Engineering, Royal Australian Navy;
- Stuart Wenham (Photovoltaic Engineering) - Director, ARC Photovoltaics Centre of Excellence, University of NSW;
- Les Wielinga (Civil Engineering) - Director-General, Transport for NSW;
