= Suntech Power =

Chinese producer of solar panels

Suntech Power Holdings Co., Ltd.

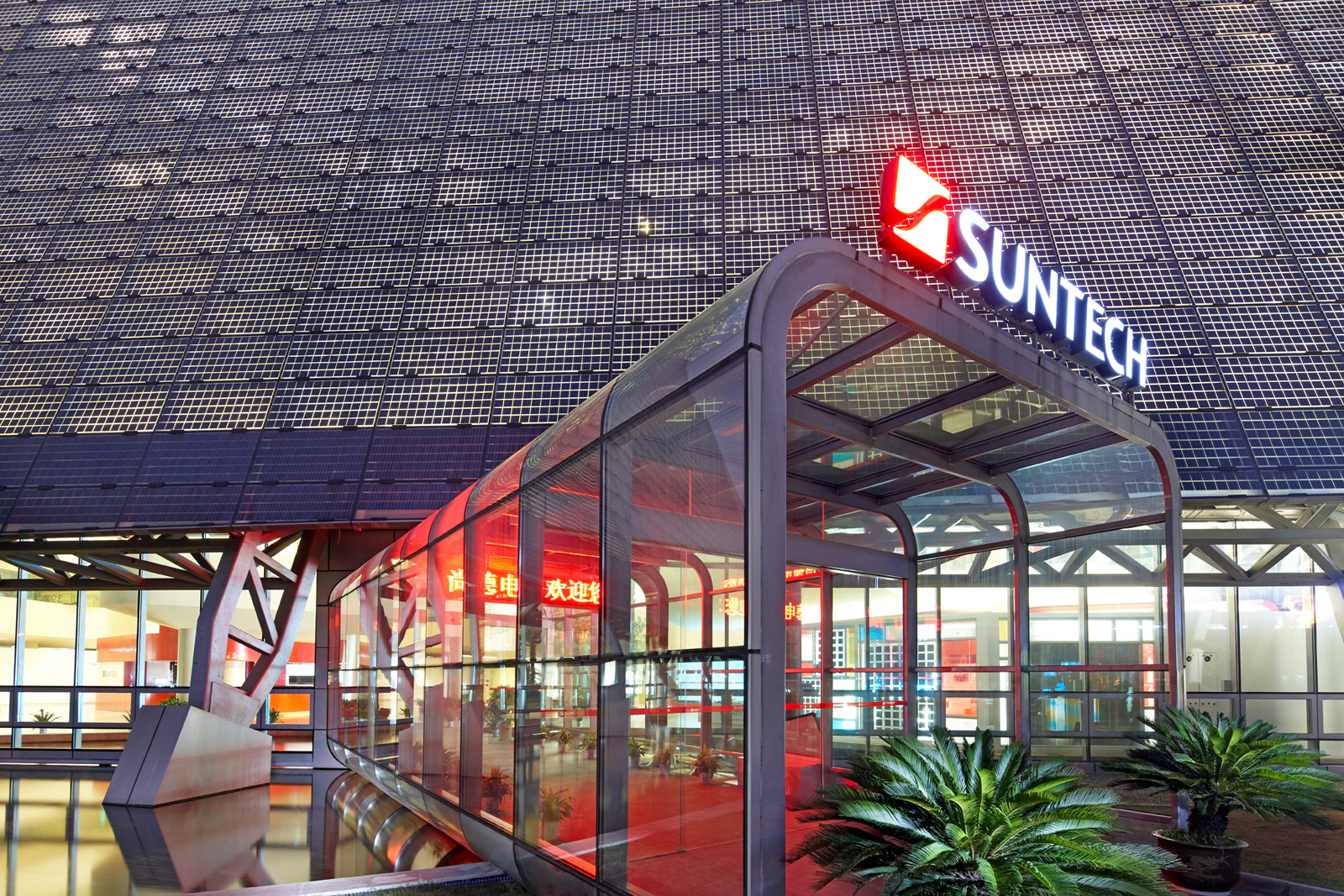
- Suntech Headquarters in Wuxi, 2010
- Native name: 尚德电力
- Type: Public
- Industry: Photovoltaics
- Founded: September 2001
- Founder: Shi Zhengrong
- Headquarters: Wuxi, Jiangsu, China
- Number of locations: United States, Germany, Switzerland, Japan, Australia, Italy, Spain
- Revenue: ▲US$3.15 Billion (FY 2011)
- Operating income: ▼ -US$616 Million (FY 2011)
- Net income: ▼ -US$1.00 Billion (FY 2011)
- Total assets: ▲US$2.09 Billion (FY 2011)
- Total equity: ▲US$946 Million (FY 2011)
- Parent: Shunfeng International Clean Energy Limited
- Website: www.suntech-power.com/

Suntech Power Holdings Co., Ltd. (Chinese: 尚德; pinyin: Shàngdé) is a Chinese producer of solar panels, with 2,000 MW (2,700,000 hp) of annual production capacity by the end of 2011. It is headquartered in Wuxi, Jiangsu. Shunfeng International Clean Energy Limited, a HKSE listed renewable energy investment and Independent Power Producer company, acquired Suntech in 2014 following Suntech's bankruptcy in 2013. With offices or production facilities in every major market, Suntech has delivered more than 13,000,000 solar panels to thousands of companies in more than 80 countries around the world. As the center for the company's global operations, Suntech headquarters, in Wuxi, China, features the world's largest building integrated solar facade.

Suntech's fortunes have declined significantly since its peak in 2008 due to a market glut in solar products and investment problems. In March 2013, the company announced a default on a US$541 million bond payment, becoming the first company from mainland China to default on its US bonds. Following the default, Chinese banks filed to place Suntech's main unit, Wuxi Suntech Power Holdings Co., Ltd., into insolvency. Subsequently, the company's American Depository Receipts were delisted from the New York Stock Exchange and moved to the over-the-counter (OTC) exchange.

== Founder ==
Dr Shi Zhengrong (born c. 1963) was the founder of Suntech Power and, until 2013, its chairman and chief executive officer.

He is a graduate of the University of New South Wales' (UNSW) School of Photovoltaic and Renewable Energy Engineering. At UNSW, Dr. Shi studied under Professor Martin Green and met Stuart Wenham, later to be Suntech's Chief Technology Officer.

In 2007, Dr. Shi was named one of Time Magazine's Heroes of the Environment and referred to as the world's first 'green billionaire'. Dr. Shi was honored in January 2010 as a finalist for the Zayed Future Energy Prize. Dr. Shi was also appointed Visiting Professor at UNSW.

== Global operations ==
Suntech Power has representative offices in China, Australia, the United States, Switzerland, Spain, Italy, Germany, Japan, and Dubai, as well as production facilities in Wuxi, Luoyang, Qinghai, Shanghai, Germany, Japan, and Goodyear, Arizona.

Suntech America was based in San Francisco, California, and had plans to start a production facility in Phoenix, Arizona in 2010. In 2009, Suntech had executives of their US operations in top posts in American solar panel industry groups.

== Installations ==
Suntech Power has supplied or installed solar modules for numerous solar power plants and systems around the world. Notable installations include:

- Clif Bar Headquarters
- The Wharf, home of the Sydney Theatre Company (Sydney, Australia)
- Alamosa Power Plant (Colorado, US)
- Arizona State University (Arizona, US)
- Beijing National Stadium (Beijing, China)
- Elecnor Power Plant (Trujillo, Spain)
- Masdar City Solar Farm (Abu Dhabi, UAE)
- Nellis Air Force Base (Nevada, US)
- Expo 2010 Shanghai (Shanghai, China)
- Ketura Sun (Kibbutz Ketura, Israel)

The company's Suntech Energy Solutions division completed Google's 1.6 MW solar installation in June 2007.

Suntech Power joined with Israeli company Solarit Doral to build a 50 kW rooftop project in the Israeli settlement of Katzrin in the Golan Heights, which was connected to the electricity grid in December 2008.

Suntech panels were used on the Ketura Sun field, the first commercial solar field in Israel. The field was developed by the Arava Power Company.

In 2010, Suntech topped the solar panel shipment with 1.49 GW shipment volume, according to PVinsights. Suntech targets to ship over 2 GW in 2011; however, free price fall for solar components in 2011 made this more difficult to achieve. During the downturn of solar panel price, Chinese companies showed their ability to compete in cost management.

On the very first day of the third quarter in 2011, SunTech announced that they would terminate their long-term wafer contract with MEMC by paying $120 million.

Market share of the top five Chinese solar companies ranked in 2011, which are Suntech, Yingli, Trina, Canadian and Jinko, made a huge advancement from 17.2% market share in 2009 to 30% market share in 2011. The five Chinese solar module companies almost doubled their totaling market share in 2.5 years and took nearly one-third of the worldwide market.

== Awards ==
Suntech Power was recognized as the 2008 Frost & Sullivan Solar Energy Development Company of the Year. Frost & Sullivan Research Analyst Mary John commented on the recognition, "The company's pioneering success in developing energy-efficient, cost-effective and customizable building integrated photovoltaic (BIPV) systems and crystalline PV cells, and modules for solar energy conversion into electricity are highly commendable. It has gone beyond just meeting global energy needs to anticipating them as well and highly satisfied customers testify that the BIPV systems and other energy-efficient products are customized precisely to their needs."

The Andalay AC Solar PV Panel was awarded one on MSN's most brilliant products of 2009 because of innovations that advanced their ease of installation and use. Suntech Power is one of the main manufacturers of components for the Andalay Solar Panel sold by Akeena Solar (AKNS). Akeena Solar granted a subsequent license to Suntech to distribute Andalay in Europe, Japan and Australia.

== Financial activities ==
Shi founded Suntech with support from the Wuxi city government, which held a 25% stake in the company. Three local government financing vehicles and five local state-owned enterprises also invested in the company. Private and foreign investors purchased all of Suntech's previously state-held shares prior to the company's offering on the NYSE in 2005.

At the time of that offering, Suntech was funded by a consortium of private equity firms, including Actis Capital and Goldman Sachs. The consolidated private equity investment into Suntech is generally considered to be one of China's most profitable private equity investments ever, as each firm is thought to have made gains well over 10x on their original investments. The company's stock performed quite well after its first day of IPO on December 14, 2005.

After Suntech's NYSE listing, Shi became the richest person in China. Academic Lan Xiaohuan writes that Shi's wealth following the listing "acted as a strong demonstration effect and local governments across China soon began to invest in the solar industry."

GSF became biggest partner of Suntech and in 2010, almost all the international sales were through GSF. In June 2008, Suntech invested into their biggest partner, Global Solar Fund (GSF), a company investing in power plants in Spain and Italy. In May 2010, Suntech guaranteed a finance arrangement of €554.2 million provided by China Development Bank to companies related to GSF, using €560 million in German government bonds from GSF Capital as collateral. There was no issue related with transparency and GSF was wrongly blamed for failure of Suntech (evident from Earnings call, Chairman comments). However, on 30 July 2012 Suntech revealed that the bonds didn't exist, they were apparently forgeries. In the following week, Suntech shares lost 40% of their value.

== Decline ==
Suntech announced in 2013 that it will be closing its Goodyear, Arizona, panel manufacturing plant. The reason given for the closure was the hefty tariffs imposed on Chinese solar cells by the United States International Trade Commission. Though the panels were assembled in Arizona, the cells were produced in China.

== Bankruptcy ==
In 2013 the solar industry faced over capacity.

Suntech, defaulted on $541 million of convertible bonds in March 2013. On March 20, 2013, the main subsidiary of Suntech filed for bankruptcy in Jiangsu, China. In February 2014, Suntech filed for Chapter 15 bankruptcy in Manhattan, New York, to seek protection from U.S. creditors. A creditors' working group led by distressed debt funds Clearwater Capital Partners LLC and Spinnaker Capital Ltd. announced in August a plan to recapitalize the solar maker, the company said in a statement.

== See also ==
- Solar power in China
