= Qinghai Golmud Solar Park =

Photovoltaic power station Qinghai, China

- Country: China
- Location: Golmud, Qinghai Province
- Coordinates: 36°20′16″N 95°13′18″E
- Status: Operational
- Construction began: July 2011
- Commission date: December 2011
- Owner: Longyuan Power

Solar farm
- Type: Flat-panel PV

Power generation
- Units operational: 32,338 poly-Si 230W; 47,630 poly-Si 235W; 33,264 a-Si 46W
- Nameplate capacity: 20.16 MW
- Annual net output: 33.4 GWh

Qinghai Golmud Solar Park (Chinese: 格尔木太阳能光伏电站) is a photovoltaic power station located in Golmud, Qinghai Province, China. It is 20.16 megawatt-peak (MWp), completed in 2011 by Longyuan Power. It uses 18.63079 MW of polycrystalline silicon solar cell modules and 1.530144 MW of amorphous silicon thin film modules. The polysilicon modules are by Yingli, and the amorphous ones are from Golden Sun Solar (GS-Solar). The capacity factor is expected to be 0.189.

There are a total of 570 MW of solar parks in Golmud, among them the 20 MW Astronergy Golmud Solar Park, completed in 2011, with 500 MW more expected in 2012.

== See also ==
- Golmud Solar Park
- Solar power in China
- List of photovoltaic power stations
- Photovoltaic power station
