= UNSW School of Surveying and Geospatial Engineering =

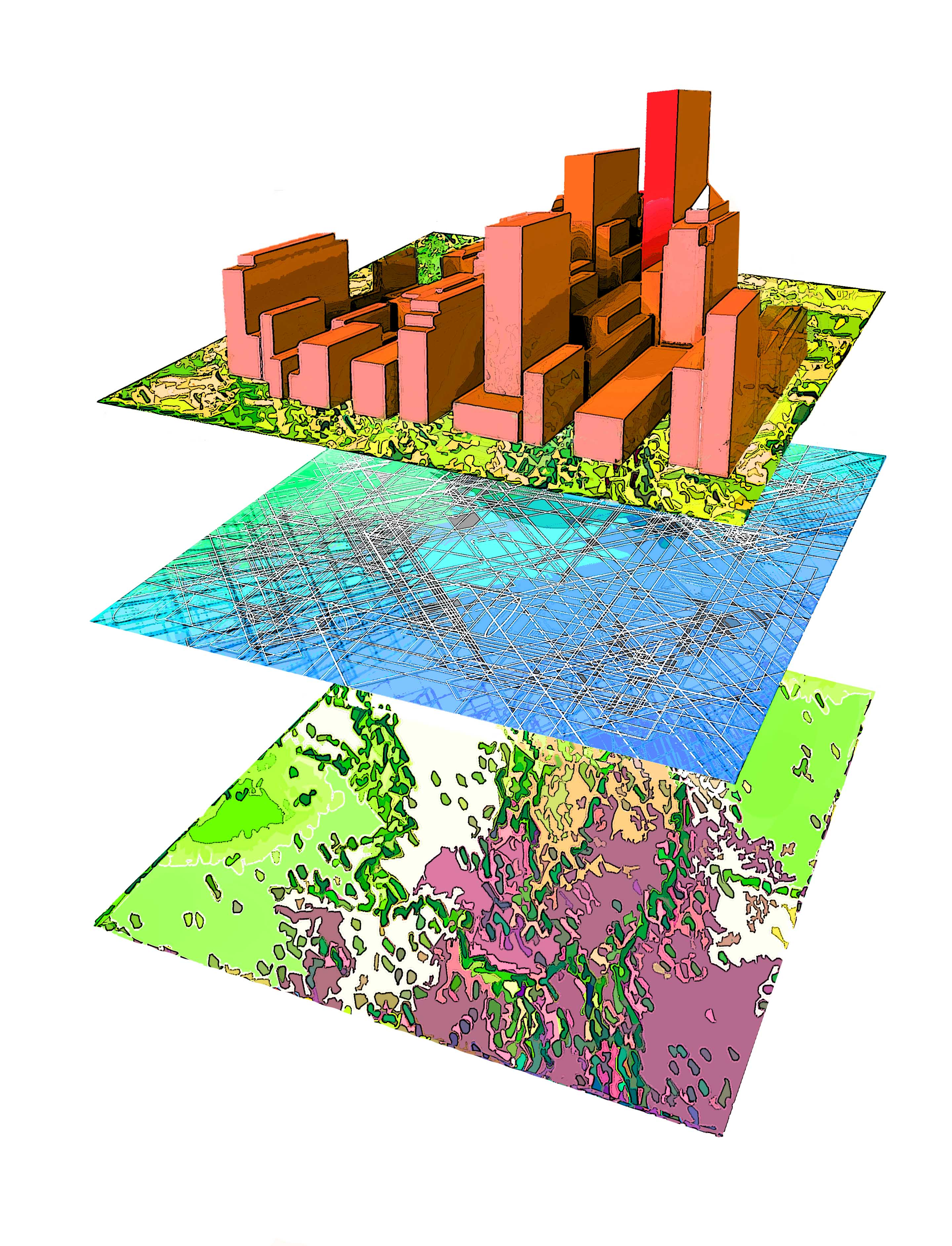
Design Di Quick, work done within the School

The UNSW School of Surveying and Geospatial Engineering (SAGE), part of the UNSW Faculty of Engineering, was founded in 1970 and disestablished in 2013.

The School has undergraduate and postgraduate programs in Surveying and in GeoInformation Systems (GIS). The Bachelor of Engineering (Surveying) is recognised by the Surveying & Spatial Sciences Institute (SSSI) as a pathway to becoming a registered surveyor, and both undergraduate degrees are accredited by Engineers Australia.

The School has strong research activity in wireless, ground-based and satellite-based positioning technology, being Australia's largest academic research concentration in these areas. While the main research focus is Global Navigation Satellite Systems (GNSS) such as GPS, the School also conducts research under the broad banner of ‘Navigation and Earth Observation’ including in surveying, geodesy, inertial navigation systems, pseudolites, mobilephone positioning, integrated navigation and imaging systems, and radar remote sensing.

The School has research and teaching links with institutions in North America, Europe and Asia, and School staff hold (or have held) leadership positions in international and national scientific and professional bodies such as the International Association of Geodesy, the International Society for Photogrammetry & Remote Sensing, the International GNSS Service, Multi-GNSS Asia, Surveying & Spatial Science Institute, the NSW Institution of Surveyors, and others.

== History ==
The first independent undergraduate degree in surveying was established in 1957 in the UNSW School of Civil Engineering. Significant growth in the field led in 1970 to the establishment of an independent School of Surveying under founding Professor Peter Angus-Leppan.

In 1975, the School was divided into three departments, Geodesy, Photogrammetry, and Surveying, to take account of emerging technologies deriving from developments in electronics and space science, including satellite technology for geopositioning and remote sensing. A major Image Analysis Laboratory was installed in 1977 and the Centre for Remote Sensing (later known as the Centre for Remote Sensing and Geographic Information Systems (GIS)) was established in 1982, jointly with the UNSW Schools of Geography and Electrical Engineering.

From 1983 to 1992, a number of the School's academics were engaged in the Thailand Land Titling Project. Funded by the Australian and Royal Thai Governments and the World Bank, this project worked to entirely remap Thailand and reform its land titling system in order to reduce poverty, overcome regional income disparities and promote economic growth. This project won The World Bank Group's Excellence Award in 1997.

In 1978, the launch of the first GPS satellite saw a revolution in the way position is measured. GPS research commenced at the School in 1984 and in the early 1990s, under Professor Chris Rizos, all GPS-related research was organised under the Satellite Navigation and Positioning (SNAP) group and was expanded to encompass other navigation technologies and applications.

In 1994 the School changed its name to the School of Geomatic Engineering to reflect its expansion of education and research beyond those of traditional surveying, to include remote sensing, geographic information analysis, image processing and satellite positioning. The name was never fully accepted within the NSW surveying profession, however, and there was a second name change in 2001 to Surveying and Spatial Information Systems.

In 2010, two separate undergraduate degrees were launched, a Bachelor of Engineering (GeoInformation Systems) and a Bachelor of Engineering (Surveying).

In 2012 the School was renamed the School of Surveying and Geospatial Engineering.

== Research ==
Since the 1960s, the School has focused on geodesy research. Other past research areas have included photogrammetry, remote sensing, network adjustments, industrial metrology and cadastral systems.

From 1984, the School made important contributions to the development of high accuracy (centimetre-level) positioning algorithms suitable for surveying and geodesy applications. In the early 1990s, all GPS-related research was organised under the Satellite Navigation and Positioning (SNAP) group. From 2004, this also included other wireless and inertial positioning technologies, and space techniques such as Interferometric Synthetic Aperture Radar (InSAR). The School's research areas have extended to GNSS research, aspects of signal processing for the design of GNSS receivers, integrated navigation systems, new designs for terrestrial-based navigation systems and a variety of positioning/navigation applications.

The School has Australia's strongest academic research group working in the areas of positioning/navigation and satellite radar remote sensing, with research strengths in Navigation and Earth Observation. This combines all the technologies and applications dealing with GNSS, inertial and wireless positioning systems, with ‘metric’ (involving precise geometry-based measurements) remote sensing techniques such as InSAR, aerial and satellite digital imagery, LiDAR and terrestrial laser scanning, and modern geodesy.

Navigation research includes GPS/GNSS receiver design, data and signal processing algorithms, inertial navigation technologies and data fusion algorithms, other wireless positioning systems including those based on telecommunications (mobile telephony, WiFi, BlueTooth, RFID, vehicle-to-vehicle) as well as dedicated systems such as Locata Corporation, and their optimal integration to support a range of applications from farm and mining machinery automation and robotics, to precise navigation, georeferencing mapping and imaging systems (terrestrial, airborne, or spaceborne), and personal navigation.

The School's Earth Observation research refers to a subset of remote sensing technologies traditionally linked to geodesy, photogrammetry and surveying. These include InSAR satellite radar remote sensing; digital photogrammetry using terrestrial, aerial or satellite cameras; airborne and terrestrial laser scanning; and geodesy.

This Navigation and Earth Observation research is organised across broad research themes

- CORS Network Operations & High-Accuracy GNSS Algorithms
- Radar Remote Sensing & Engineering Deformation Monitoring
- Multi-Sensor Integration Algorithms & Applications
- New Positioning Technologies & Applications
- GNSS Receiver Design & Signal Processing

Research activities and unique strengths include:

- GPS algorithms for precise positioning over long baselines, real-time carrier phase-based positioning, and network-based CORS (Continuously Operating Reference Station) designs (e.g. initiating the establishment of SydNet, from which today's CORSnet-NSW has evolved).
- Development of the ‘Namuru’, a fully functional GNSS receiver that is the basis of research into future GNSS both within Australia and overseas. In 2010 the Namuru was flown on a sounding rocket by the German Space Agency.
- Signal processing expertise for multipath analysis, RF interference detection and self-interference mitigation, signal strength measurement, and structural deformation monitoring.
- Largest number of student prize winners at the annual US Institute of Navigation's GNSS symposium – second only to the Dept of Geomatics, University of Calgary (Canada),
- Operating Australia's only permanent Galileo tracking receiver as part of a global network, as well as a GNSS station in the CORSnet-NSW.
- Assisting Australian company Locata with research on their groundbreaking alternative technologies to replicate GNSS performance indoors and in situations where GNSS signals fail.
- Expertise in SAR-DEM generation, emergency flood mapping, and ground deformation monitoring using differential InSAR.
- Research into LiDAR wave form analysis, DEM generation, and biomass estimation.
- Addressing the requirements for indoor, UAV and vehicle-to-vehicle positioning, by conducting research into the use of a variety of technologies, on their own or in multi-sensor integrated systems – including mobile phone signals, WiFi, assisted-GNSS, vision and inertial sensors.

In July 2010, the Australian Government's Australian Space Research Program granted $4.6M for the SAR Formation Flying project – led by the School in a consortium of university and private sector partners and worth more than $9.6M with in-kind contributions. And in November 2010 UNSW opened the Australian Centre for Space Engineering, in which the School is a major contributor.

== Rankings ==
- Australia's largest Engineering Faculty.
- Top performing Engineering discipline among Australian universities.
- Top score in Engineering, Computing, Science and Architecture. UNSW also achieved the top score for excellence in Business, Law and Economics and the top overall scores for both excellence and improvement.
- Most cited Australian university in Engineering and Computer Science, as well as Maths, and Psychology.
- UNSW received Australia's highest ranking in ‘Geomatic Engineering’ (the research code under which most of the School's research is published) in the 2010 ERA assessment.
