= Ketura Sun =

Israel's first commercial solar field

Coordinates: 29.964685°N 35.059385°E

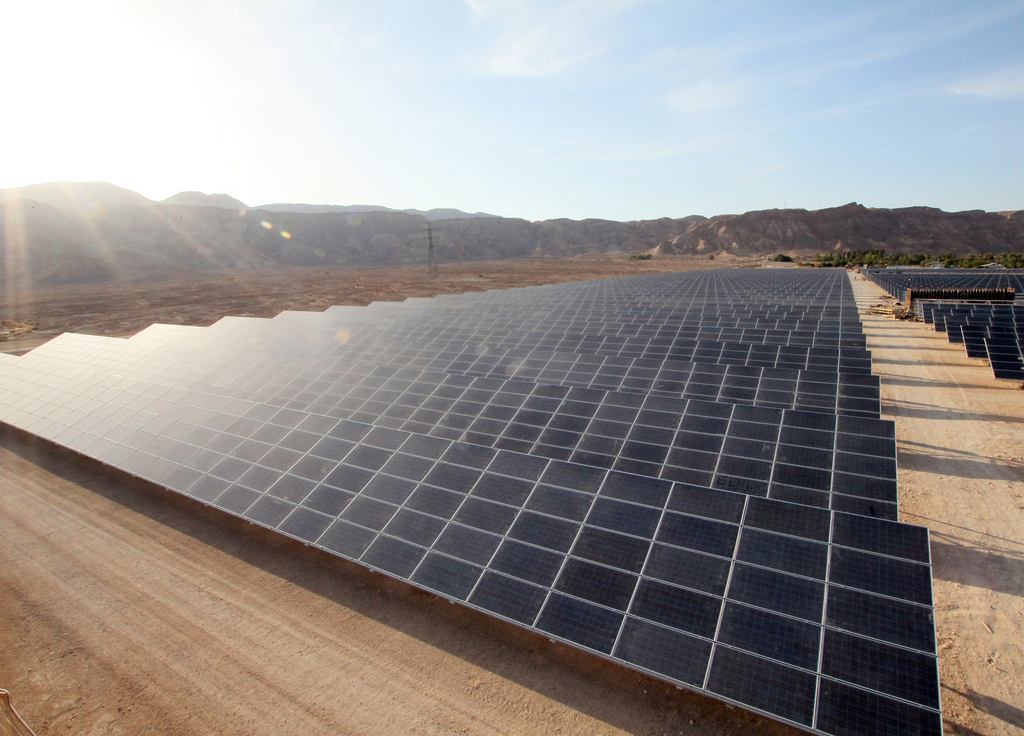
Israel's first commercial solar field, Ketura Sun.

Ketura Sun is Israel’s first commercial solar field. Built in early 2011 by Arava Power Company on Kibbutz Ketura, it covers 20 acres (8.09 hectares) and is expected to produce to 4.95 megawatts. It has the first automatic solar panel cleaning system in the world.

== Characteristics ==
The field consists of 18,500 photovoltaic panels made by Suntech, which will produce about nine million kilowatt-hours of electricity per year. In the next twenty years, the field will spare the production of some 125,000 metric tons of carbon dioxide. The field is connected to Israel’s national power grid and sends electricity to the 33,000 volt line to kibbutzim in the area.

Ketura Sun features the world's first fully automated solar panel cleaning system.

== See also ==
- Energy in Israel
