= Huanghe Hydropower Golmud Solar Park =

Photovoltaic power station in Qinghai, China

Golmud Solar Park
- Country: China
- Location: Golmud, Qinghai Province
- Coordinates: 36°24′00″N 95°07′30″E
- Status: Operational
- Construction began: 20 August 2009
- Commission date: 29 October 2011
- Construction cost: RMB3.26 billion
- Owner: Huanghe Hydropower

Solar farm
- Type: Flat-panel PV
- Site area: 564 hectares (1,390 acres)

Power generation
- Nameplate capacity: 200 MW_{p}
- Annual net output: 317 GWh

Huanghe Hydropower's Golmud Solar park is a 200 megawatt (MW) photovoltaic power station located in Golmud, Qinghai Province, China. Construction began in August 2009, and it was commissioned on October 29, 2011. 80 MW was provided by Yingli. The project won the 2012 China Quality Power Project Award. Output is expected to be 317 GWh per year.

Also in Golmud is the 20 MW Qinghai Golmud Solar Park completed in 2011 by Longyuan Power, as well as others. There are a total of 570 MW of solar parks in Golmud, many of which are located in the Golmud Desert Cluster, with 500 MW more expected in 2012.^{[update needed]}

== See also ==
- Solar power in China
- Qinghai Golmud Solar Park
- Photovoltaic power station
