= Arava Power Company =

Israeli solar energy company

- Industry: Solar fields
- Founded: 2006
- Founder: David Rosenblatt, Ketura through Ed Hofland, Yosef Abramowitz (active until 2010)
- Headquarters: Arava, Negev, Ketura, Israel
- Website: www.aravapower.com

Arava Power Company (APC) Arava Power is a utility-scale renewables Developer-IPP that pioneered Israeli utility-scale PV market. The company founded in 2006 on Ketura in the Arava Valley. On June 5, 2011, APC inaugurated Israel's first medium-sized solar field, Ketura Sun. The field stretches over 80 dunams (8 hectares or 20 acres) of land and has an installed power of 4.95MW. As Arava Power installs solar fields only on land zoned solely for agricultural or industrial use.

In the Ketura Sun project, photovoltaic (PV) solar panel from Suntech company were used, in collaboration with Siemens Israel. Arava's mission is to supply Israel with 10% of its energy needs through clean, renewable solar energy.

== History ==
Arava Power Company began as a partnership with Kibbutz Ketura. Israel's first Prime Minister, David Ben Gurion, was an inspiring figure for the vision of the company. In 1956, Ben Gurion said: "The largest and most impressive source of energy in our world and the source of life for every plant and animal, yet a source so little used by mankind today is the sun... Solar energy will continue to flow toward us almost indefinitely."

In August 2008, Siemens Project Ventures invested $15 Million in the Arava Power Company.

In November 2010, the Minister of National Infrastructure, Uzi Landau, signed a landmark Power Purchase Agreement with Ketura Sun Company, a joint venture between Kibbutz Ketura and Arava worth an estimated 250 Million NIS. The agreement is valid for twenty years and guarantees that the energy produced at Ketura Sun will be transferred to the Israel Electric Corporation's power lines. It is the first PPA in Israel with a solar energy company.

In December 2010, Bank Hapoalim signed an agreement with Arava Power to extend a loan of 80 Million NIS to APC in order to fund the Ketura Sun project (valued at ~100 Million NIS).

On June 5, 2011, APC inaugurated Israel's first solar field, Ketura Sun.

On May 22, 2012 Arava Power announced that it had reached financial close on an additional 58.5 MW for 8 projects to be built in the Arava and the Negev valued at 780 Million NIS or approximately $204 Million.

== See also ==
- Solar power in Israel
