= Solar Valley (China) =

- City
- Country: China
- Province: Shandong
- City: Dezhou
- Start: 2007
- Founder: Huang Ming, Himin Solar Energy Group

Area
  - Total: 3 km^{2} (1.2 sq mi)
- Time zone: UTC+8 (東八區)
- Website: www.chinasolarvalley.com

China's Solar Valley (Chinese: 中国太阳谷) located in Dezhou, Shandong province, China, is pilot project of the so-called future city template, that feature the full application of solar and clean energy technologies.

== Green city template ==
The Solar Valley has been described as "a massive exercise in social, economic and ecological engineering" using solar power in China. It is planned to cost $740 million USD, which includes $10 million to install solar lighting along roadways. The concept pursues the goal of low carbon mitigation through the application of solar-based low-carbon and microemission technologies in transportation, building capacities, and entertainment areas. Solar Valley occupies more than 330 hectares of land, which is intended to host a 60,000 square-meter solar floor area that can produce enough energy to power not just the valley, but also the entire mid-size city like Dezhou.

The project, which began in 2004, is led by Himin Solar Energy Group, the world's largest solar water heater manufacturer. It is being undertaken in line with China's renewable energy policy in partnership with the Dezhou local government.

== Etymology ==
Solar Valley is named after Silicon Valley.

== See also ==
- Renewable energy commercialization
- Solar energy in China
- Renewable energy in China (Wind, Solar, and Geothermal)
- Economic and Technological Development Zones

- Suzhou Industrial Park
- Dalian Software Park
- Zhangjiang Hi-Tech Park
