= Solar power in China =

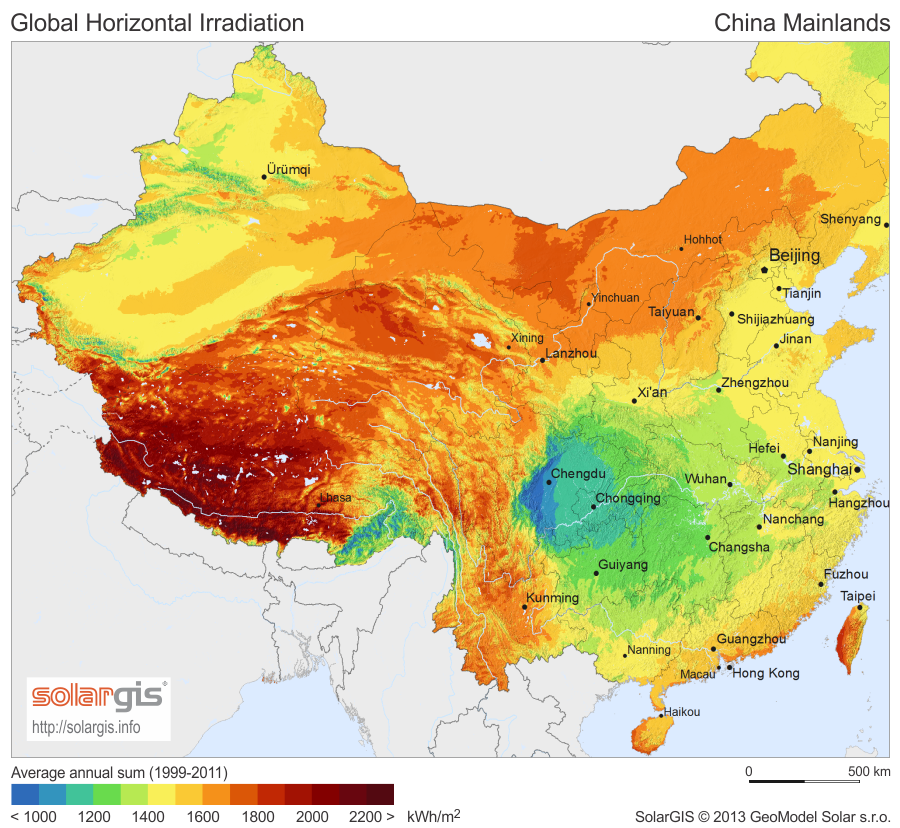
China's solar potential

Wind and solar surpassed a quarter of China's electricity generation for the first time in April 2025.

View chart definition.
Cumulative installed PV capacity in gigawatts since 2007

China is the largest market in the world for both photovoltaics (PV) and solar thermal energy. Its PV capacity crossed 1,000 gigawatts (one terawatt, 1 TW) in May 2025. By June 2025, China's PV capacity surpassed 1,100 gigawatt. In 2024, China added 277 gigawatts (GW) of solar power, which was equivalent to 15% of the world's total cumulative installed solar capacity.

China's photovoltaic industry began by making panels for satellites, and transitioned to the manufacture of domestic panels in the late 1990s. After substantial government incentives were introduced in 2011, China's solar power market grew dramatically: the country became the world's leading installer of photovoltaics in 2013. China surpassed Germany as the world's largest producer of photovoltaic energy in 2015, and became the first country to have over 100 GW of total installed photovoltaic capacity in 2017. As of at least 2024, Chinese firms are the industry leaders in almost all of the key parts of the solar industry supply chain, including polysilicon, silicon wafers, batteries, and photovoltaic modules.

As of at least 2024, China has one third of the world's installed solar panel capacity. Most of China's solar power is generated within its western provinces and is transferred to other regions of the country. In 2011, China owned the largest solar power plant in the world at the time, the Huanghe Hydropower Golmud Solar Park, which had a photovoltaic capacity of 200 MW. In 2018, it held the record again with the Tengger Desert Solar Park with its photovoltaic capacity of 1.5 GW. China currently owns the second-largest solar plant in the world, the Huanghe Hydropower Hainan Solar Park, which has a capacity of 2.2 GW. In 2023, China completed the world's largest hydro-solar power plant in Sichuan, which uses the consistency in hydropower production to offset the variability in solar power.

Solar power contributed a small portion of China's total energy use in 2020, accounting for 3.5% of China's total energy capacity. Paramount leader Xi Jinping announced at the 2020 Climate Ambition Summit that China plannned to have 1,200 GW of combined solar and wind energy capacity by 2030. This target was reached in 2024, six years ahead of the 2030 goal. As of at least 2023, solar power is cheaper than coal-fired power in China.

Solar water heating is also extensively implemented, with a total installed capacity of 290 GWth at the end of 2014, representing about 70% of world's total installed solar thermal capacity.

The expansion of the solar sector in China has been criticized due to the large quantities of waste being produced and improperly disposed of from the production of photovoltaic cells. Criticism over large amounts of unused energy being produced has appeared along with criticism over the forced removal of native populations for development land and the usage of forced labor in the production of photovoltaic cells.

Although in some countries there are aesthetic objections to large-scale solar farms, in China they are often perceived as an aesthetic positive due to their associations with modernity and green development.

== History ==
Photovoltaic research in China began in 1958 with the development of China's first piece of monocrystalline silicon. Research continued with the development of solar cells for space satellites in 1968. The Institute of Semiconductors of the Chinese Academy of Sciences led this research for a year, stopping after batteries failed to operate. Other research institutions continued the development and research of solar cells for Dongfanghong satellites. In 1975, domestic solar cell production began with factories in Ningbo and Kaifeng. These cells were produced in a similar fashion to the satellite cells of the past. Annual solar capacity installations were still low, as only 0.5 kW of photovoltaic capacity was installed. This increased to 8 kW in 1980, 70 kW in 1985, 500 kW in 1990, and 1550 kW in 1995.

China's Sixth Five-Year Plan (1981-1985) was the first to address government policy support for solar PV panel manufacturing. Policy support for solar panel manufacturing has been a part of every Five-Year Plan since.

In the early 1990s, Tsinghua University scientists developed a new type of evacuated tube solar water heater design. These units became ubiquitous in rural China during the early 2000s. By 2014, China had more than 85 million solar water heaters, primarily operating in rural households.

In 1998, demonstration projects for solar energy production began to appear, starting with a 3W polysilicon battery and applications for the energy. Yingli became one of the first producers of this new solar energy. However, annual capacity did not increase much until 2002 when a 10 MW solar cell production line was put into operation by Suntech Power. That year, a program aimed to install more solar and wind energy in Tibet, Xinjiang, Qinghai, Gansu, Inner Mongolia, Shanxi, and Sichuan was introduced by the National Development and Planning Commission. This spurred solar cell production and annual installations skyrocketed from 3.3 MW in 2000 to 20.3 MW in 2002. Photovoltaic cell production expanded in the following years, with 140 MW manufactured in 2005. Only 5 MW of solar energy was installed in China that year, however, as most of the manufactured photovoltaic cells were sold to European countries, with Germany being the largest buyer. China's annual solar energy installations grew to 10 MW installed in 2006, increasing China's total installed solar energy capacity to 80 MW. Annual solar energy installations continued to grow, with 20 MW of capacity installed in 2007 and 40 MW installed in 2008.

After Suntech's listing on the New York Stock Exchange in 2005, founder Shi Zhengrong became the richest person in China. Academic Lan Xiaohuan writes that Shi's wealth following the listing "acted as a strong demonstration effect and local governments across China soon began to invest in the solar industry."

In 2007, the National Development and Reform Commission planned to have China's solar capacity increase to 1,800 MW by 2020. However, according to Wang Zhongying, the head of the National Development and Reform Commission's renewable energy development, stated that China would far exceed this goal, predicting that at least 10 GW can be installed by 2020, with 20 GW of installed capacity within the realm of possibility. Despite these predictions, solar energy accounted for only a small fraction of China's total installed energy in 2008.

The 2008 financial crisis prompted significant stimulus efforts by China to invigorate its then-struggling solar industry. Policy tools to stimulate growth in the industry included inexpensive land, tax incentives, and subsidized loans.

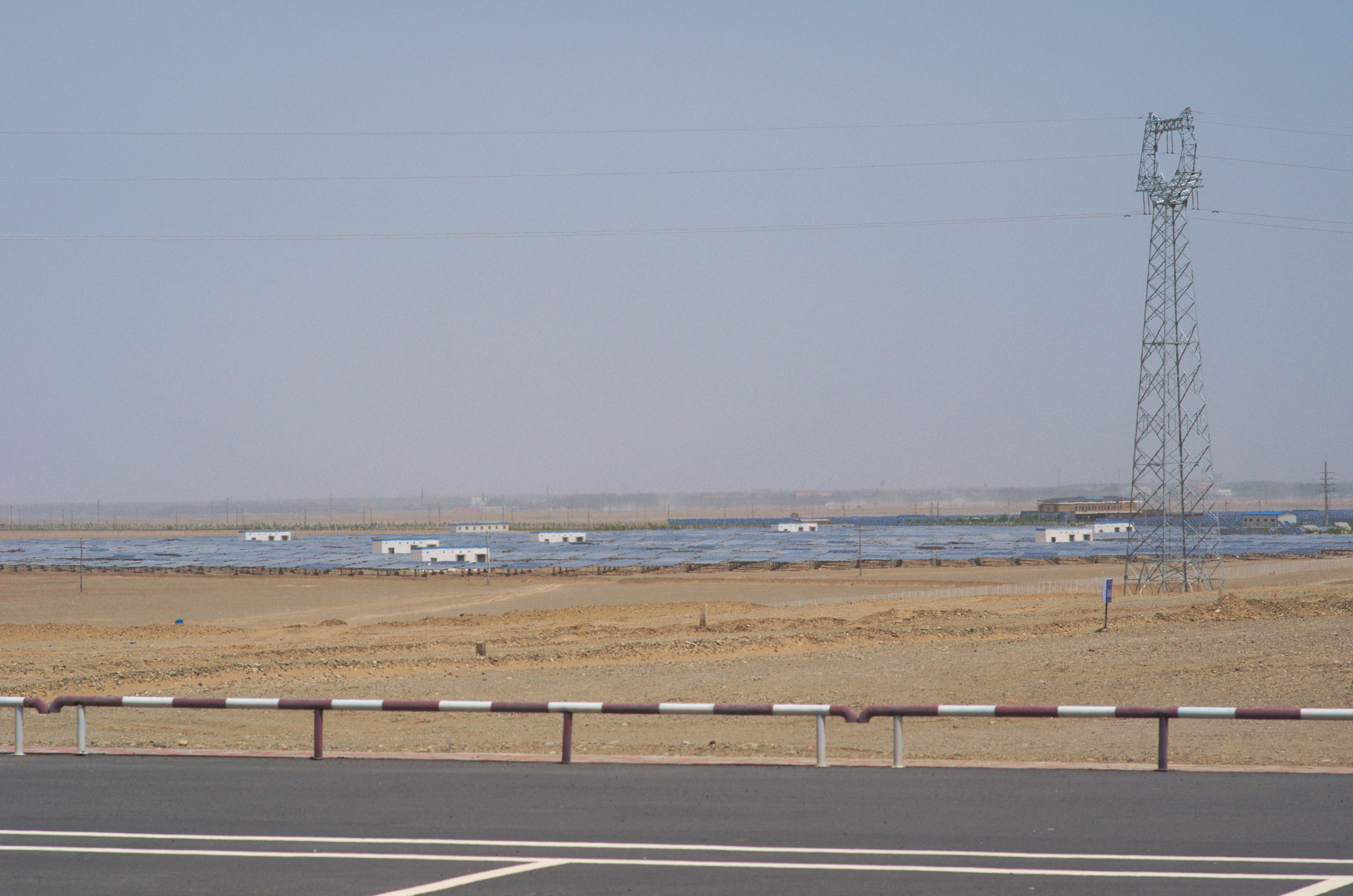
A part of Gansu Dunhuang Solar Park（10MW, Solar PV）

In 2011, feed-in-tariffs for solar power projects completed before a certain deadline were introduced. These feed-in tariffs were extremely successful at expanding China's solar power sector, largely exceeding the Chinese government's expectations for growth. The Huanghe Hydropower Golmud Solar Park was also completed in 2011 in Golmud, a county-level city in Qinghai province. The solar park contains 200 MW of installed photovoltaic capacity and was the largest individual solar plant in the world on its completion. Other solar parks such as the 20 MW Qinghai Golmud Solar Park were also installed in Golmud, with 570 MW of capacity installed in total at the end of 2011.

The Chinese PV production system faced severe external shocks since 2010. A sharp recession in the global demand due to institutional alterations in the German market in 2010, followed by anti-dumping duties and anti-subsidy countervailing duties on Chinese PV products enforced in both USA and EU. Chinese PV manufacturers, which were already running at full capacity, faced a difficult situation in 2011 and 2012 with huge financial losses that led to the bankruptcy of some important companies, such as Suntech Power in 2013 which defaulted on $541 million of convertible bonds. To rescue the huge PV industry with its large labor market and assets, a comprehensive set of policies was introduced by the Chinese government mainly to stimulate the domestic market. Accordingly, the annual installed capacity in China experienced notable growth since 2011. This growth was mainly due to the construction of several PV power plants around the country.

In May 2011, the National People's Congress (NPC) revised the solar target again, setting 5 GW as an official minimum PV target for 2015, with a longer-term target of 20–30 GW by 2020. According to a 2012 forecast by the European Photovoltaic Industry Association, the total installed capacity was predicted to reach between 47 GW and 66 GW by 2017.

Beginning in 2013, China's domestic demand for the solar industry rapidly increase.

In 2014, the National Development and Reform Commission increased the solar capacity target to 70 GW by 2017. The National Energy Administration also announced plans to install 100 GW of solar power along with other renewable energy sources and nuclear energy by 2020 in 2014. However, market analysts expected for 110 GW to be installed by 2018 and that by 2020, more solar energy could be installed than planned. In 2015, the solar capacity target was initially planned to be 15 GW but was increased in March 2015 by the National Energy Administration to 17.8 GW of installed solar capacity for the year. This target was increased again to 23.1 GW in October, a very ambitious goal considering that the annual solar energy installations for the entire world in 2010 were less than 20 GW. Despite these ambitious goals, China only 7.73 GW of solar energy in the first half of 2015. By the end of 2015, China installed 15.1 GW of solar energy, failing to meet both of the raised goals, but meeting the original goal. The plan for annual solar capacity for 2020 was also increased in October 2015 to 150 GW.

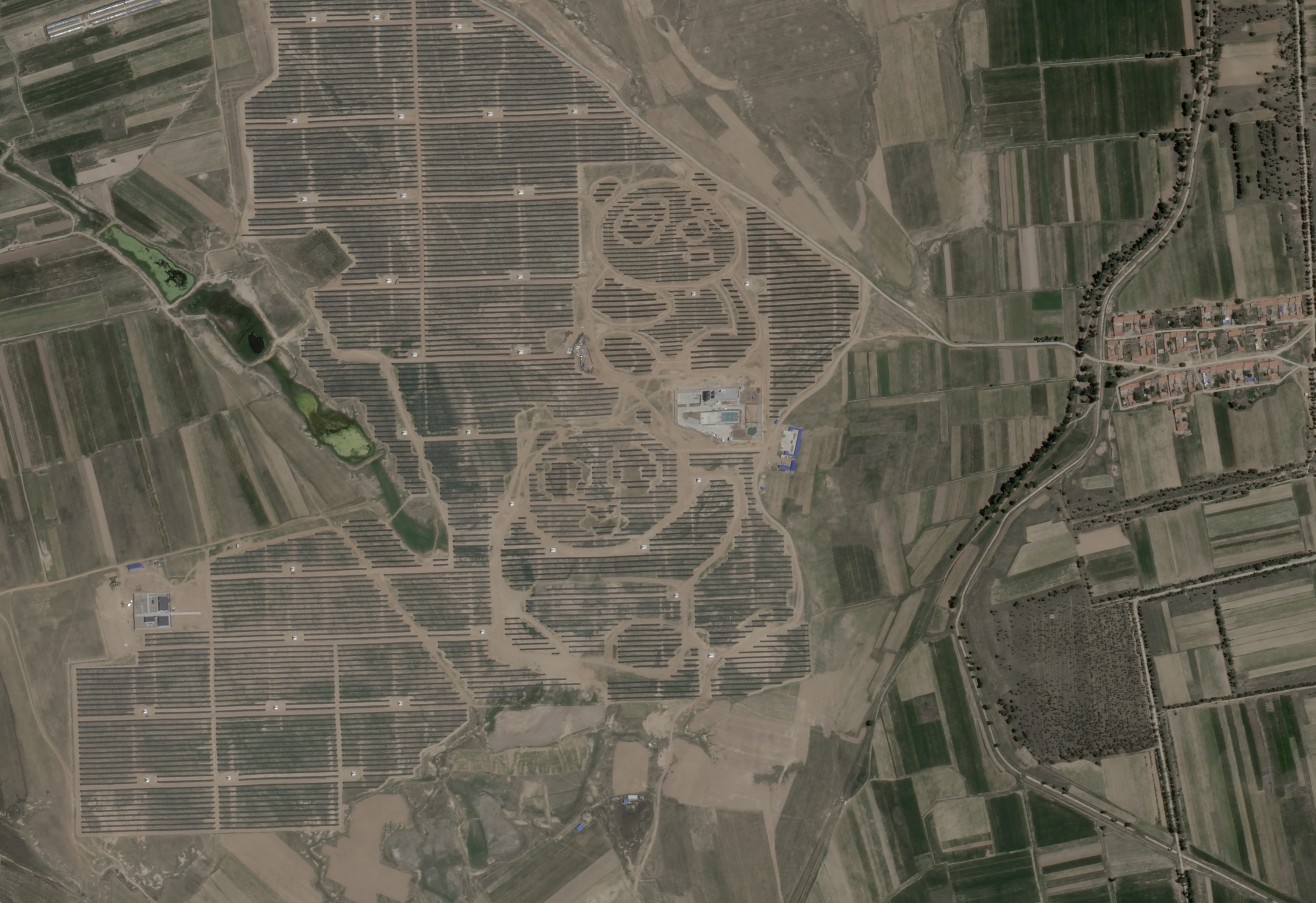
A 50 MW photovoltaic solar power station built in Shanxi Province in 2017

In 2016, China added 34.5 GW of solar energy. The first 105 GW solar capacity by 2020 goal set by Chinese authorities was met in July 2017. In the first nine months of 2017, China saw 43 GW of solar energy installed in the first nine months of the year and saw a total of 52.8 GW of solar energy installed for the entire year. 2017 is currently the year with the largest addition of solar energy capacity in China. China's total photovoltaic energy capacity at the end of 2017 was 130 GW, surpassing Germany as the world's largest producer of solar energy. In 2018, China saw a decrease in annual solar energy, dropping down to 44.4 GW. In 2019, annual solar energy installation further dropped to 30.1 GW, even lower than the installations made in 2016. This decline in growth is attributed to the Chinese government restructuring government incentives to start solar energy projects in May 2018. Despite this decline in growth, China remained the largest market for solar energy with 205 GW total installed capacity in 2019, which was almost as much as the total installed capacity in the European Union (132 GW) and the United States (76 GW) combined. However, from all of the total energy produced by China in 2019, only 3.9% of that energy was produced by solar energy. This was lower than the percent energy production from solar power of the European Union (4.9%) but greater than the percent share in the United States (2.8%).

In 2020, China saw an increase in annual solar energy installations with 48.4 GW of solar energy capacity being added, accounting for 3.5% of China's energy capacity that year. 2020 is currently the year with the second-largest addition of solar energy capacity in China's history. Combined with wind energy, almost 10% of China's energy came from non-hydroelectric renewable power in 2020. China's total photovoltaic energy capacity at the end of 2020 was 252.5 GW. China has stated that it aims to increase the energy share of solar and wind energy to 11% by the end of 2021. Renewable energy subsidies for 2021 for increased, with subsidies for solar power having increased more than subsidies for wind energy. The Huanghe Hydropower Hainan Solar Park was also completed in 2020 in Hainan Tibetan Autonomous Prefecture in Qinghai Province. The solar park has an installed capacity of 2.2 GW, making it the second-largest solar plant in the world as of 2021, behind the Bhadla Solar Park in India. The solar plant is connected to the world's first ultra-high voltage power line which gets all of its power from renewable energy and is capable of transferring power over 1000 km. The solar plant is planned to expand to a photovoltaic capacity of 10 GW.

At the Climate Ambition Summit in 2020, Chinese leader Xi Jinping announced that China planned to have 1,200 GW of solar and wind energy capacity by 2030.

Between first 6 months of 2022, China built nearly 31 GW of new solar power capacity, which up 137% compared to a years before. It expected the full-year installations would hit a record high. China added a total of 87.41 GW of solar in 2022, up 62% from the year before. In June 2024, China activated the world's largest solar power facility, a 3.5-gigawatt (GW) installation in Urumqi, Xinjiang. Built by Power Construction Corporation of China, this plant produces around 6.09 billion kilowatt hours (kWh) of electricity annually. As producers rushed to gain the last access to subsidies ending by June 2025, China set a monthly record of 93 GW of new solar capacity in May 2025.

Because solar works well as a distributed power source, recent Chinese policies have focused on increasing the prevalence of distributed solar energy and for developing systems so that electricity from solar energy can be used at its point of generation instead of transmitted over long distances.

== Solar resources ==
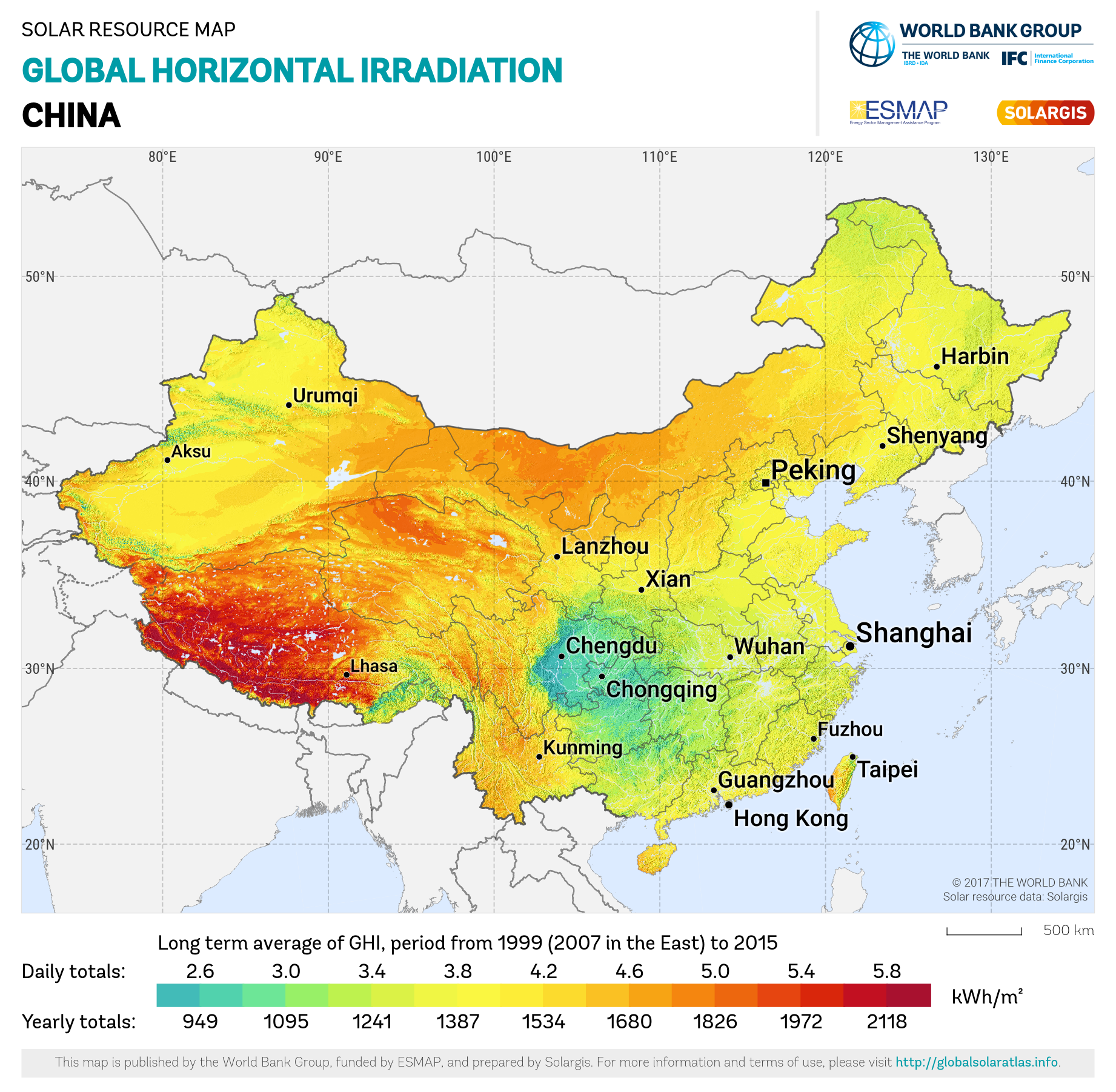
Global Horizontal Irradiation in China.

A July 2019 report found that local air pollution (black carbon and sulfur dioxide) has decreased the available solar energy that can be harnessed today by up to 15% compared to the 1960s.

== Solar photovoltaics ==
Photovoltaics
Year	Capacity (MW)	Installed/yr
1999	16	
2000	19	3
2001	23.5	4.5
2002	42	8.5
2003	52	10
2004	62	10
2005	70	8
2006	80	10
2007	100	20
2008	140	40
2009	300	160
2010	800	500
2011	3,300	2,500
2012	4,198	898
2013	16,137	12,119
2014	28,050	11,733
2015	43,180	15,130
2016	77,420	34,240
2017	130,200	52,780
2018	174,460	44,260
2019	204,680	30,220
2020	253,430	48,750
2021	306,560	53,130
2022	392,610	87,410
2023	609,490	216,880
2024	886,660	277,170
2025	1,202,000	315,000
Sources: IEA for years up to and incl 2011; China National Energy Administration for data from 2012 onwards

As of at least 2024, China has one third of the world's installed solar panel capacity and is the largest domestic market for solar panels.

=== Solar PV by province ===
A large part of the solar power capacity installed in China is in the form of large PV power plants in the west of the country, an area much less populated than the eastern part but with better solar resources and available land.

Installed solar PV capacity in MW by province
Province	end of 2015	end of 2016	end of 2017	end of 2018	end of 2019	end of 2020
China total	43,170	77,420	130,200	174,460	204,300	253,430
Shandong	1,330	4,450	10,520	13,610	16,190	22,720
Hebei	2,390	4,430	8,680	12,340	14,740	21,900
Jiangsu	4,220	5,460	9,070	13,320	14,860	16,840
Qinghai	5,640	6,820	7,910	9,560	11,010	16,010
Zhejiang	1,640	3,380	8,410	11,380	13,390	15,170
Anhui	1,210	3,450	8,880	11,180	12,540	13,700
Shanxi	1,140	2,970	5,910	8,460	10,880	13,090
Xinjiang	4,060	8,620	9,470	9,920	10,410	12,660
Inner Mongolia	4,880	6,370	7,430	9,450	10,810	12,370
Ningxia	3,080	5,260	6,200	8,160	9,180	11,970
Henan	410	2,840	7,030	9,910	10,540	11,740
Shaanxi	1,170	3,340	5,240	7,160	9,390	10,860
Guizhou	30	460	1,370	1,780	5,100	10,570
Gansu	6,100	6,860	7,840	8,280	9,080	9,650
Jiangxi	440	2,280	4,500	5,360	6,300	7,760
Hubei	480	1,870	4,140	5,100	6,210	6,970
Guangdong	640	1,560	3,310	5,270	6,100	6,970
Liaoning	170	520	2,230	3,020	3,430	4,000
Hunan	290	300	1,760	2,920	3,440	3,910
Yunnan	640	2,080	2,330	3,430	3,750	3,890
Jilin	60	560	1,590	2,650	2,740	3,380
Heilongjiang	20	170	940	2,150	2,740	3,180
Guangxi	120	180	690	1,240	1,350	2,070
Fujian	150	270	920	1,480	1,690	2,020
Sichuan	370	960	1,340	1,810	1,880	1,910
Tianjin	120	600	680	1,280	1,430	1,640
Hainan	240	340	320	1,360	1,400	1,400
Shanghai	200	350	580	890	1,090	1,370
Tibet Autonomous Region	170	330	790	980	1,100	1,370
Chongqing	5	5	130	430	650	630
Beijing	160	240	250	400	510	610

=== Solar PV by type ===
PV installations by sector, 2018
Sector	Annual MW	Cumulative MW
Power Plant	23,300	123,730
Distributed	20,960	51,250
Off-grid		360
Total	44,260	175,340

In 2018 23,300 MW of utility scale power plant installations were added bring the cumulative total in this sector to 123,730 MW of power. Distributed installations rose by almost as much during 2018 at 20,960 MW bringing the cumulative total in the sector to 51,250 MW by year end 2018. Off-grid solar was the smallest component in 2018 with just 360 MW cumulatively installed.

=== Manufacturers ===
Data on the world's largest solar PV producers, including China, Taiwan, US, Japan, and Germany

China has been the world's largest manufacturer of solar panels since 2008 and, since 2011, has produced the majority of global photovoltaics on an annualized basis. Industry projections estimated that, by the end of 2017, China would have enough manufacturing capacity to produce 51 GW of PV modules per year, an amount over twice as large as 2010's global production of 24 GW.

The industry is dominated by several major manufacturers. They include CHINT Group Corporation, JA Solar Holdings, Jinniu Energy, Suntech Power, Yingli, China Sunergy and Hanwha SolarOne. Large debt challenged several manufacturers in 2016.

On July 29, 2024, The New York Times reported that wholesale prices had fallen by nearly half in 2023 and by another 25% in 2024, but Chinese manufacturers were still competing for customers at prices far below cost while continuing to build more factories. By 2025, the industry had overcapacity and price wars. As a result, five leading optoelectronic companies had accumulated losses exceeding 28.9 billion yuan (US$4.15 billion) by 2025.

== Concentrated solar power ==
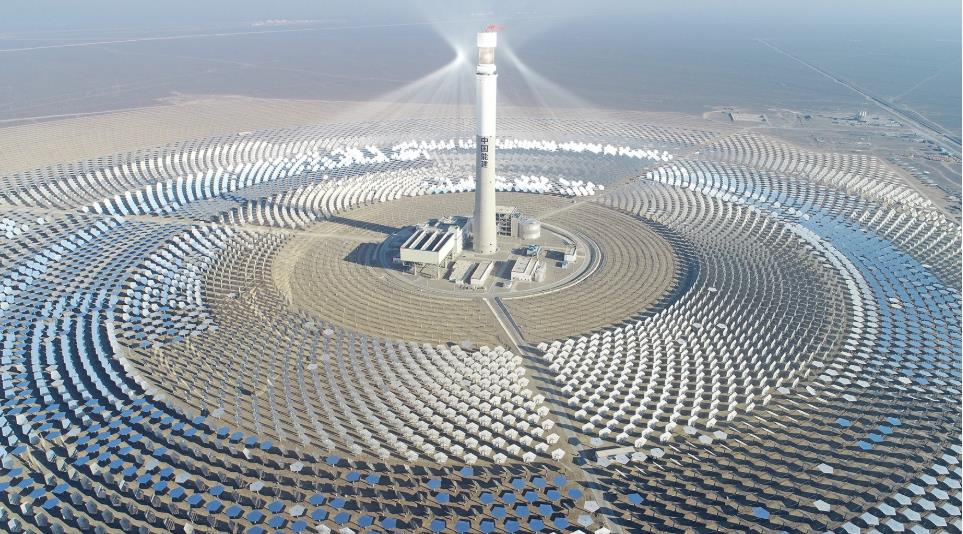
The China Energy Engineering Corporation 50 MW Hami power tower has 8 hours of molten-salt storage

=== Solar resource ===
China has large potential for concentrated solar power (CSP), especially in the south-western part of the country. The highest daily mean values of direct normal radiation are found in the Qinghai-Tibet Plateau and Sichuan Basin, at 9 kWh/m2. Most of northern and western China has daily average direct normal radiation over 5 kWh/m2, considered the limit for economical use of CSP. Practical limitations for deployment of CSP include mountainous terrain and distance from energy load centers, mostly concentrated in the east.

=== Public policy ===
The 12th five-year plan, for 2011 to 2015, called for the installation of 1,000 MW by 2015, and 3,000 MW of CSP plants by 2020. However, at the end of 2014, only several demonstration stations were operational in the country. In the subsequent 13th five-year plan a demonstration batch for 20 CSP plants for 1.35 GW was launched, which aimed to bring latest international technologies to China and build a domestic CSP industry. Plants were located in different provinces and used several different routes, including parabolic trough, central receiver towers and a novel beam-down tower design. The initially target for 2018 could not be met and deadlines were extended multiple times, and the initially planned second batch was canceled. At the end of 2021 the installed capacity stood at 550 MW. Chinese industry has gained considerable experience in the molten-salt storage technology and operating results of the plants are promising and meet their design parameters.

In the current 14th five-year plan there is no federal support for CSP. However, several provinces including Gansu, Qinghai, Xinjian UAR and Jilin have announced CSP projects in the context of the storage and peak shaving legislation. Optimistic assessments suggest that several GW could be built in the next five years.

== Solar water heating ==
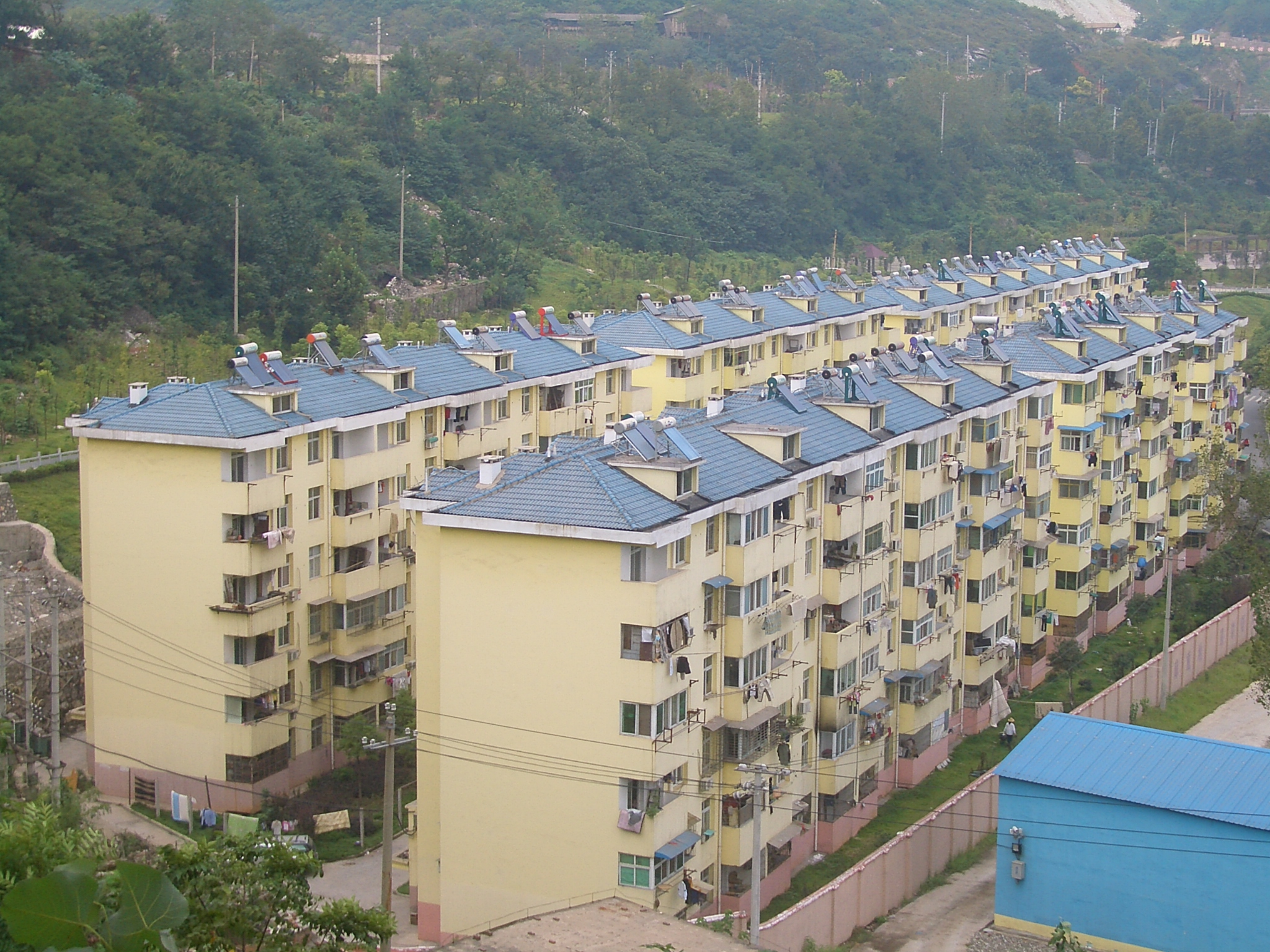
Rooftop solar water heaters are ubiquitous in China

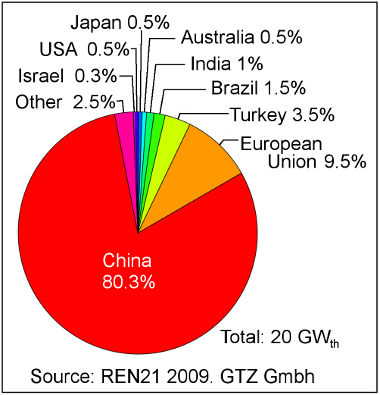
New solar hot water installations during 2007, worldwide

China is the leading country for solar water heating capacity in the world, with 290 GW_{th} in operation at the end of 2014, accounting for about 70% of the total world capacity. In terms of capacity per unit of population, China comes 7th in the world with 213 kW_{th} per 1,000 people. Most of the installed capacity (92%) was evacuated tube water heaters.

== Effects on the global solar power industry ==
The growth of solar power industries worldwide has been rapidly accelerated by the growth of the solar market in China. Chinese-produced photovoltaic cells have made the construction of new solar power projects much cheaper than in previous years. Domestic solar projects have also been heavily subsidized by the Chinese government, allowing for China's solar energy capacity to dramatically soar. As a result, they have become the leading country for solar energy, passing Germany's capacity in 2015. As other countries from around the world look to switch to renewable energy sources, cheap options for solar and wind have become focal points of interest for investments. China's mass production of cheap photovoltaic cells and wind energy have consequently spurred investments in Chinese products from around the world and expanded the construction of solar energy projects worldwide.

As of at least 2024, Chinese firms are the industry leaders in almost all of the key parts of the solar industry supply chain, including polysilicon, silicon wafers, batteries, and photovoltaic modules. China's impact on economies of scale and technological development was an important contributor in the 85% drop in the price of photovoltaic modules from 2010-2020.

== Government incentives ==
The China Development Bank provided $20 billion of financing to domestic solar manufacturers in 2010.

In 2011, new feed-in tariffs were promised to potential solar power developers to help drive investments and growth in the solar power market. The government of Qinghai province offered solar projects that were operational before 30 September, 1.15 yuan ($0.18) for each kWh they produced in May 2011. The National Development and Reform Commission offered same-priced subsidies to potential solar power project operators nationwide. These tariffs were not capped. Other subsidies, such as Top Runner and Poverty Alleviation programs, were used in conjunction with feed-in tariffs to help grow the solar power market immensely. These incentives were more successful in garnering attention and investment to the solar power sector than the Chinese government expected. Consequently, the Chinese government has struggled to keep up with these incentives. The government incentives have also contributed to the curtailment of solar energy, as many of the solar projects have been built in northern and western regions of China where there is a low demand for electricity and a lack of infrastructure to transfer energy towards China's main power grid.

In response to the growing problems of the rapidly expanding solar power market and the need to meet promised subsidies, the National Development and Reform Commission announced in May 2018 that solar power subsidies would be slashed and feed-in tariffs would be significantly reduced in favor of an auction-based system. In 2020, the Ministry of Finance of the People's Republic of China slashed the solar energy subsidy budget down to 1.5 billion yuan ($233 million) from 3 billion yuan in 2019. With the auction-based system, companies are to submit subsidies bids for solar power construction projects to the National Energy Administration. Companies that do not partake in competitive bidding must instead accept a largely reduced amount of subsidies for projects that are already in operation while new projects do not receive any subsidies outside of auctions. The switch to the auction system and capping of subsidies was designed to alleviate costs of solar subsidies and is attributed to the decline of the growth of the Chinese solar market in 2018 and 2019. However, the auction system has made renewable energy in western provinces cheaper than thermal energy in some cases, with Qinghai observing periods of time in which all of its energy usage was supplied through renewable energy.

China's budget for renewable energy subsidies was increased to 6 billion yuan for 2021, with solar power receiving 3.38 billion yuan. These grants are set to be distributed to 14 provinces, with Inner Mongolia receiving the majority of the funding with 5.10 billion yuan. The price guarantee ended in June 2025.

The government subsidies for solar power energy projects have been considered "unsustainable" as the costs of subsidizing a rapidly growing industry are massive and some of China's struggles dealing with the costs have become visible. The renewable energy fund, which is paid by consumers, has a 100 billion yuan deficit while tariff payments have occasionally been paid late. Government subsidies for solar power have also been attributed to over construction, as many solar power projects have been funded by the Chinese government but are curtailed (they do not operate at full capacity) due to the inability to transfer the full energy capacity from production sites.

== Environmental impact ==
=== Solar cell production pollution ===
Chinese green energy companies such as Luoyang Zhonggui High-Technology Co. in Henan have become large producers of polysilicon in response to growing the demand for solar cells. However, polysilicon production produces silicon tetrachloride as a byproduct. Silicon tetrachloride is a poisonous material that can make soil infertile and harm humans if it is not disposed of properly. In developed countries, silicon tetrachloride is recycled and reprocessed, preventing the substance from entering the environment. However, special technology and large amounts of energy are required to reprocess silicon tetrachloride. Chinese green energy companies have not invested in recycling this byproduct, instead opting to lower production costs and dump waste into nearby residential areas. This lack of investment into environmental safety protocols has also been attributed to Chinese factories attempting to open much sooner than it would take normally.

Some solar cells are also made with chemicals such as sulfuric acid and phosphine gas as well as metals such as lead, chromium, and cadmium. These chemicals and metals are toxic to humans through contact and contamination of resources. While many developed countries that produce photovoltaic cells have properly disposed of or repurposed wasted solar cells, many Chinese firms have not adopted the practice recycling solar panels and waste. Non-hazardous materials have also been dumped instead of repurposed, further contributing to waste.

Various protests over solar cell production pollution have been staged. In Zhejiang province, protests over the destruction of fish habitats emerged in September 2011. Hundreds of villagers rioted in the Zhejiang Jinko Solar Co., Ltd. factory, which produces photovoltaic cells and wafers. The factory had previously failed pollution tests in April and that its waste control was inadequate despite warnings from the local environmental protection bureau. The protests occurred over multiple days, in which company property was damaged and destroyed.

=== Climate change contribution ===
China has pledged to peak its carbon emissions by 2030 and has invested into renewable sources of energy, including solar power, to help meet this pledge. China has been opening new plants for solar energy production. Critics of China's climate policy argue that China is not trying to replace fossil fuels with renewable sources of energy, but instead trying to increase the energy capacity of both forms of energy. Although China's solar energy capacity has increased dramatically in recent years, its carbon emissions have risen as well. Consequently, critics have seen China's pledge to peak its carbon emissions as a time window for it to increase its carbon emissions rather than reduce them, with its investments into renewable energy sources such as solar power being used as a coverup for China's plan to continue expanding with fossil fuel-powered production.

The mass government subsidy-fueled construction of solar power plants has also been linked to climate change contribution as mass construction has contributed to increases in carbon emissions while the energy produced by the projects has not been fully used.

==== Green grabbing ====
China's expansion of solar power capacity has been met with criticism over implications of "green grabbing". Critics argue that China has seized land from native populations and repurposed it for its own projects, such as solar farms, using the need to protect the country from climate change as a justification for land seizure. Renewable energy projects, such as solar power plants, have been built in western regions of China where many native nomadic people have had their land taken away. As such, critics argue that investments into renewable energy sources such as solar power are means to increase the power of the central state rather than protect the environment. This argument has been complemented by China's expansion of fossil fuel plants in conjunction with solar energy.

Following claims of China has taken land from rural natives under the guise of climate protection, many rural populations have been encouraged to move to government housing or urban centers. However, as expectations for the arrival of urban citizens have risen, so has the construction of buildings infrastructure projects. This speculation of the growth of urban centers has led to a housing bubble in China, where buildings and infrastructure are being constructed at a rate in which much of the construction is unused or redundant. As these unused buildings and towns are constructed, more carbon emissions are produced due to the usage of cement and other building materials. Thus, China's "green grabbing" has also been criticized by environmentalists who see China's urban expansion as useless and damaging to the environment. The forced movement of rural populations, as critics claim that these rural populations do not receive adequate compensation for removal and face discrimination and a lack of support to thrive in urban centers in contrast to citizens who have lived in urban centers throughout their lives.

== Curtailment ==
The high amount of government incentives has encouraged the mass development of solar projects, especially in the northern and western regions of China. Consequently, there has been mass investment in energy production in low-population regions where energy usage is relatively low and not enough investment in infrastructure to transfer this produced energy to China's main power grid. This has caused the curtailment of solar energy to which critics point out to argue that many of China's heavy investments in renewable energy are inefficient and will become unsustainable for the country in the future. This inability to transfer energy to regions that require it has led many critics to call for China to invest more into power transfer infrastructure instead of solely energy capacity. Although curtailment rates have lowered since 2016, dropping down from 17% to 7% in 2016, some critics argue that these rates are still too high. Critics have used solar power curtailment as an example to argue for China to change its methods for dealing with the climate crisis as they see that its current efforts are ineffective.

== International relations ==
China's production of cheap photovoltaic cells has been the target of a large amount of criticism due to claims of forced labor being used to drive production costs down. Reports of large Chinese solar manufacturing companies using forced labor from Uyghurs of Xinjiang to produce photovoltaic cells have appeared. Reports for forced labor being used to acquire polysilicon, a key component of solar panels, have also emerged. Although the Chinese government claims that the labor used for material acquisition and production is voluntary, reports claim that there is substantial evidence that Uyghur laborers have been coerced to produce solar panels, threatened by re-education camps. As the demand for solar power increases due to climate change, the cheap nature of Chinese photovoltaic cells has resulted in China's solar exports growing massively in recent years in spite of the labor used in production. The usage of forced labor in China has only been partially condemned globally, in part due to the fact that many countries depend on China's cheap labor and photovoltaic cells to afford the transition from thermal energy to renewable energy. Since China is responsible for 80% of the world's polysilicon production, with half of the world's polysilicon produced in Xinjiang, many critics of the forced labor usage have stated that it is difficult for many countries to avoid Chinese made solar power solutions. As a result, debates over whether or not solar energy components from China should be used have arisen.

=== U.S. sanctions ===
In June 2021, the United States Department of Commerce placed five Chinese solar companies, including Daqo New Energy, on the Bureau of Industry and Security's Entity List. An extensive questionnaire was sent to companies by US Customs and Border Protection in early 2024. The survey indicated Customs taking a strong enforcement approach that will be difficult to answer for small/medium-sized solar companies without stable supply chains.

== See also ==
- Climate change in China
- Electricity sector in China
- Growth of photovoltaics
- List of photovoltaics companies
- List of power stations in China § Solar
- List of solar thermal power stations
- Renewable energy in China
- Solar Valley (China)
- Solar power by country
