= Jizhong Energy =

Chinese coal mining company

Jizhong Energy Group Company Limited
- Type: State owned
- Industry: Coal mining
- Headquarters: Xingtai, Hebei, People's Republic of China
- Key people: Wang Sheping, CEO
- Products: Coal
- Subsidiaries: Jizhong Energy Resource (SZSE: 000937)
- Website: www.jznyjt.com

Jizhong Energy Group Company Limited is a state-owned coal company located in Hebei, China. It is among the seven largest Chinese coal companies. In 2011, the company mined slightly over 100 million metric tonnes of coal in 2011, of which about 26 million metric tonnes were metallurgical coal. This makes it China's second-largest metallurgical coal miner after Shanxi Coking Coal Group.

The company was created in June 2008 by merging Jinniu Energy Group and Jizhong Energy Fengfeng Group. In addition to the coal industry, the company is engaged in the medicine, electric, chemical, mechanical and structural material industries. It has eight fully owned subsidiaries and three listed companies. In the 2013 Forbes Global 2000, Jizhong Energy Resource was ranked as the 1631st -largest public company in the world.

One of the main subsidiaries, Jizhong Energy Resource (formerly Hebei Jinniu Energy Resources Co, Ltd.), is listed on Shenzhen Stock Exchange (SZSE: 000937). In 2008, the company produced 12 million metric tonnes of raw coal and 4.92 million metric tonnes of coal, as well as selling approximately 9.67 million metric tonnes of commercial coal.
