= Eubank Landfill Solar Array =

Power station in Albuquerque, New Mexico

- Country: United States
- Location: Albuquerque, New Mexico
- Coordinates: 35°02′57″N 106°31′48″W
- Status: Operational
- Commission date: 2013
- Owner: Emcore Solar
- Operator: Suncore

Solar farm
- Type: CPV and PV
- Site area: 17 acres (7 ha)

Power generation
- Units operational: 48 Suncore CPV-Gen 3.5
- Nameplate capacity: 1.0 MW_{AC} (CPV); 1.0 MW_{AC} (PV)
- Capacity factor: 22% (average 2014-2016)
- Annual net output: 3.8 GW·h, 220 MW·h/acre

The Eubank Landfill Solar Array is a photovoltaic power station in Albuquerque, New Mexico that consists of 1.0 MW_{AC} of concentrator photovoltaics (CPV) and 1.0 MW_{AC} of flat-panel silicon photovoltaics (PV). It is the only utility-scale CPV system utilizing Suncore third-generation technology that is operational and grid-connected in the US. A portion of the output is being sold to PNM under a Power Purchase Agreement.

== Facility details ==
The facility was constructed by Suncore and Bixby Electric starting in 2012 on a former landfill near EMCORE's corporate headquarters in the Sandia Science and Technology Park. Suncore Photovoltaics Technology Co, Ltd, was founded in 2010 as a joint-venture company by Chinese LED optoelectronics manufacturer Sanan Optoelectronics (60%) and U.S. semiconductor manufacturer EMCORE Corporation (40%). EMCORE was also purchasing part of the facility's output for its local administrative and manufacturing operations.

The 1.21 MW_{p} (1.0 MW_{AC}) concentrator photovoltaics (CPV) portion of the facility consists of 48 dual-axis Suncore CPV-Gen3.5 solar tracking systems divided into 2 sections. The 24 systems of each section are connected in parallel to a central grid-connected 500 kW SatCon inverter. Each system supports 56 DDM-1090X CPV modules which are each rated to produce 450 W_{p}. Each module contains 15 Fresnel lenses to concentrate sunlight 1090 times onto approximately 1 cm^{2} multi-junction solar cells which were locally developed and manufactured by EMCORE, allowing 28% module efficiency which is greater than other photovoltaic power plants.

The Gen3.5 tracker system is especially notable for its tilt and roll design, which is unique among the trackers used by other CPV vendors. The same system is utilized at the 1.26 MW_{p} Evora Landfill facility in Portugal, and at Suncore's 138 MW_{p} Golmud CPV Solar Park, the largest CPV power station in the world.

== Electricity production ==
Generation (MW·h) of Eubank Landfill Solar Array
Year	Jan	Feb	Mar	Apr	May	Jun	Jul	Aug	Sep	Oct	Nov	Dec	Total
2014	121	117	147	142	264	585	486	477	430	456	345	281	3853
2015	210	280	328	384	403	378	360	372	324	273	250	225	3786
2016	166	202	251	254	280	256	271	340	406	495	443	371	3735
2017	128	190	273	293	318	301	287	269	239	246	177	154	2874
2018	131	154	199	241	278	298	260	260	249	186	153	111	2519
2019	171	180	269	316	337	379	359	365	301	296	184	134	3293
Average Annual Production for years 2014-2016 --->													3790

== See also ==
- Golmud CPV Solar Park
- Hatch Solar Energy Center
- Renewable energy in the United States
- Renewable portfolio standard
- Solar power in the United States
