= Ben-Gurion National Solar Energy Center =

Alternative energy research institute in Israel

Coordinates: 30°51′12.58″N 34°47′0.55″E

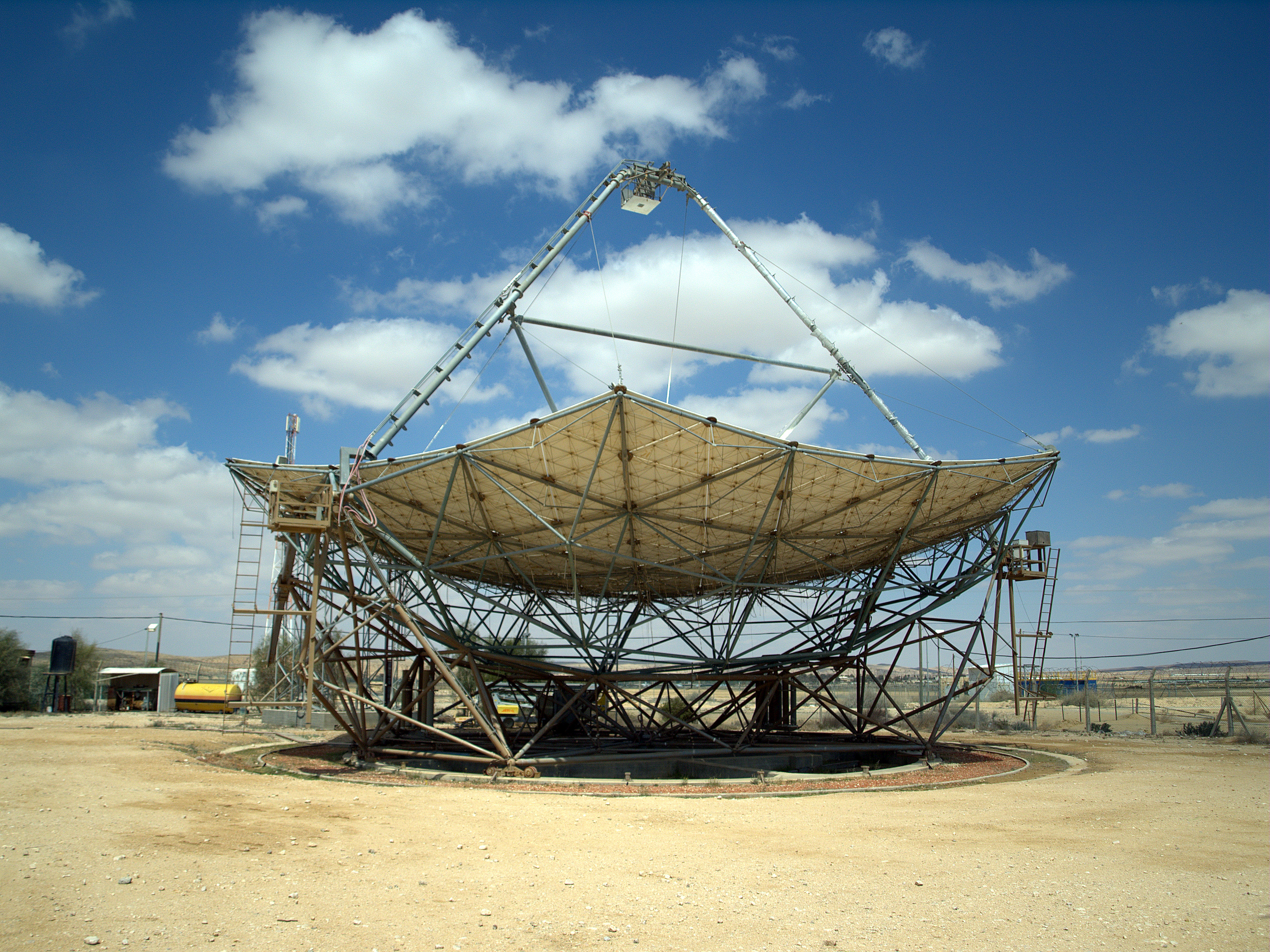
The world's largest solar energy dish is located at the center.

The Ben-Gurion National Solar Energy Center at Midreshet Ben-Gurion is the national alternative energy research institute of Israel. It was established in 1987 by the Ministry of National Infrastructures to study promising alternative and clean energy technologies, particularly those involving solar power. Since July 1991, the center has been operated by Ben-Gurion University of the Negev's Jacob Blaustein Institutes for Desert Research. Its director is David Faiman.

In 2007, it was announced that the center was collaborating with Zenith Solar to create a home system of solar cells based on technological research conducted under Faiman.

== See also ==
- Solar power in Israel
- Science and technology in Israel
