= Solar tower =

Solar tower may refer to:

- Solar telescope § Solar tower, a structure used to support equipment for studying the Sun
- Solar flower tower, a hybrid power generator
- Solar power tower, a type of solar furnace using a tower to receive the focused sunlight
- Solar updraft tower, a concept for a power plant that generates electricity from low temperature solar heat
- Solar chimney, a vertical shaft using solar energy to enhance ventilation
- Solar furnace, a structure that uses concentrated solar power to produce high temperatures, usually for industry
- STACEE, Solar Tower Atmospheric Cherenkov Effect Experiment, to study Cherenkov radiation
- Solar (room), a room in many English and French medieval manor houses
