= Solar power in Israel =

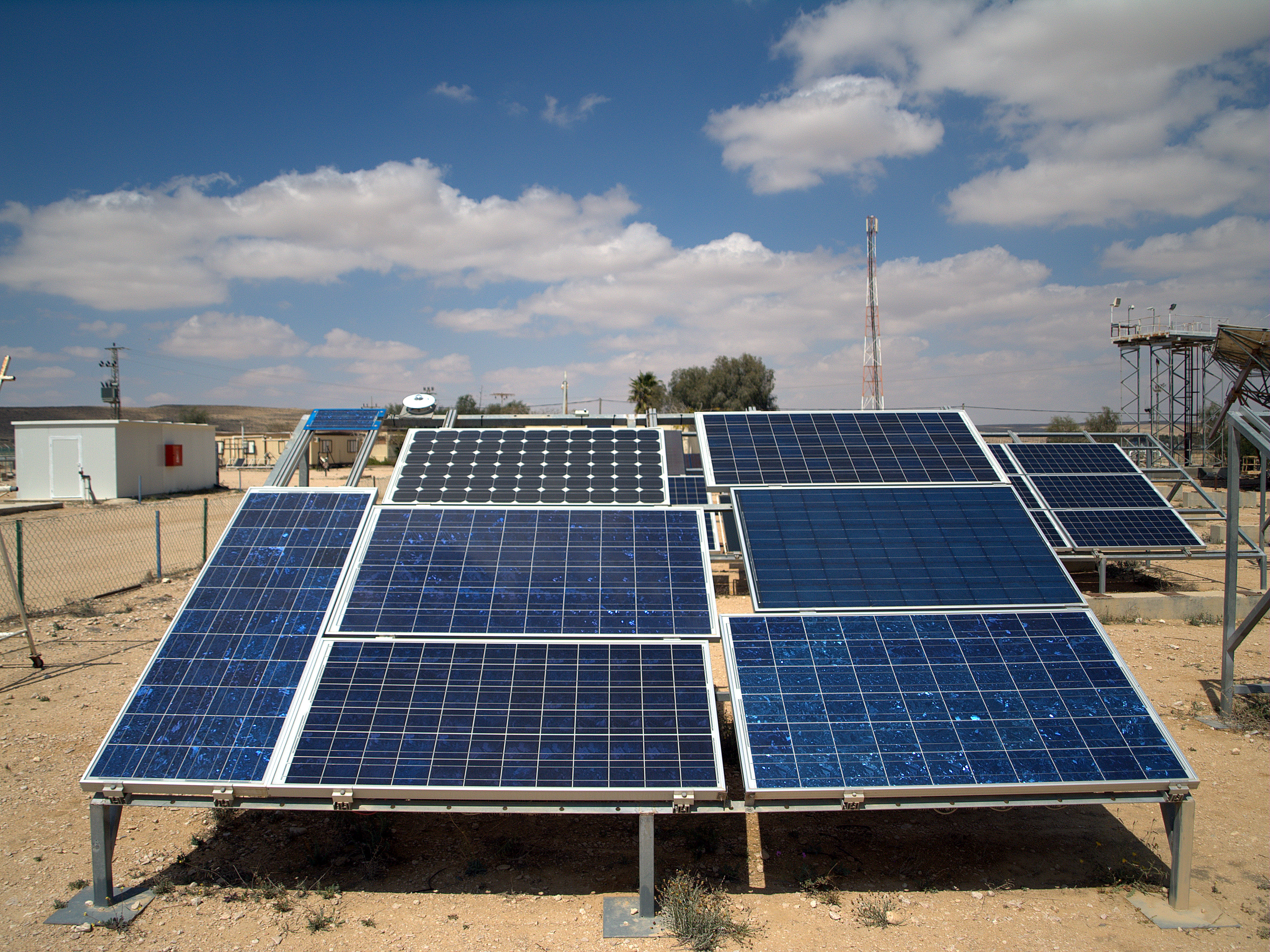
Photovoltaic arrays at the Israel National Solar Energy Center

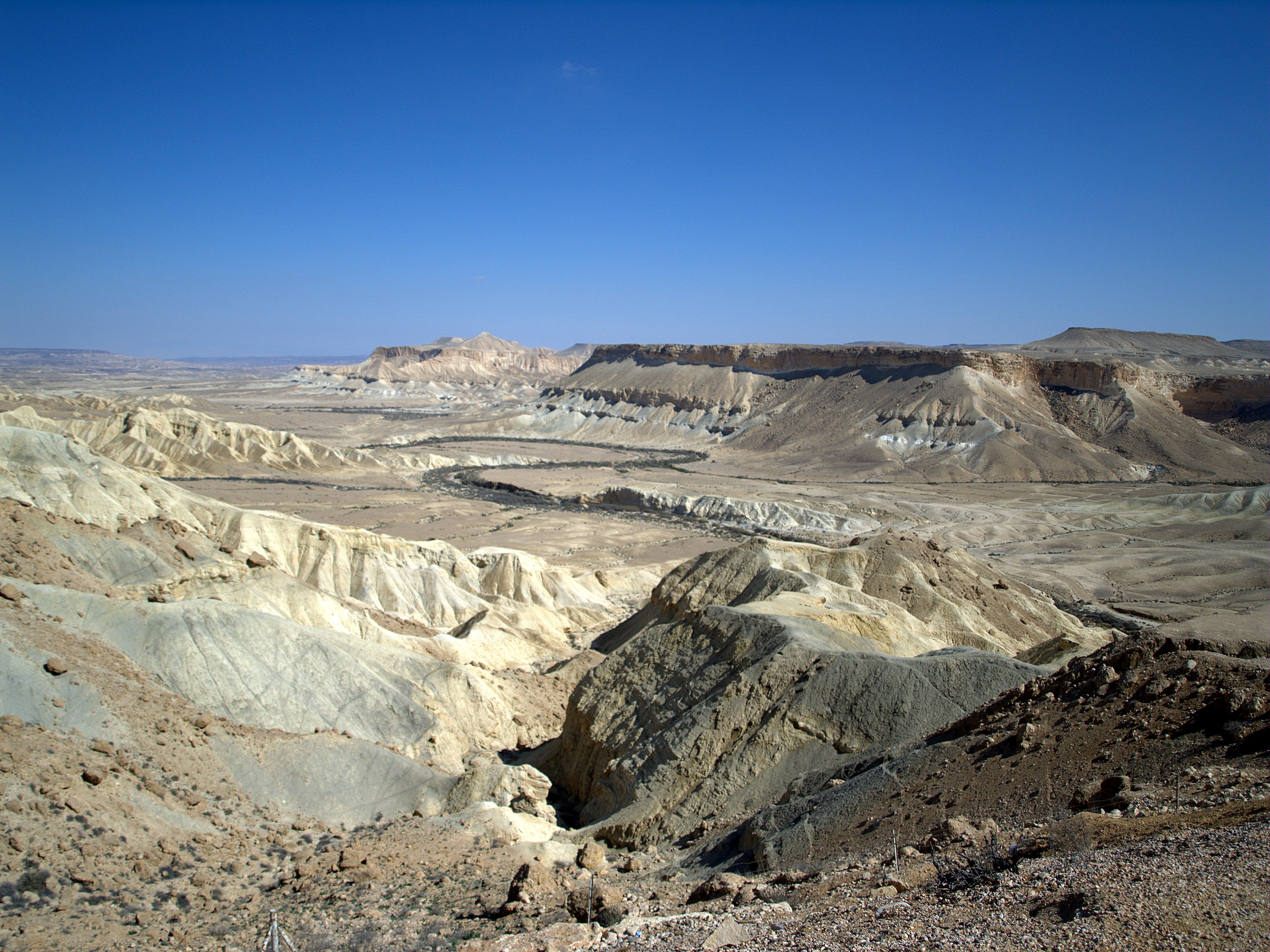
The Negev Desert is home to the Israeli solar research industry, in particular the National Solar Energy Center and the Arava Valley, the sunniest region of Israel

The use of solar energy began in Israel in the 1950s with the development by Levi Yissar of a solar water heater to address the energy shortages that plagued the new country. By 1967 around 5% of water of households were solar heated and 50,000 solar heaters had been sold. With the 1970s oil crisis, Harry Zvi Tabor developed the prototype of the solar water heater now used in over 90% of Israeli homes. There are over 1.3 million solar water heaters installed as a result of mandatory solar water heating regulations.

Israeli engineers have been at the cutting edge of solar energy technology and its solar companies work on projects around the world. However, even though Israeli engineers have been involved in both photovoltaic and concentrated solar power, the earliest Israeli companies which have become market leaders in their respective fields have all been involved in concentrated solar power. Some notable examples of this are BrightSource, Solel and Brenmiller Energy which all deal with utility scale projects. Additionally, Herzliya based SolarEdge has become a market leader in inverters for non-utility scale photovoltaic solar power.

In 2009, Israel found natural gas reserves within their exclusive economic zone which may reduce urgency of solar development. Solar technology in Israel has advanced to the point where it is almost cost-competitive with fossil fuels. The high annual incidence of sunshine in the Negev Desert has spurred an internationally renowned solar research and development industry. At the end of 2008, a feed-in tariff scheme was approved which has led to many residential and commercial solar energy power station projects.

Israel's objective in 2011 was to produce 10% of the country's energy from renewable sources by 2020, and officials from Cabinet and The Electricity Authority gave the goal in 2023 to produce 30% of the country's energy from renewable sources by 2030.

== History and development ==
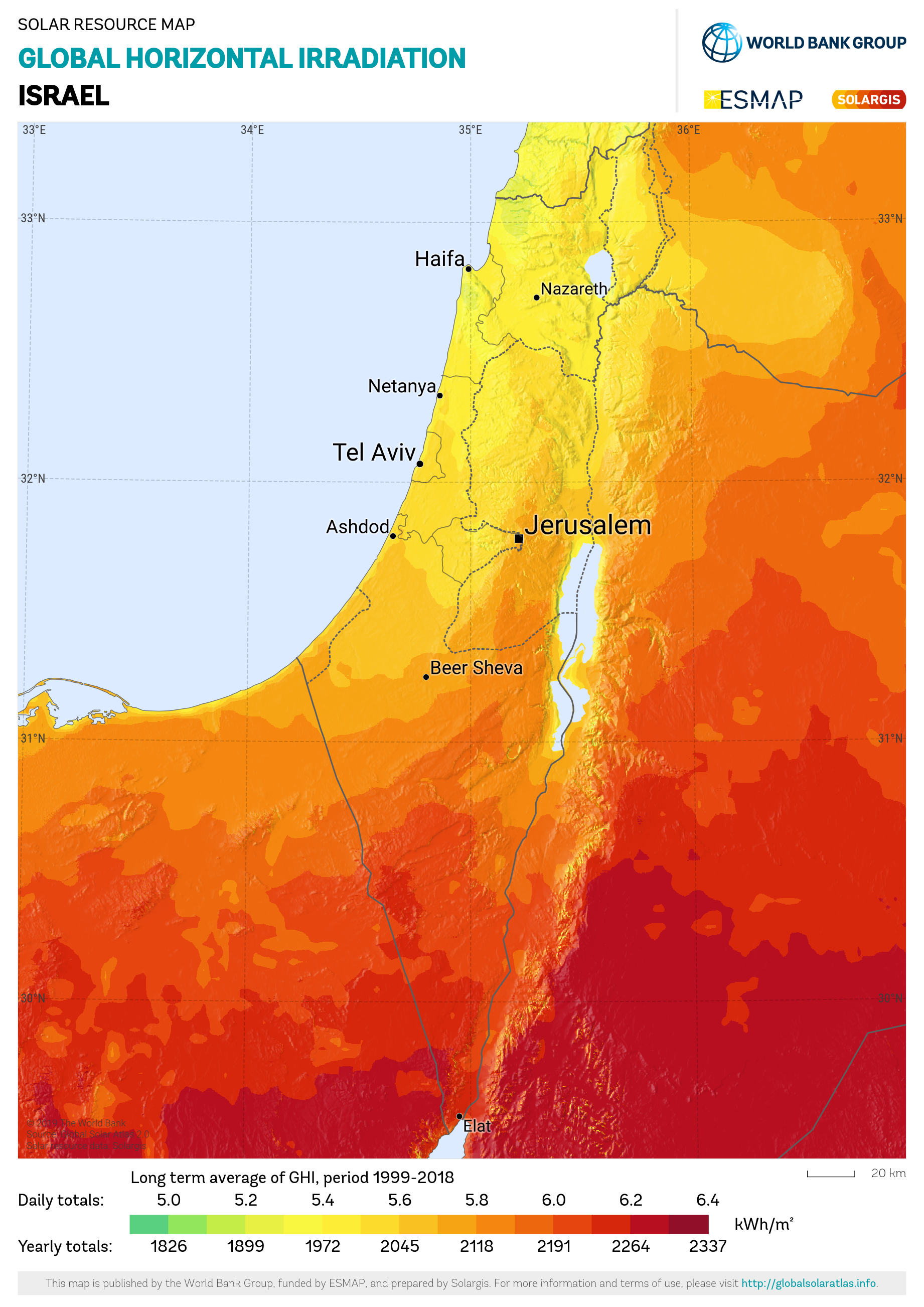
Solar potential of Israel

Israel renewable electricity production by source

In 1949, the prime minister, David Ben-Gurion, offered Harry Zvi Tabor a job on the 'physics and engineering desk' of the Research Council of Israel, which he accepted. He created an Israeli national laboratory and created standards amongst the different measurements in use in the country, primarily British, Ottoman and metric. Once the laboratory was established, he focused on solar energy for research and development.

Solar energy was particularly attractive because of the abundance and strength in Israel of the sun's rays and Israel's geographic latitude location is on the 30th parallel north, where the annual incident solar irradiance is 2000 kWh per m^{2}. Second, Israel lacks oil, and the conflicts with its neighbors made the procurement of a stable source of energy a national priority. In particular, it is argued that the best defense against missile attack felling the national power grid would be to build a distributed power network, which would mean solar fields of 25–50 megawatts across Israel.

Early in the 1950s, Tabor began to examine why solar installations were inefficient. He eventually devised 'selective black surfaces', which his team at the National Physical Laboratory modified using nickel and chrome methods to blacken metals. These surfaces, which became known as Tabor surfaces, are particularly effective at trapping heat for use in solar water heaters.

Tabor and French immigrant Lucien Bronicki developed a small solar power unit, the Organic Rankine cycle turbine, for use by developing countries with problematic power grids. It was designed to neutralize the maintenance issues of reciprocating engines so it had only one moving part, the rotor. A 3 kWe prototype was exhibited at the 1961 United Nations Conference on New Sources of Energy in Rome, but it failed to find commercial success.

Citing lack of land for ground solar PV parks, Israel mandated in 2023 that all newly constructed commercial buildings install rooftop photovoltaic solar panels.

Photovoltaics cumulative capacity (MW)
2004	2005	2006	2007	2008	2009	2010	2011	2012	2013	2014	2015	2016	2017	2018	2019	2020	2021	2022
0.9	1.0	1.3	1.8	3.0	24.5	69.9	190	237	481	731	780	905.6	1005	1450	1916	2248	3656	4750

=== Dead Sea solar pond ===
In 1965, Lucien Bronicki established Ormat Industries to commercialize the Organic Rankine cycle turbine concept. In the 1970s and 1980s Ormat built and operated one of the world's first power stations to produce electricity from solar energy, at Ein Bokek, near the southern part of the Dead Sea in Israel.

The plant used a technology known as the solar pond, a large-scale solar thermal energy collector with integral heat storage for supplying thermal energy. It was the largest operating solar pond ever built for electricity generation and operated until 1988. It had an area of 210,000 m^{2} and produced an electrical output of 5 MW.

=== Solar water heaters ===
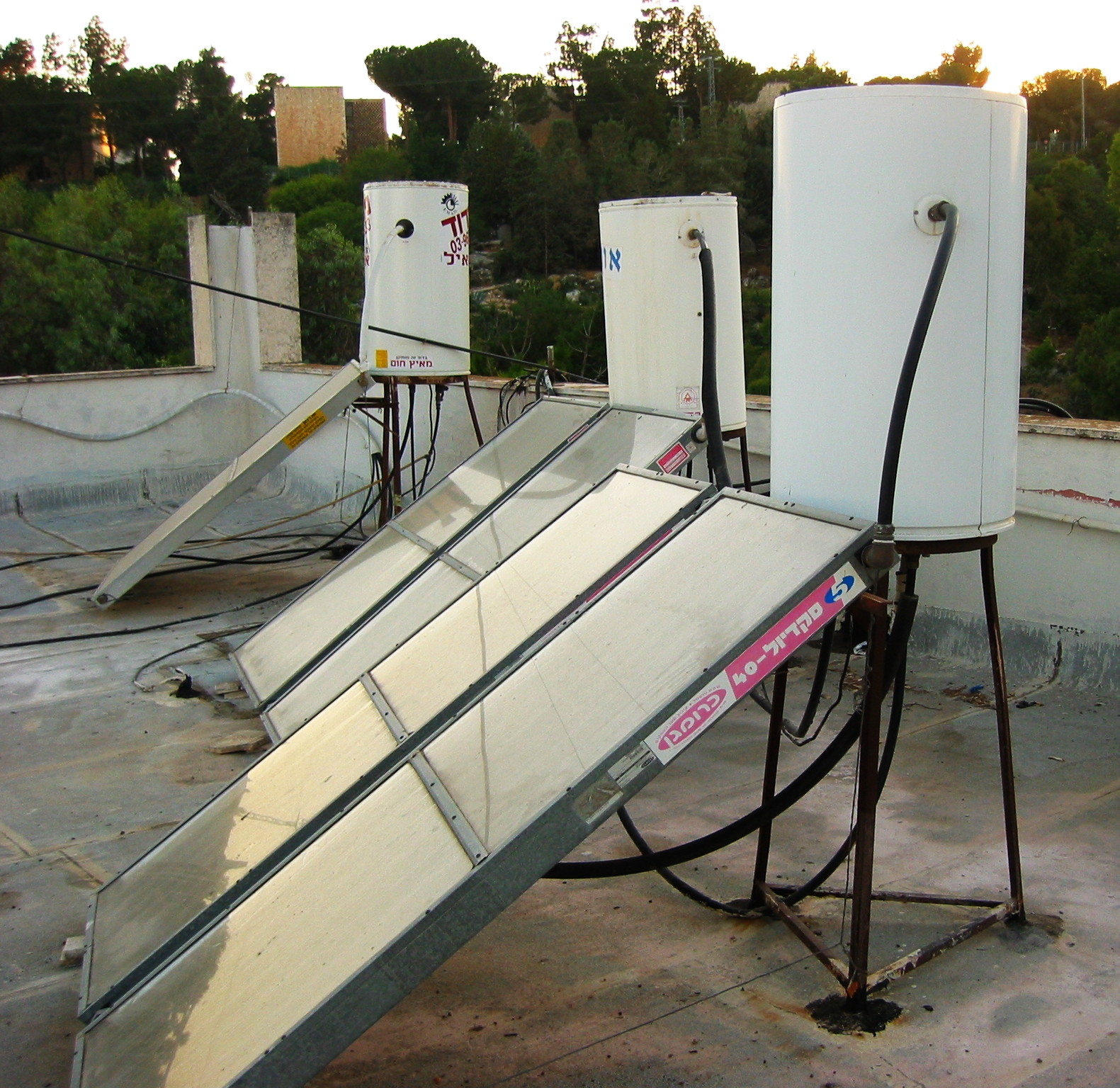
Solar water heater on a rooftop in Jerusalem

During the period of austerity in Israel in the 1950s, there was a fuel shortage, and the government forbade heating water between 10 a.m. and 6 pm. As the situation worsened, engineer Levi Yissar proposed that instead of the construction of more electrical generation plants, homes should switch to solar water heaters. He built a prototype in his home, and in 1953 he started NerYah Company, Israel's first commercial manufacturer of solar water heaters. By 1967 around one in twenty households heated its water with the sun and 50,000 solar heaters had been sold. However, cheap oil from Iran and from oilfields captured in the Six-Day War made Israeli electricity cheaper and the demand for solar heaters dropped. After the energy crisis in the 1970s, in 1980 the Israeli Knesset passed a law requiring the installation of solar water heaters in all new homes except high towers with insufficient roof area. As a result, Israel was in 2007 the world leader in the use of solar energy per capita (3% of the primary national energy consumption).

As of the early 1990s, all new residential buildings were required by the government to install solar water-heating systems, and Israel's National Infrastructure Ministry estimates that solar panels for water-heating satisfy 4% of the country's total energy demand. Israel and Cyprus are the per-capita leaders in the use of solar hot water systems with over 90% of homes using them. The Ministry of National Infrastructures estimates solar water heating saves Israel 2 million barrels (320,000 m^{3}) of oil a year.

== Feed-in tariff ==
On 2 June 2008, the Israeli Public Utility Authority approved a feed-in tariff for solar plants. The tariff is limited to a total installation of 50 MW during seven years, whichever is reached first, with a maximum of 15 kWp installation for residential and a maximum of 50 kWp for commercial. The National Infrastructures Ministry announced in December 2009 on expanding the feed-in tariff scheme to include medium-sized solar-power stations ranging from 50 kilowatts to 5 megawatts, though only one project had been approved by June 2010.

== Educational and research facilities ==
=== The Grand Technion Energy Program (GTEP) ===
Multidisciplinary scientists at Technion – Israel Institute of Technology are pooling resources at GTEP to advance the science behind solar power.

Nano science and solar energy

GTEP is working in the field of nano-energy.

- Efrat Lifshitz discovered that nano-sized materials consisting of nanocrystal quantum dots can absorb sunlight not only in the visible range, as materials currently used in solar panels do, but also in the infrared and UV ranges. This makes them ideal in photovoltaic cells used to turn sunlight into electricity, promising much more efficient solar power.
- Nir Tessler leads a group on organic photovoltaic material.
- Gitti Frey specializes in organic electronics – plastic electronics that are functional electronically and optically. They emit light and can transmit electrical signals, or absorb light and generate energy such as electricity. Frey introduces whole new properties in this field, creating effective and useful self-organizing structures on the nano-scale. Frey is working on a solar cell to convert sunlight into electrical energy. She predicts this research will lead to solar-power systems that are cheaper, unbreakable, flexible, better-looking, and versatile.

=== National Solar Energy Center ===
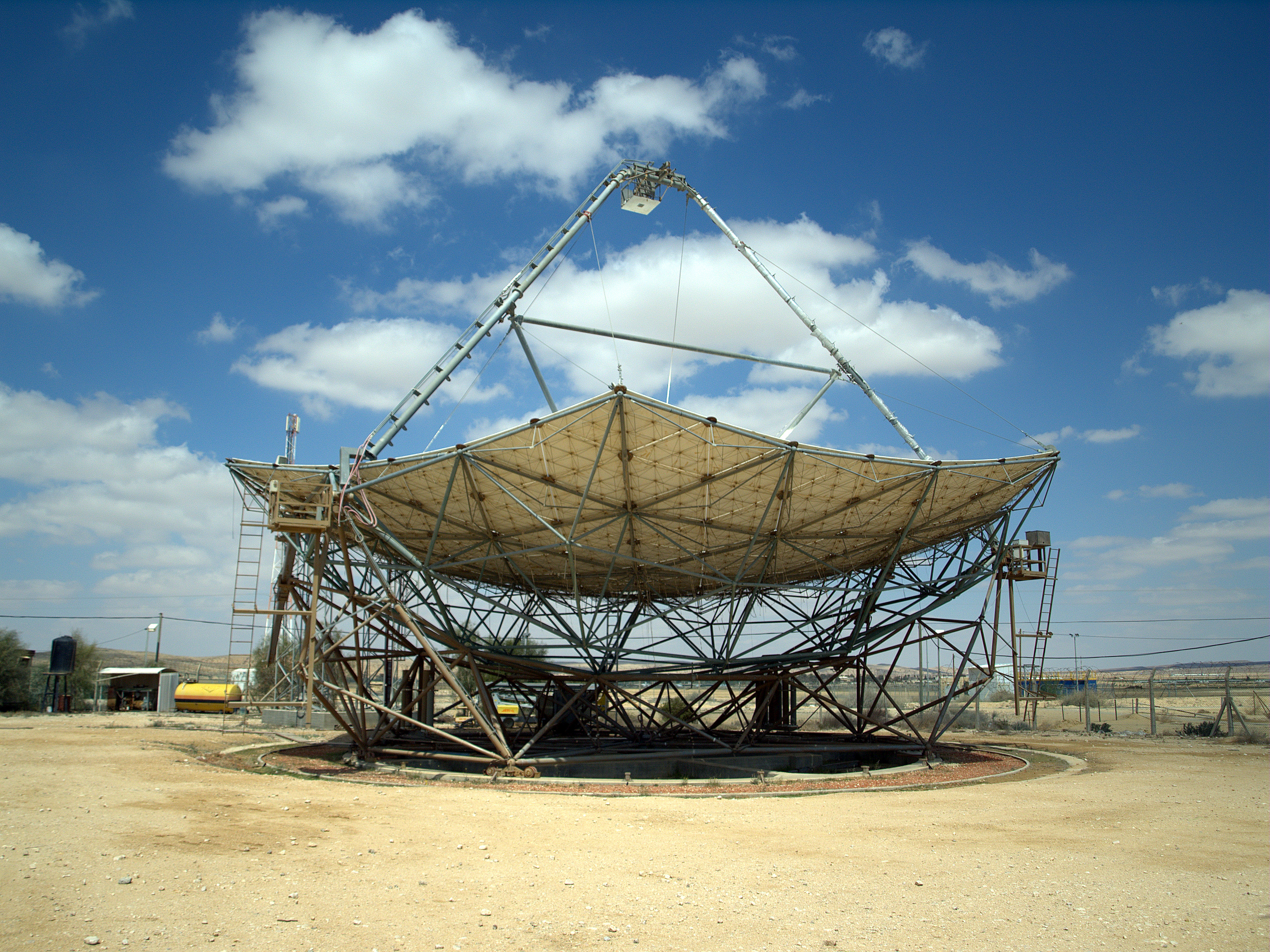
The world's largest solar energy dish is located at Ben Gurion National Solar Energy Center.

The National Solar Energy Center was founded in 1987 by the Ministry of National Infrastructures, and is part of Ben-Gurion University of the Negev. In 2007, David Faiman, the center's director, announced that the center had entered into a project with Zenith Solar to create a home solar energy system that uses a 10-square meter reflector dish. In testing, the concentrated solar technology proved to be up to five times more efficient than standard flat photovoltaic silicon panels, which would make it almost as cheap as oil and natural gas. A prototype ready for commercialization achieved a concentration of solar energy that was more than 1,000 times greater than that from standard flat panels. According to Faiman, who led the Israeli team that developed the technology, 10% of Israel's population (1,000 megawatts) could live on the energy from 12 square kilometers of land.

=== Jacob Blaustein Institutes for Desert Research ===
The Jacob Blaustein Institutes for Desert Research facility was founded by Amos Richmond in 1974 and is part of the Ben-Gurion University of the Negev. It has a solar energy research program that has assisted in the development of passive heating, involving the mitigation of extremes of heat and cold in the desert through efficient storage from day to nighttime. One research project is an inhabited adobe house with prisms that transmit heat during the day and can be rotated to allow the heat to discharge at night installed in the room.

There is a double-skin greenhouse that uses copper sulfate solution as a heat screen during the day. The liquid, pumped between the two skins, protects the interior from ultraviolet rays, and collects heat. At night the liquid is recirculated, returning the heat to the greenhouse.

=== Weizmann Institute Solar Research Facilities Unit ===
In addition to a solar reactor, the solar research facilities of the Weizmann Institute of Science are among the most advanced laboratories in the world for concentrated solar energy research. They have tested solar technology in the production of hydrogen fuel, which has been successfully trialed on a large scale. Tareq Abu-Hamed, an Israeli scientist at the University of Minnesota, with colleagues Jacob Karni and Michael Epstein, head of the Solar Facility at Weizmann, were the developers of a new method to produce hydrogen fuel more cheaply, efficiently and safely while solving storage and transportation issues.

Other innovations include harnessing sunlight for space communications and meteorological information; controlling light-dependent chemical reactions; and developing photodynamic cancer therapy.

== Solar power stations ==
=== The Negev ===
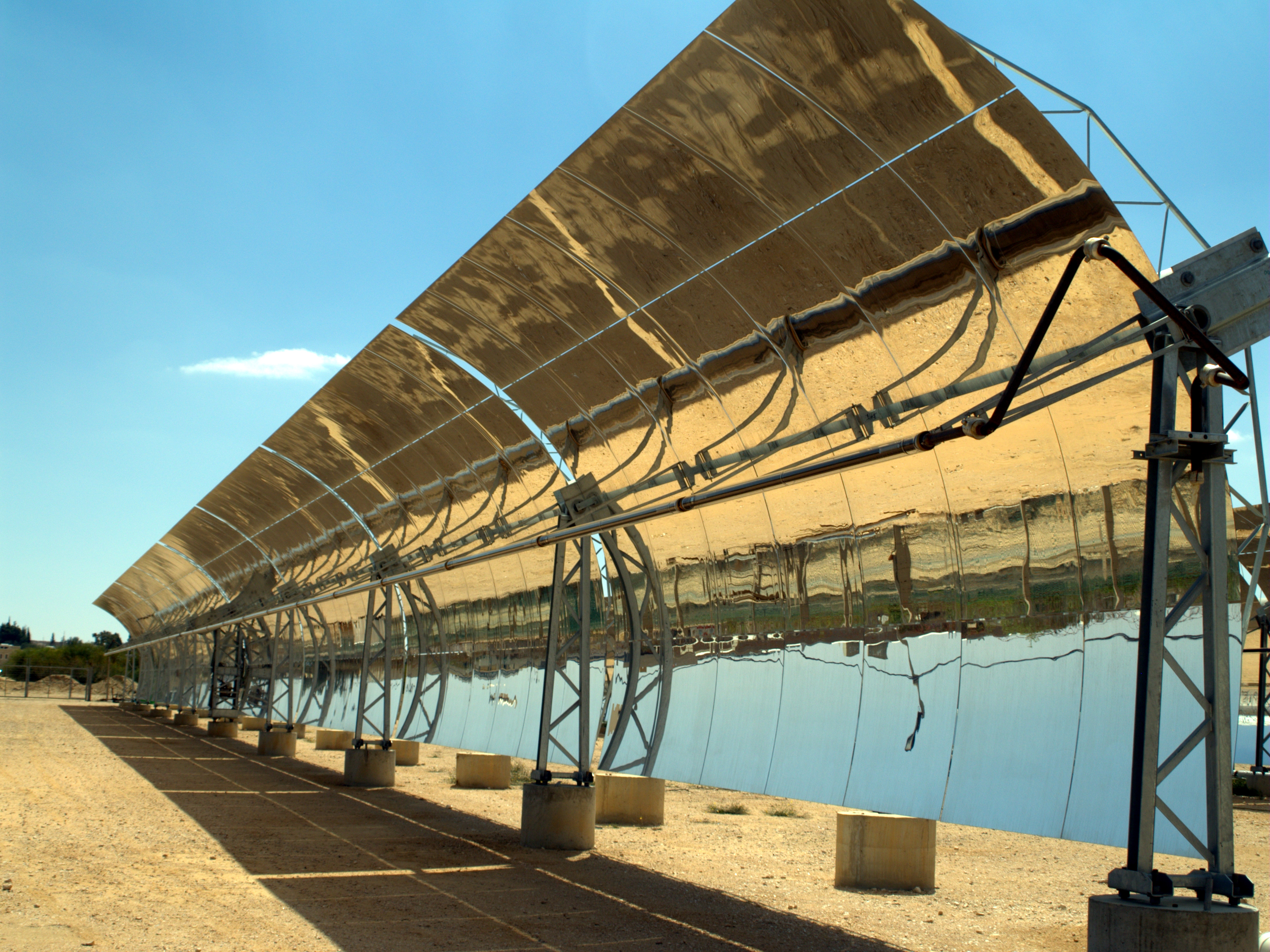
Solar troughs in the Negev

The Negev Desert and the surrounding area, including the Arava Valley, are the sunniest parts of Israel, and little of this land is arable, which is why it has become the center of the Israeli solar industry. David Faiman thinks the energy needs of Israel's future could be met by building solar energy plants in the Negev. As director of Ben-Gurion National Solar Energy Center, he operates one of the largest solar dishes in the world.

In May 2016, the 50 MW Zmorot Solar Park came online. The plant has a 207,000-panel solar park and took 18 months to construct.

In the Rotem Industrial Complex outside of Dimona, Israel, more than 1,600 solar mirrors focus the sun's rays on a tower to heat a water boiler to create steam. BrightSource Industries (Israel), Ltd., uses the solar array to test new technology for the three new solar plants to be built in California for Pacific Gas and Electric Company and Southern California Edison.

In 2020, a 120 MW solar power plant opened in Tze'elim, Israel's largest to date. The solar park expected to generate more than 220 GWh annually.

In December 2021, it was announced that Shikun & Binui won a contract to build a 330 MW solar power plant near Dimona, which is expected to become Israel's largest upon its completion in 2023. The solar park will also house a 210 MW energy storage facility.

In May 2023, the Israel Land Authority issued a tender to lease 11,331 hectares (28,000 acres) on land near Shaqib al-Salam between Highways 25 and 40 for a large-scale solar project.

As of September 2023, Israel has two solar-plus-storage projects, with the first being the Arad Valley 1's 17-MW solar farm with an energy storage system of 31 MWh, and the second being Sde Nitzan's 23 MW of solar and 40 MWh of storage capacity project.

In September 2023, solar farms extending 14,000 dunams, or 3,500 acres, near the Israel-Gaza border fence were proposed officially. The total cost of the project is over NIS 4 billion, and the proposal has the potential to produce over 2 GW of electricity. An extensive solar park is also proposed for an underground data center near Eilat as of late 2023.

==== Farming and kibbutzim ====
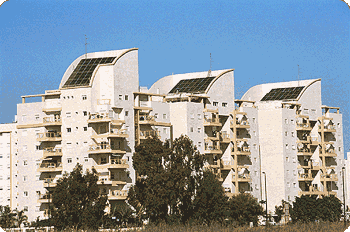
Solar panels installed on residential housing in Israel

Israel's first solar power station opened in August 2008. Moshe Tenne built the 50 KW plant on his Negev farm for NIS 1.3 million, and he expects to earn NIS 220,000 a year from selling excess electricity to the national power grid. After the National Infrastructures Ministry announced it would expand its feed-in tariff scheme to include medium-sized solar-power stations ranging from 50 kilowatts to 5 megawatts, Sunday Solar Energy announced that it would invest $133 million in photovoltaic solar arrays for installation on kibbutzim. In December 2008, the Sunday company announced that Kibbutz Reim in the western Negev would be the first community in the world to rely entirely on solar energy. The Reim installation, costing NIS 60–100 million, would generate at least 2.5 megawatts during peak consumption. Excess energy would be sold to the Israel Electric Company. The investment is expected to pay for itself in 10 years, and the costs and revenues will be divided evenly between the kibbutz and Sunday.

In April 2023, it was announced that energy company Teralight would be building one of Israel's largest solar parks, the Ta'anach PV project, in the Jezreel Valley, northern Israel. Ta'anakh solar will have 250 MW of installed capacity and 550 MWh of solar-plus-storage. The 250 MW of installed capacity "is equal to 5.2% of Israel's green energy capacity and 1.2% of its overall electricity capacity." The new solar park can power over 60,000 Israeli households, assisting nearly 250,000 Israelis.

In May 2023, the Israeli government announced it would be building four battery storage power station in the northern Gilboa region, making it one of Israel's largest energy storage projects to date. The initial buildout will total 800 MW/3,200 MWh, and each of the four energy storage facilities will have 200 MW of capacity, and all four will have four hours of storage duration.

=== Arava Power Company ===
Ketura solar field, 2012

Ketura Sun is Israel's first commercial solar field. Built in early 2011 by the Arava Power Company on Kibbutz Ketura, Ketura Sun covers 8.1 hectares (20 acres) and is expected to produce green energy amounting to 4.95 megawatts. The field consists of 18,500 photovoltaic panels made by Suntech, which will produce about 9 gigawatt-hours of electricity per year. In the following twenty years, the field should spare the production of some 125,000 metric tons of carbon dioxide. The field was inaugurated on 15 June 2011.

On 22 May 2012, Arava Power Company announced that it had reached financial close on an additional 58.5 MW for eight projects to be built in the Arava and the Negev valued at 780 million NIS or approximately $204 million. APC President and Co-founder Yosef Abramowitz stated, "Our work is not yet done. Israel needs to adopt the European Union goal of 20 percent renewables by 2020 and this major milestone by Arava Power is proof positive that it can be reached. Furthermore, an injustice must be corrected by creating a special quota of solar fields for Bedouin land owners, who are locked out of the current solar program."

Additionally, the Arava Power Company signed multiple agreements with Bedouin families in the Negev desert to build solar fields on approximately 37 hectares (92 acres) of land, with a production capability of up to 20 megawatts. APC has been lobbying the Israeli government to create separate solar caps for Bedouins.

On 7 February 2012, Arava Power announced that it had received a license for the Tarabin Solar Field, the first solar field for the Bedouin community. Financing for the $30 million Tarabin installation is to be provided by OPIC – the Overseas Private Investment Corporation of the United States Government. Arava Power President Yosef Abramowitz sees solar power for the Bedouin as a positive example for Native Americans, First Nations, Aboriginals and others with historic land claims.

=== Carmey Avdat Winery ===
Sunday Solar Energy was commissioned to build a solar installation for the Carmey Avdat winery in the Negev Desert. The 50 kW peak installation covers the 200-square meter roof of the winery and provides 65 percent of its annual energy needs.

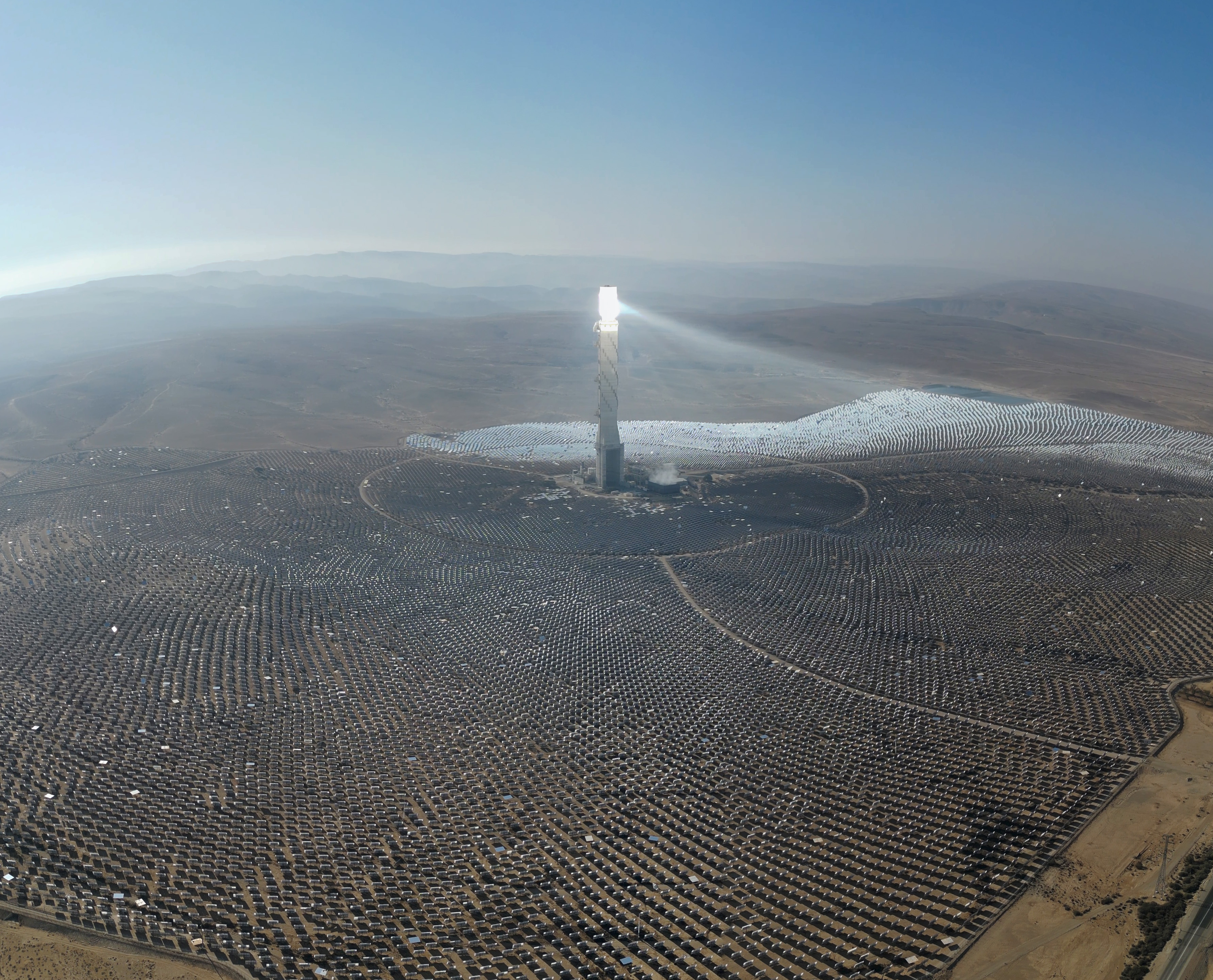
Ashalim Power Station, on completion the tallest solar power tower in the world.

=== Kibbutz Samar ===
The Aora's Solar "Flower" Tower is the world's first solar hybrid power plant, comprising 30 heliostat solar reflectors. The plant switches to natural gas-powered turbines after dark so that it can continue producing power 24 hours a day.

=== Ramat Hovav solar field ===
The Ramat Hovav solar field is 37.5 MW project near Ramat Hovav, operational since December 2014. The photovoltaic power plant is owned by Energix Renewable Energies Ltd It was built by the Belectric over a rehabilitated evaporation pond. The facility uses CdTe photovoltaic modules based on thin-film technology, manufactured by U.S. company First Solar, making it the country's largest PV power plant so far and one of the largest of its kind in the Middle East.

=== Ashalim ===
The Ashalim power station is a solar power station in the Negev desert near the kibbutz of Ashalim, (south of the district city of Be'er Sheva) in Israel. It had the tallest operating solar power tower in the world since 2019 but will be overtowered by a project in Dubai in late 2021.

As of 2023, Ashalim has two photovoltaic (PV) facilities generating 70MW in total, two thermo-solar power fields generating 120MW, and a fifth 100 MW solar energy plant in planning, which is scheduled to begin operations in 2027.

== Finance and business ==
=== Former providers ===
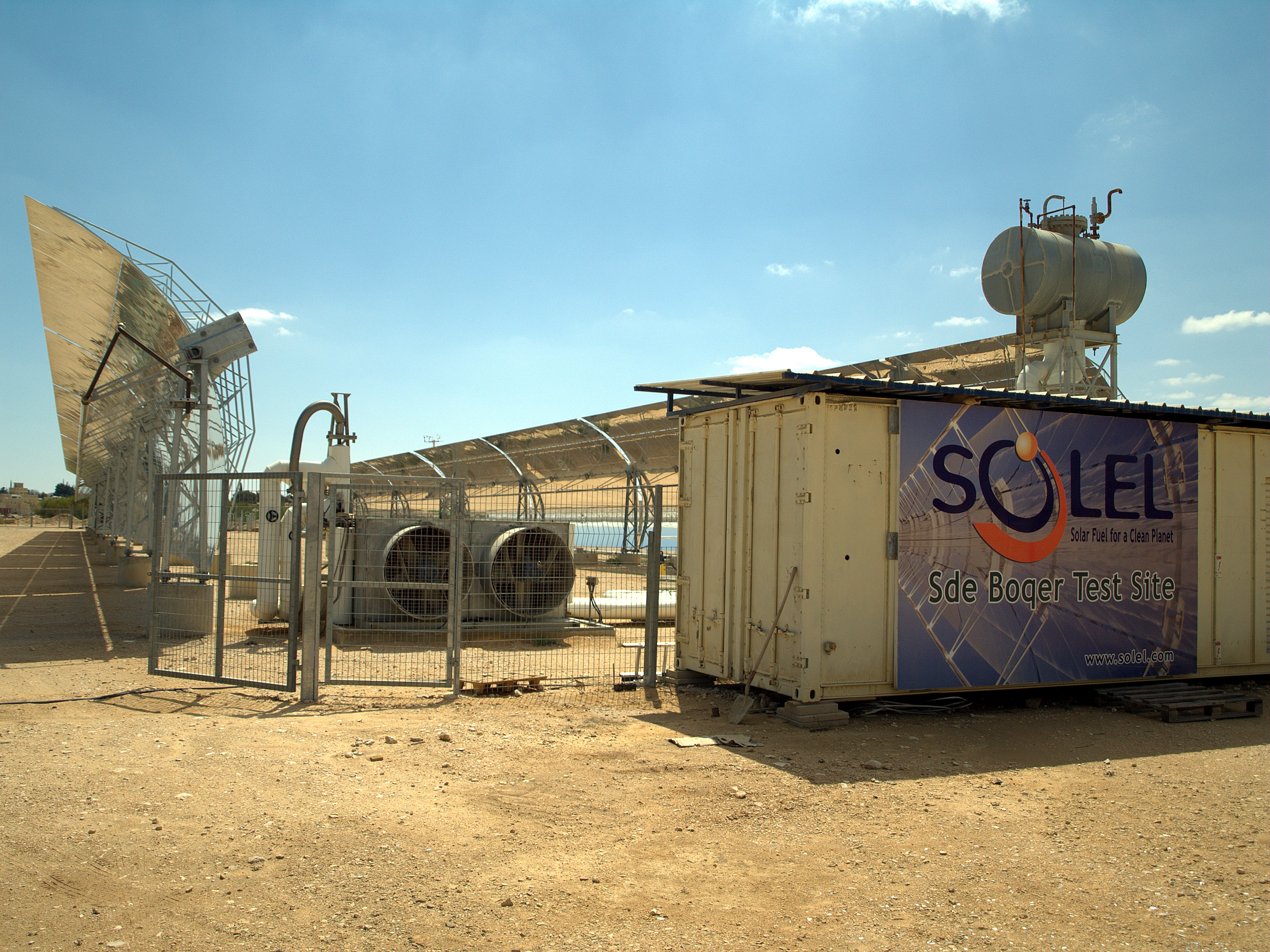
A Solel testing site in the Negev

- Solel has nine fields of solar collectors in the Mojave Desert of California.
- Zenith Solar pioneered "concentrated solar power", claiming it to be up to five times more efficient than standard PV technology, making it almost as cost as traditional fossil fuels. In December 2013, Zenith Solar was acquired by Suncore Photovoltaics Technology Company Limited, a Chinese-US joint venture that specializes in CPV.

=== Holdings and finance ===
- Arava Power Company was founded in 2006 on Ketura in the Arava Valley. On 5 June 2011, APC inaugurated Israel's first medium-sized solar field, Ketura Sun at 5 MW.

== See also ==
- List of photovoltaic power stations
- List of solar thermal power stations
- List of power stations in Israel
- Photovoltaic power station
- Renewable energy commercialization
- Energy in Israel
