= Golmud CPV Solar Park =

Solar power station in Haixi, Qinghai, China

- Country: China
- Location: Golmud, Qinghai Province
- Coordinates: 36°19′43″N 94°48′07″E
- Status: Operational
- Commission date: September 2013 (Unit 1); September 2014 (Unit 2)
- Operator: Suncore Photovoltaics

Solar farm
- Type: CPV
- Site area: 640 acres (2.59 km^{2})

Power generation
- Units operational: 5468 Suncore CPV-Gen3.5
- Nameplate capacity: 138 MW_{p}, 110 MW_{AC}
- Capacity factor: 18% (2014-2015)
- Annual net output: 175 GW·h, 275 MW·h/acre

Golmud CPV Solar Park is a 138 MW_{p} (~110 MW_{AC}) concentrator photovoltaics power station located near Golmud City in Haixi Prefecture, Qinghai Province, China. It is the largest operating CPV facility in the world, and was constructed in two phases by Suncore Photovoltaics starting in 2012. It is situated at an elevation of about 2,800 meters (9,200 ft) on the Tibetan Plateau near the Gobi Desert with several other conventional photovoltaic power stations.

== Facility details ==
The park includes the 270 acre 57.96 MW_{p} Golmud 1 unit located 7 km south of the airport, and the 370 acre 79.83 MW_{p} Golmud 2 unit located about 27 km east. Golmud 1 consists of 2300 dual-axis Suncore CPV-Gen3.5 solar tracking systems divided into 100 sections. Golmud 2 consists of 3168 systems divided into 120 sections. For the majority of sections at both units, there are 23 systems connected in parallel to a central grid-connected 500 kW Growatt inverter. For a fifth of sections at the second unit, 40 systems are connected to a central 1 MW Chint inverter.

Each system supports 56 DDM-1090X CPV modules which are each rated to produce 450 W_{p}. Each module contains 15 Fresnel lenses to concentrate sunlight 1090 times onto approximately 1 cm^{2} multi-junction solar cells, allowing 28% module efficiency which is greater than other photovoltaic power plants.

The Gen3.5 tracker system is especially notable for its tilt and roll design, which is unique among the trackers used by other CPV vendors. The same system is utilized at the 1.21 MW_{p} Eubank Landfill Solar Array in New Mexico, and at the 1.26 MW_{p} Evora Landfill facility in Portugal.

== Electricity production ==
A study of electricity production conducted over an 18-month period following commissioning of Golmud 1 in September 2013 showed performance at both units stabilizing within about 10% of expectations relative to measured DNI. The authors' data over the final 12-month period is reproduced from their graphs in the tables below, and also shows production when including their suggested 0-15% correction for system optimization activities during the first several months of operation. This result extrapolates to combined annual production at both facilities of about 175 GW·h. The authors' also note that the DNI measurements during the study period were generally 20%-30% lower than historical and regional DNI, a trend they speculated to be caused by a known recent increase in the level of airborne particulates in the Golmud locality.

Generation (MW·h) of Golmud 1
Year	Apr	May	Jun	Jul	Aug	Sep	Oct	Nov	Dec	Jan	Feb	Mar	Total
2014-2015 measured	4,000	5,200	4,500	7,700	6,900	6,200	6,600	5,200	5,700	5,600	4,700	5,400	67,700
2014-2015 corrected	4,600	6,000	5,200	8,900	7,600	6,500	6,600	5,200	5,700	5,600	4,700	5,400	72,000

Generation (MW·h) of Golmud 2
Year	Apr	May	Jun	Jul	Aug	Sep	Oct	Nov	Dec	Jan	Feb	Mar	Total
2014-2015 measured	--------	-------	--------	-------	-------	7,200	9,600	8,100	6,200	8,600	6,000	7,600	----------
2014-2015 corrected	--------	-------	--------	-------	-------	7,600	9,600	8,100	6,200	8,600	6,000	7,600	----------

Extrapolated Annual Combined Production of Golmud 1 and Golmud 2 (per corrected data) -->	175,000

== See also ==
- Huanghe Hydropower Golmud Solar Park
- Qinghai Golmud Solar Park
- Solar power in China
- Renewable energy in China
