= Zenith Solar =

Defunct Israeli solar energy company

- Founded: 2006
- Founders: Roy Segev, David Faiman, Bob Whelen
- Products: Solar energy
- Website: www.zenithsolar.com

Zenith Solar was an Israeli solar energy company based in Ness Ziona.

== History ==
Zenith Solar was founded in 2006 by Roy Segev, David Faiman and Bob Whelen.

In 2007, David Faiman, director of the Ben-Gurion National Solar Energy Center, announced that the Center had entered into a project with Zenith to create a home solar energy system that uses a 10 square meter reflector dish. Zenith bought the rights to solar technology from Ben-Gurion University and Germany's Fraunhofer Institute for Solar Energy Systems ISE to create solar energy using mirrors and lenses that magnify and focus the sun's rays. In testing, the concentrated solar technology proved to be up to five times more efficient than standard flat photovoltaic silicon panels, which would make it almost as cheap as oil and natural gas. A prototype ready for commercialization achieved a concentration of solar energy that was more than 1,000 times greater than standard flat panels. According to Faiman, who led the Israeli team that developed the technology, 10% of Israel’s energy needs (1,000 megawatts) could be met from 12 square kilometres of land.

Zenith Solar was assembling solar panel kits at its factory in Kiryat Gat. The company used CHP (combined heat and power) technology which it claimed reached efficiencies of over 70%. Marketing claims included "harvesting more energy from a smaller space, less landfill produced from their waste." and "99% recyclable."

In June 2013 Zenith filed for bankruptcy and in December of that year they were acquired by Suncore Photovoltaics Technology Company Limited, a Chinese-US joint venture that specialises in CPV.

== See also ==
- Solar energy in Israel
- Science and technology in Israel
