= Energix Renewable Energies =

Energix Renewable Energies Ltd.

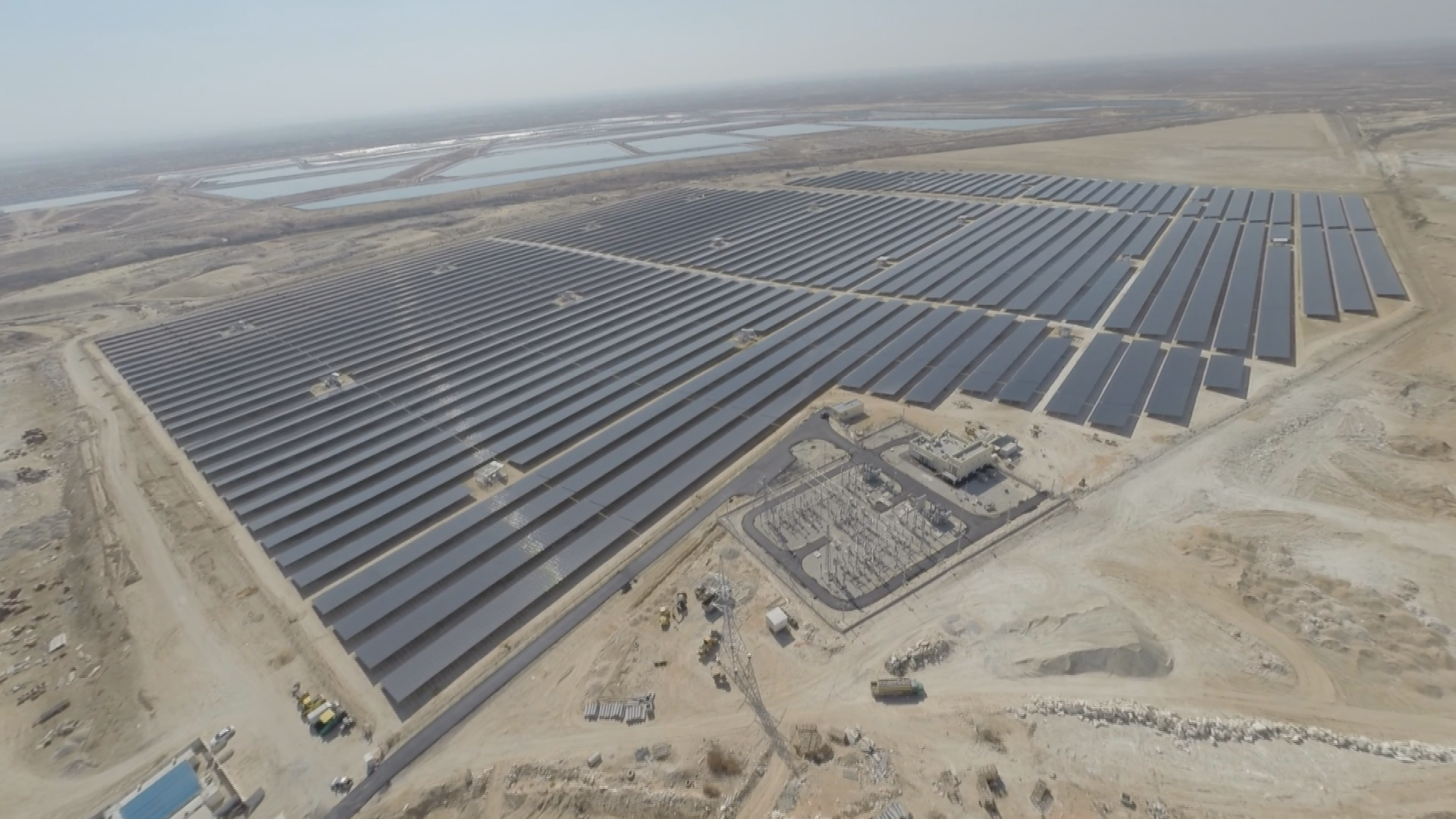
- Neot Hovav Solar Farm
- Type: Renewable Energy Company
- Traded as: TASE: ENRG
- Industry: Electric utilities
- Founded: 2009
- Headquarters: Ramat Gan, Israel
- Area served: Israel, Poland
- Key people: Mr. Asa (Asi) Levinger CEO, Mr Nathan Hetz, Chairman of the Board
- Products: Solar Energy and Wind Energy
- Revenue: ▲₪ 60.03 million (2015)
- Operating income: ▲₪ 22.38 million (2015)
- Net income: ▲₪ 9.04 million (2015)
- Total equity: ▲₪ 519.41 million (2015)
- Number of employees: 25
- Website: www.energix-group.com/

Energix Renewable Energies Ltd. is a power producer specializing in renewable energy, currently active mainly in the field of Photovoltaics and Wind power. Energix is a public company traded in the Tel Aviv Stock Exchange since May 2011 (TASE: ENRG).

Energix is owned (72%) by Alony Hetz Properties and Investments Ltd. (TASE: "ALHE”), one of the largest real-estate investment group in Israel.

== History ==
Energix was founded in 2009 as a fully owned subsidiary of Amot Investments Ltd. (TASE: "AMOT”), the Israeli real estate subsidiary of Alony Hetz, under the name of Amot Energy Ltd. Energix made its first steps by installing "small scaled" (50 KWp) roof-top PV systems on industrial parks buildings owned by Amot industrial parks.

In 2010, Energix began developing "medium scaled" projects both on assets owned by Amot as well as through assets owned by its partnership it established with the Granot group.

In December 2014, after an 11 month construction period, Energix has connected the Neot Hovav 37.5 MWp solar park. It was the first and largest Grid Connected PV Solar Park in Israel.

In December 2015, Energix completed the construction of a wind farm with a capacity of 50 MW in Poland. It is the first stage out of a total capacity of 192 MW.

Energix is the winner of "The most Innovative Renewable Energy Company Award" for 2015 of The New Economy Magazine. It is the first Israeli company to win an award in the magazine.

Energix' involvement in a project involves financing, gathering regulatory approval, subcontractor management and upon completion of the project, ownership, maintenance and operations of the site.

Energix is located in the Moshe Aviv Tower, Ramat Gan, and currently employs around 25 employees.

== Criticism ==
=== Involvement in Israeli settlements ===
On 12 February 2020, the United Nations published a database of 112 companies helping to further Israeli settlement activity in the West Bank, including East Jerusalem, as well as in the occupied Golan Heights. These settlements are considered illegal under international law. Energix was listed on the database on account of its "use of natural resources, in particular water and land, for business purposes" in these occupied territories.

On 5 July 2021, Norway's largest pension fund KLP said it would divest from Energix together with 15 other business entities implicated in the UN report for their links to Israeli settlements in the occupied West Bank. Energix Renewable Energies stated that, as of June 2021, it had divested from its activities in the West Bank.

== See also ==
- Wind Energy
- Solar Energy
- Solar power in Israel
- Wind power in Poland
- Renewable energy in Israel
- Renewable energy in Poland
