= Solel =

Israeli solar thermal equipment designer

Solel Solar Systems Ltd.
- Industry: Solar energy
- Headquarters: Beit Shemesh, Israel
- Products: solar thermal equipment
- Parent: Siemens

Solel Solar Systems Ltd. (Hebrew: סולל) was an Israeli solar thermal equipment designer and manufacturer based in Beit Shemesh, Israel. Solel made equipment for solar thermal power plants, facilities that used the sun's heat to create steam and turn an electricity generator.

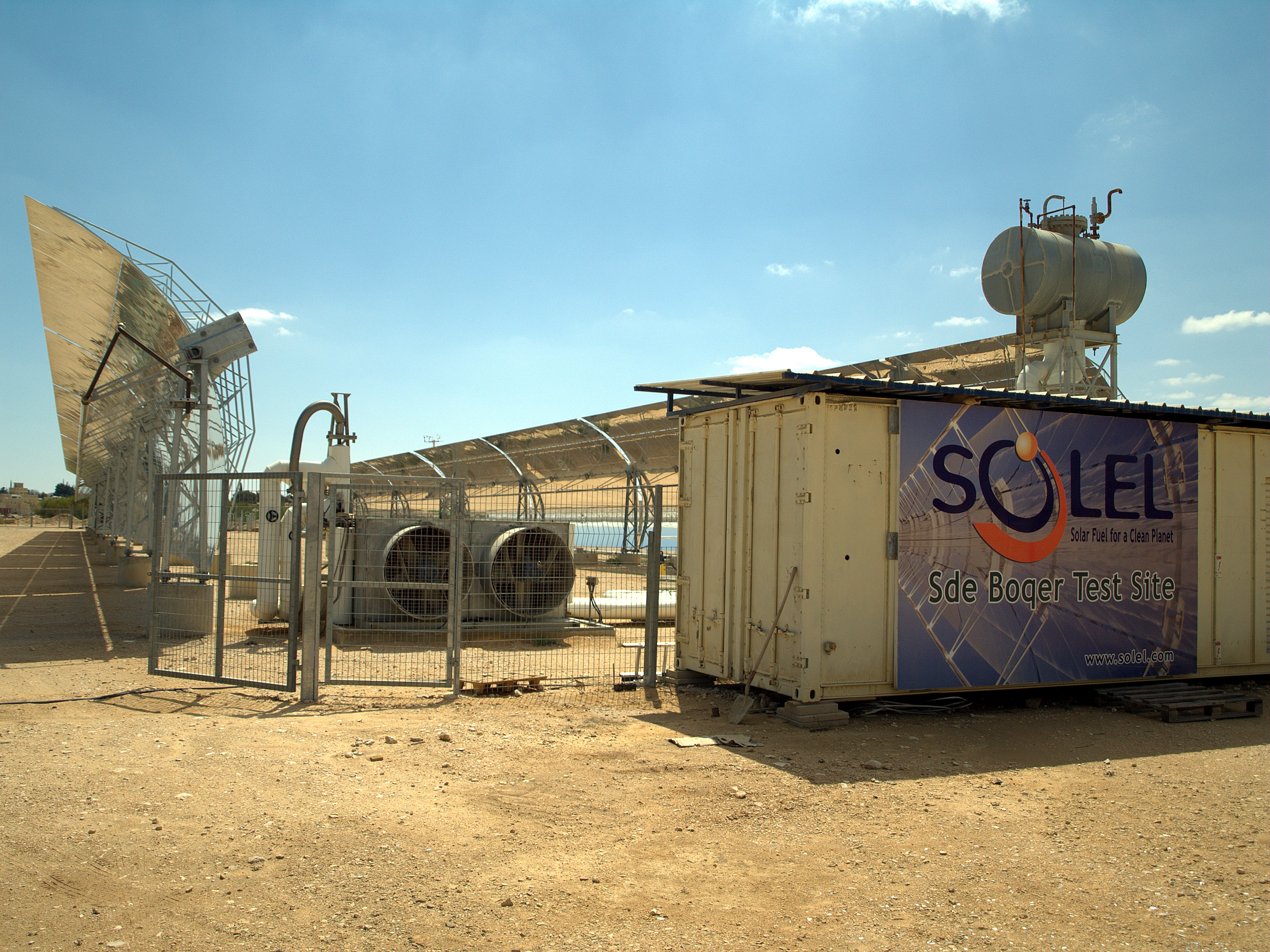
Sde Boker testing site

In 2007, Solel signed a contract with Pacific Gas & Electric to supply 553 MW from its planned Mojave Solar Park, California. The parabolic trough project was cancelled in 2011. In a joint venture with the Spanish Valoriza Energía, Solel planned a parabolic-trough plant in Spain. After three years of construction, one of originally three 50-MW units started operation in December 2011.

In October 2009, Siemens signed a $418-million contract to buy Solel Solar Systems. As part of the deal, Siemens committed itself to leave the company headquarters and some of its manufacturing facilities in Israel for at least five years.

Three years later, in an environment of plunging prices for photovoltaic power generation, Siemens announced plans to sell off the subsidiary, without success. In 2013, Siemens gave up its solar business.

== See also ==
- Solar power in Israel
