= Ne'ot Hovav =

Ne'ot Hovav נאות חובב
- Industrial council
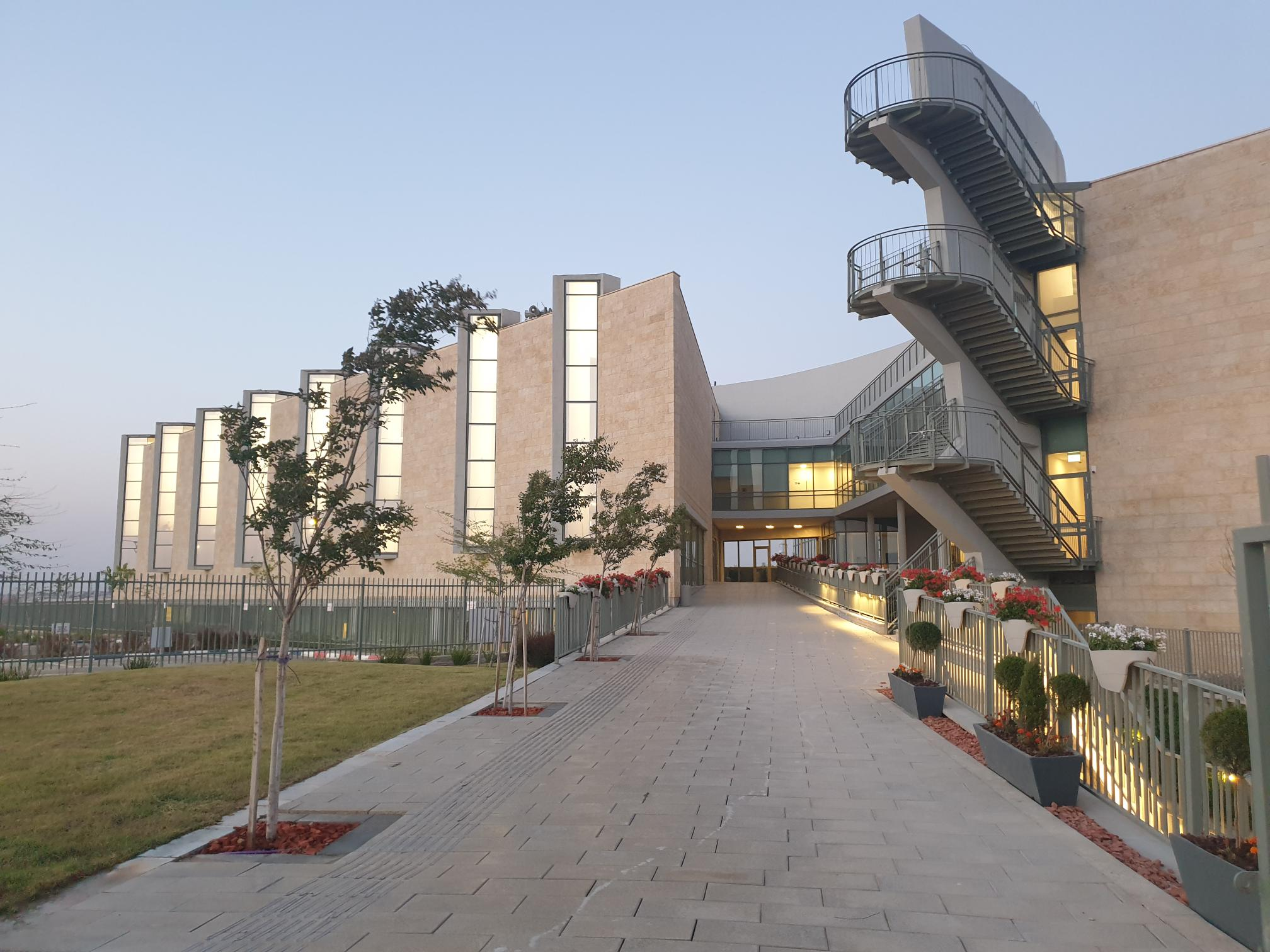
- Council's building

- Coat of arms

- Location within Northern Negev region of Israel Location within Israel
- Coordinates: 31°08′06″N 34°47′28″E
- Country: Israel
- District: Southern
- Subdistrict: Beersheba
- Founded: 1975

Ne'ot Hovav (Hebrew: נאות חובב, lit. 'Abodes of Hovav'), formerly Ramat Hovav, is an industrial zone in southern Israel and the site of Israel's main hazardous waste disposal facility. Ramat Hovav Industrial Zone is the locus of 19 chemical factories, including Adama Agricultural Solutions (former Makhteshim Agan), a pesticide plant; Teva Pharmaceutical Industries, a pharmaceuticals plant; Israel Chemicals, a bromine plant.

In July 2022, Erez Badash was appointed as the head of the local council.

On 29 March 2026, a chemical plant in Ne'ot Hovav was set on fire by a missile fragment during the 2026 Iran war.

== Environmental and health hazards ==
Many of the factories in Ramat Hovav use hazardous materials and evaporation ponds that pollute the air and leach cancer-causing chemicals into the soil and water. Initially, the toxic waste facility was privately run. According to Israeli environmentalist Alon Tal, the waste was not pretreated before transport to the site. Storage facilities were weak, barrels often rusted, toxic residues were unlabeled and reactive materials were stored near containers of cyanide. The facility was closed down repeatedly in the wake of accidents.

Ten years after its establishment, outcrops of the chalk under Ramat Hovav showed fractures potentially leading to serious soil and groundwater contamination in the future.

In 1997, when an explosion occurred in barrels storing organophosphorus pesticides, the residents of nearby villages were not warned and time passed before they were evacuated. In 2003, Physicians for Human Rights-Israel filed a suit petitioning the government to provide health services in the village. The same year, the Arab-Jewish environmental justice organization BUSTAN worked with local Bedouin leaders to construct a health clinic out of sustainable materials in order to highlight health concerns in the region. A year later, the government built a health clinic on the other side of the village.

In 1998, it cost about sixty-five dollars to hire a driver to dump a five-ton truck of waste in the West Bank but more than eleven thousand dollars to dispose of waste at Ramat Hovav. In 1999, al-Quds al-Arabi reported that Israeli companies were engaging in illegal dumping of toxic waste in the West Bank to avoid the cost of treatment and transport to Ramat Hovav.

A 2004 study commissioned by the Israeli Ministry of Health found a high rate of birth defects among children living in the vicinity.

In 2007, the head of the Ramat Hovav council, Giora Meyuhas, accused the government corporation that manages the site, the Environmental Services Company, of breaking the law and polluting the environment. Sarov said that the concentration of so many industries in one place means that if there is a large explosion, not simply local Negev residents but all of Israel and many of its Middle Eastern neighbors will suffer severe contamination akin to that of a nuclear explosion.

== Hazardous materials transport ==
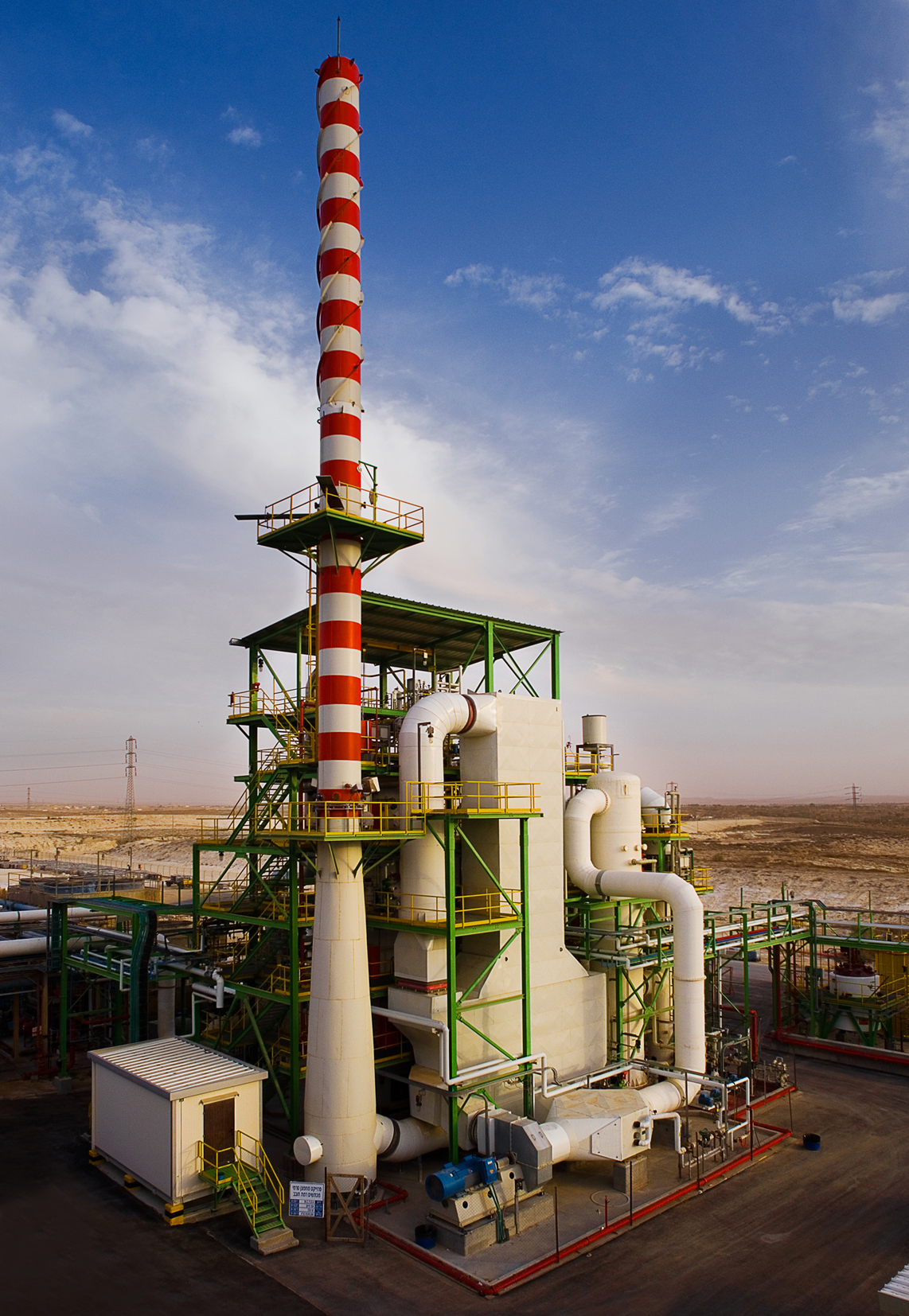
Loprox waste water treatment system, Ramat Hovav

The facility is accessed from Highway 40 and would eventually also be reachable via Highway 6, which is planned to be extended to the area. Much of the hazardous waste transported to the site from the rest of the country reaches it via an Israel Railways rail line (a branch off of the main line to Beersheba) that terminates at a freight rail terminal located inside the industrial zone. Before the branch line was completed in 2004, hazardous materials bound for Ramat Hovav were transloaded onto trucks at the Be'er Sheva North Railway Station, a fact that delayed the approval of new real estate development in the vicinity of Be'er Sheva North due to the risk of hazardous materials spills occurring during the transloading process.

== Solar park ==
In December 2014, the largest photovoltaic power plant of Israel's solar sector was inaugurated in Ramat Hovav, over the previously hazardous dumping site. The 37.5 MW project is owned by Energix Renewable Energies, and was Constructed by Belectric using CdTe photovoltaic modules based on thin-film technology, manufactured by U.S. company First Solar, making it the country's largest PV power plant and one of the largest of its kind in the Middle East.
