= David Faiman =

British and Israeli physicist (born 1944)

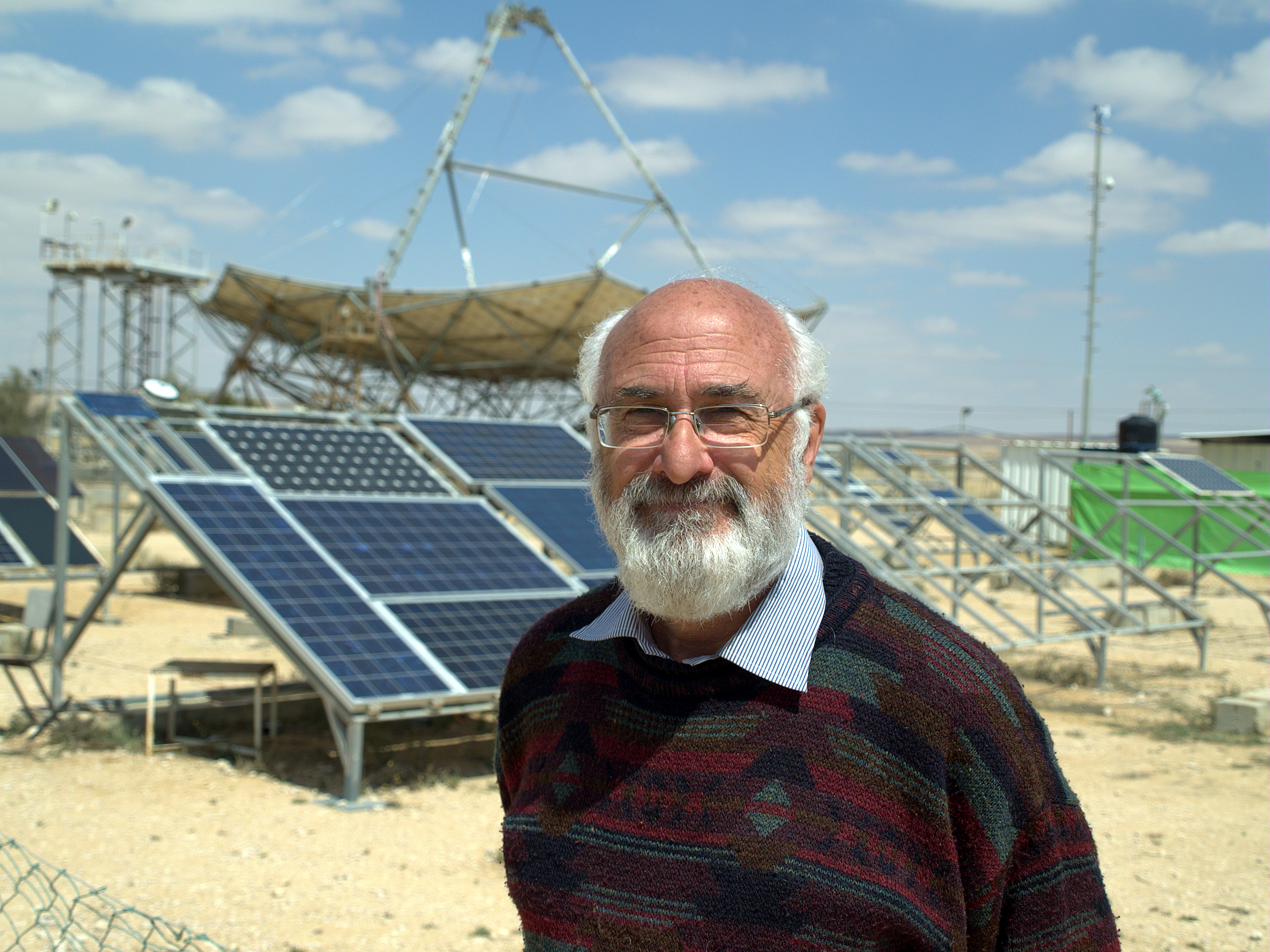
David Faiman in March 2009

David Faiman (Hebrew: דיוויד פיימן; born 1944 in the United Kingdom) is a British and Israeli physicist.

== Background ==
Faiman was educated at Willesden County Grammar School and the University of London, and received his PhD from the University of Illinois in 1969. After post-doctoral appointments in Oxford and CERN he arrived in Israel in September 1973, to take up an appointment in theoretical physics at the Weizmann Institute of Science. However, as a result of the energy crisis that followed the Yom Kippur War, he re-directed his research interests from elementary particles into solar energy. In 1976 he was recruited by Amos Richmond to assist in founding the Jacob Blaustein Institutes for Desert Research at the Sede Boqer campus of Ben-Gurion University of the Negev. Faiman created the Institutes’ Department of Solar Energy & Environmental Physics, which he headed concurrently with the Ben-Gurion National Solar Energy Center until his retirement in 2013 at the rank of professor emeritus. Faiman lives in Sede Boqer, Israel, in a passive solar house where almost all of the heating and cooling needs are taken care of by the sun. His hobbies include biblical geography, and the music of Giacomo Meyerbeer.

== Career ==
Faiman’s theoretical physics research focused on hadron spectroscopy using the quark model and various associated symmetries. His solar energy research spanned studies of solar radiation, energy conversion devices, and power-producing systems. His most celebrated work was the development, in collaboration with the Zenith Solar Company, of a 10 m2 mirrored, sun-tracking dish, which concentrated the sun’s rays 1,000 times onto a water-cooled solar array of dimensions 100 cm2. Under full sunshine, this system generated 2 kW of electric power and 5 kW of thermal power, the latter in the form of hot water at 80oC. Faiman was Israel’s representative on solar energy to UNESCO, the FAO and Tasks 2 and 8 of the International Energy Agency. Within the latter framework he co-authored the series of books Energy from the Desert.

== See also ==
- Solar power in Israel
