= Solar flower tower =

Hybrid power generator

AORA's Solar Flower Tower is a hybrid power generator that utilizes solar and alternative fuels, including diesel fuel, natural gas, liquefied natural gas, biogas, and other biofuels, to provide a constant green power source targeted for community-sized production. A module, dubbed the Solar Flower Tower because it looks like a golden yellow tulip, creates about 100 kW of electricity. The basis of the design is to use solar heated compressed air to spin a micro turbine. What makes the micro turbine unique is the efficiency of smaller power blocks, which allows small-scale construction, meaning simpler operation and less land needed.

== AORA ==
Formerly known as EDIG Solar, AORA is an Israeli based company that develops solar-hybrid power generators. The EDIG group of companies has contracted engineering project with organizations such as Ministry of Defense (Israel), El Al Israel Airlines, and the National Health Service Provider. EDIG presently has a relationship with the Weizmann Institute of Science, providing engineering services. It was at the Weizmann Institute of Science where the solar thermal technology was developed. After the technology was licensed to EDIG, continued advancement was developed until they decided to turn their new solar division into a sub-company, EDIG Solar, now known as AROA.

== How the tower works ==
In half an acre of land (about 40% of a football field), a solar tower module is surrounded by thirty heliostats reflecting the sun ray into a special solar receiver inside the module. The receiver heats the turbine's compressed air to about 1,000 °C, and the heated air is sent into the turbine's expander to create electricity.

== See also ==
- Active solar
- Solar energy
- Solar power
- Solar power in Israel
- Solar power tower
