= Suncore Photovoltaics =

American solar energy company

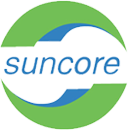
- Headquarters: Albuquerque, New Mexico, USA
- Products: Solar energy – CPV systems
- Website: www.suncoreus.com

Suncore Photovoltaic Technology Company Limited ("Suncore") is a solar energy company that specializes in concentrator photovoltaics (CPV), an emerging photovoltaic (PV) technology. The company manufactures, develops, and finances CPV systems for ground mounted applications. Its products include CPV solar power systems, receivers, trackers and turnkey service.

== History ==
Suncore Photovoltaics Technology Co, Ltd, was founded in 2010 as a joint-venture company by Chinese LED manufacturer San'an Optoelctronics Co, Ltd and U.S. semiconductor manufacturer EMCORE Corporation. In 2013, San’an became the sole owner of Suncore by purchasing stocks from Emcore.

In 2013 Suncore acquired Zenith Solar, the creator of a combined heat and power (CHP) technology which allows for the production of both electricity and hot water in a single system.

== Operations ==
Suncore's manufacturing capacity is around 300 megawatts (MW) with its manufacturing facility of over 2,000,000 square feet (190,000 m^{2}) in China. Suncore has a portfolio of 120 MW of CPV systems deployed worldwide, including the largest CPV power plant in Golmud, China.
