= Photovoltaic system =

Power system designed to supply usable electric power from solar energy

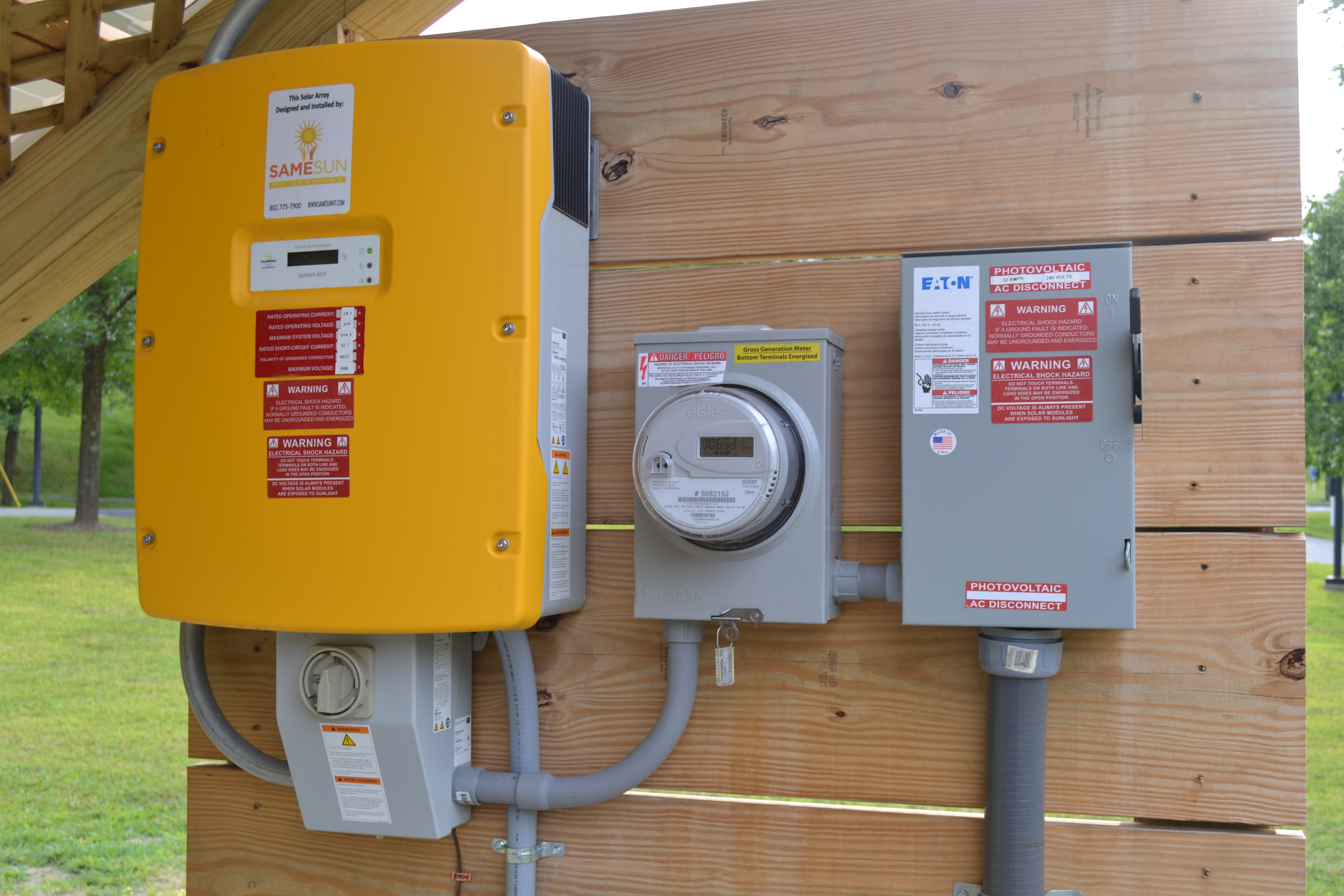
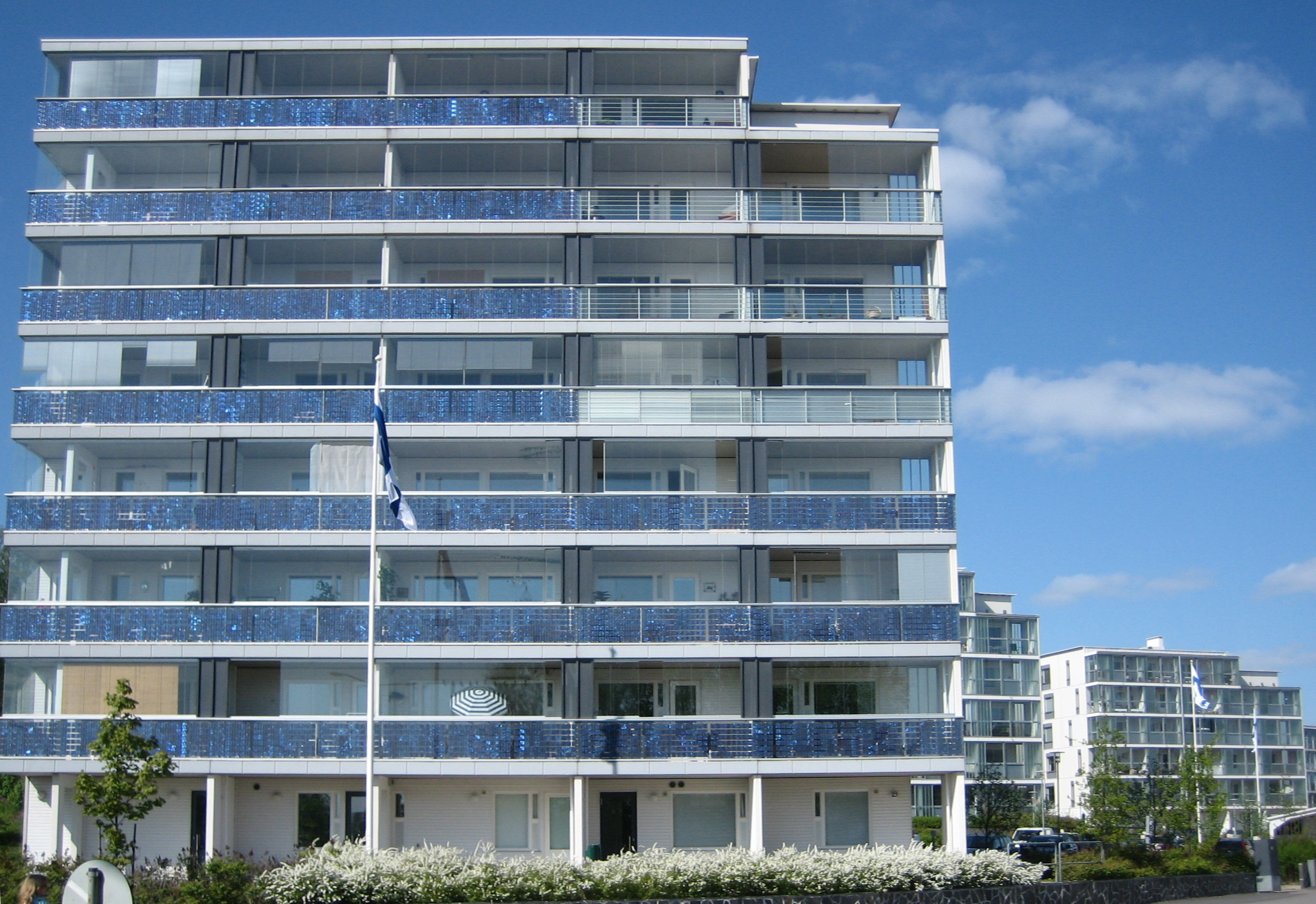
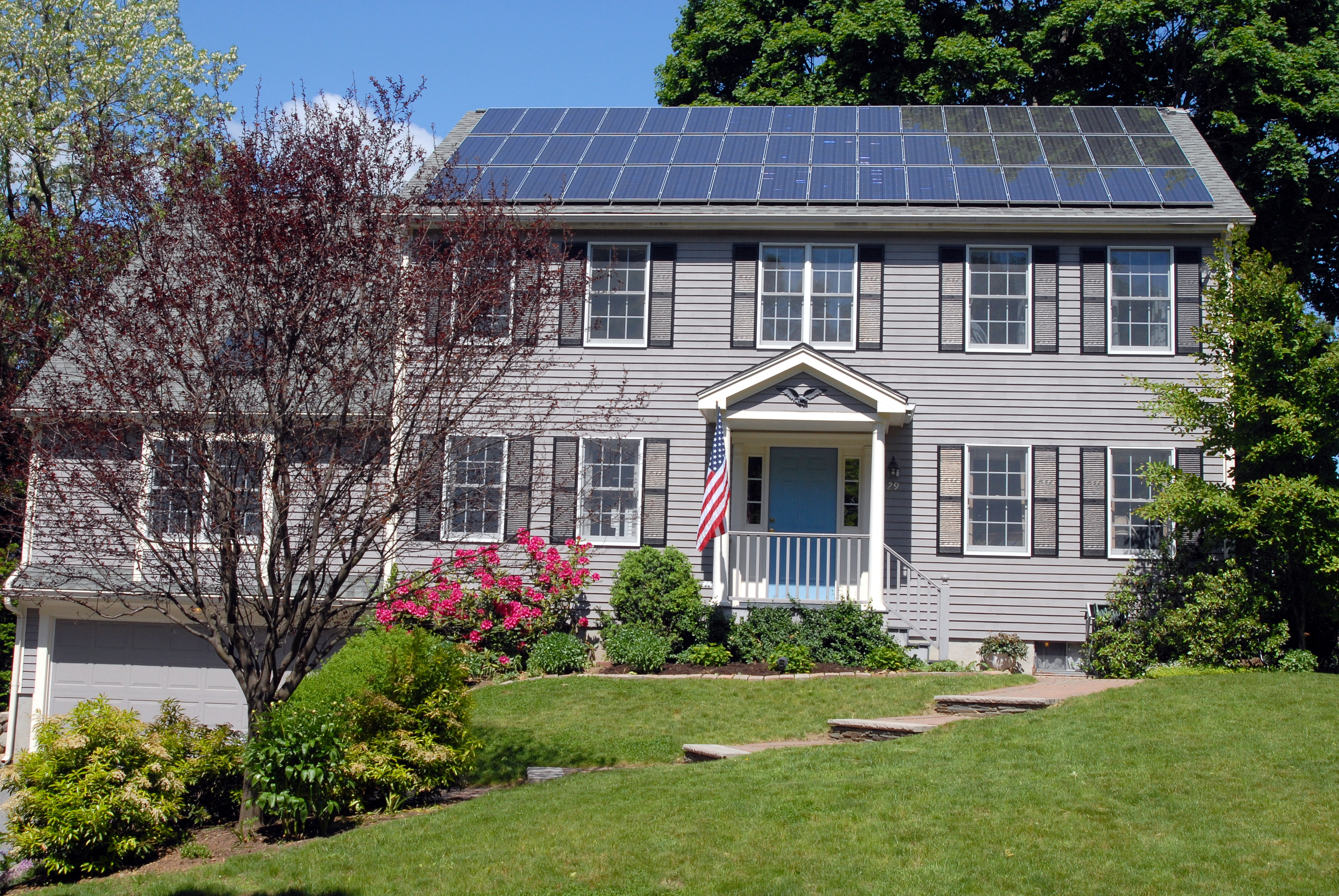
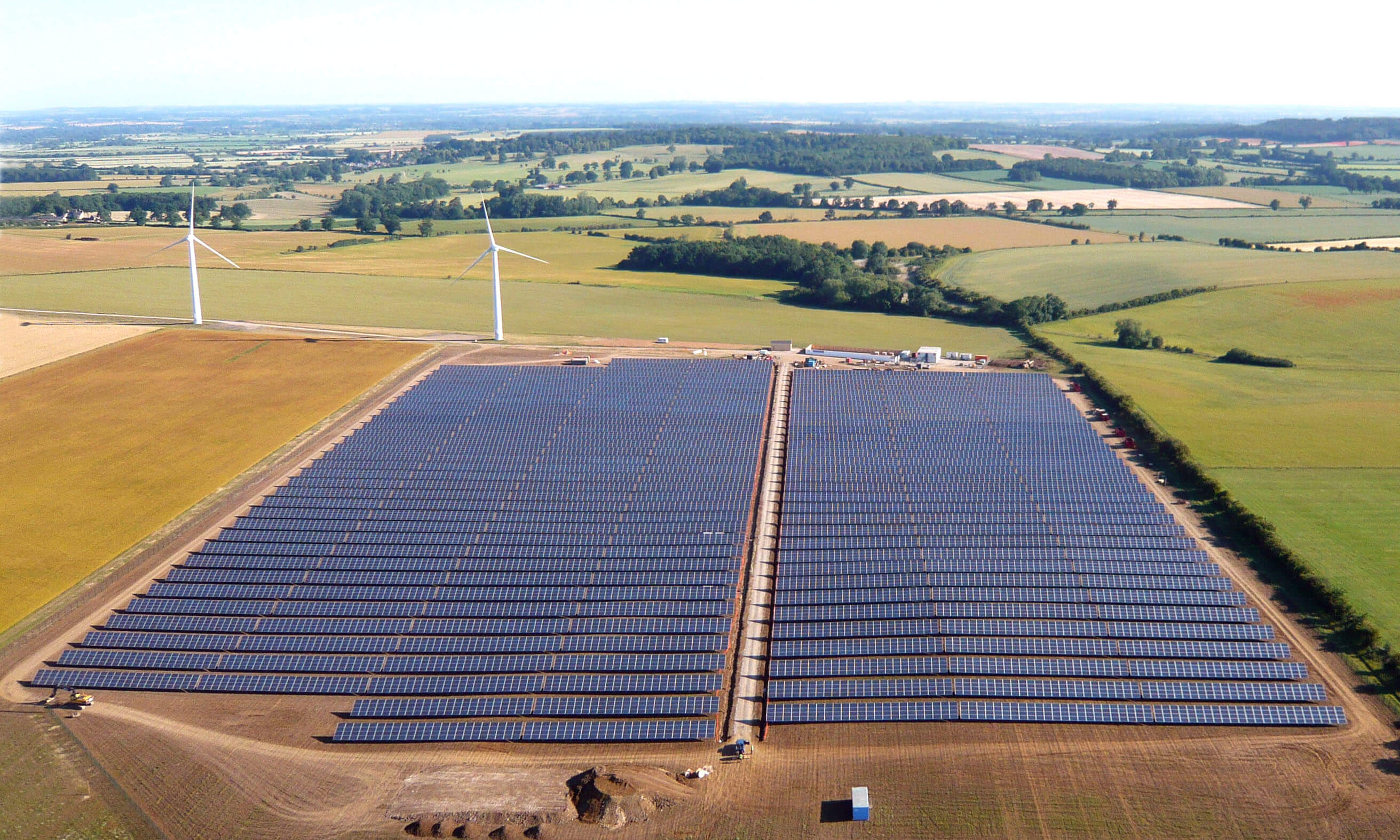
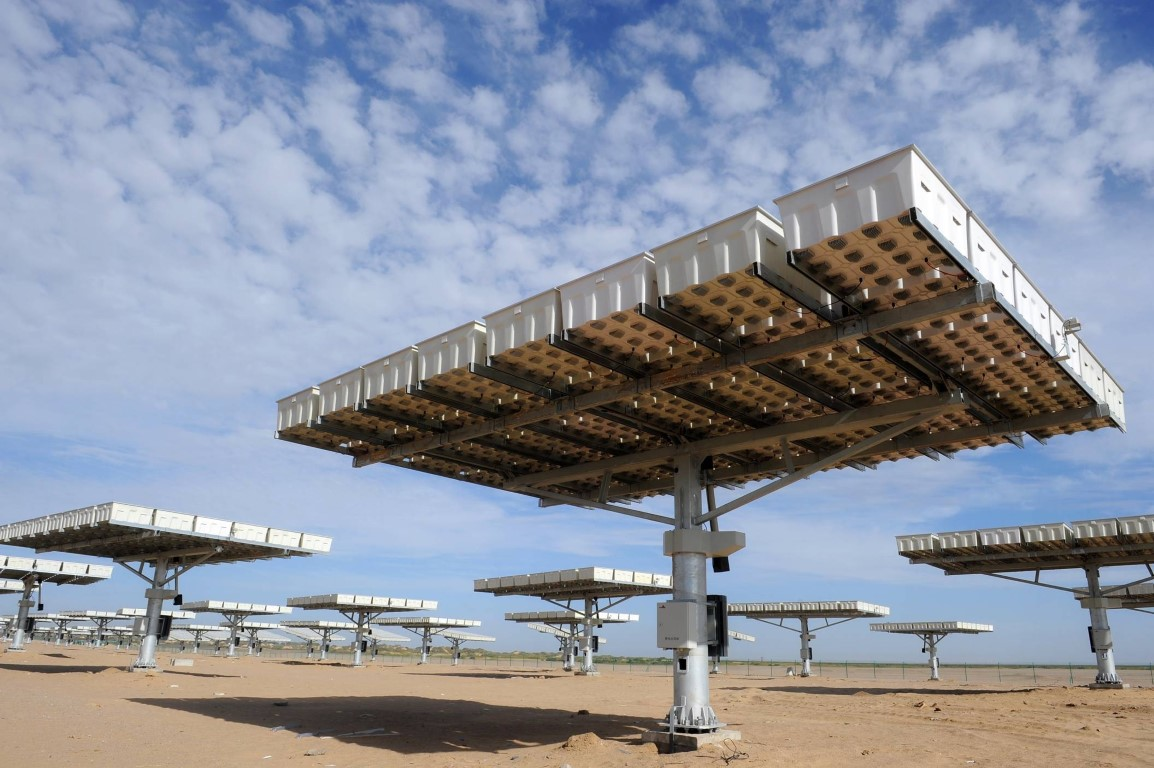
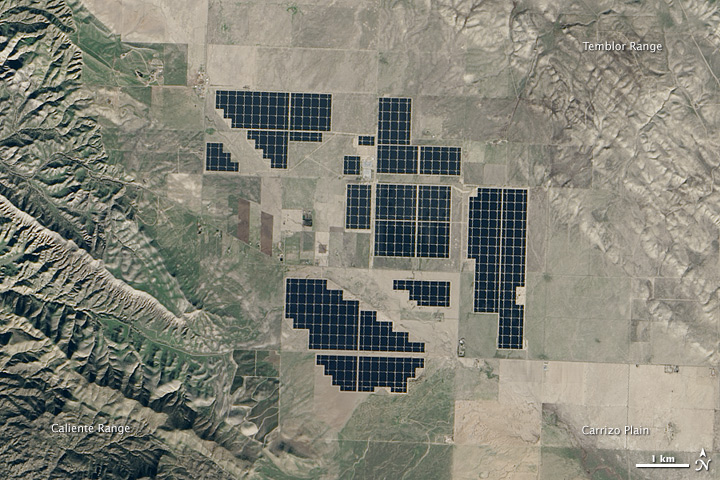
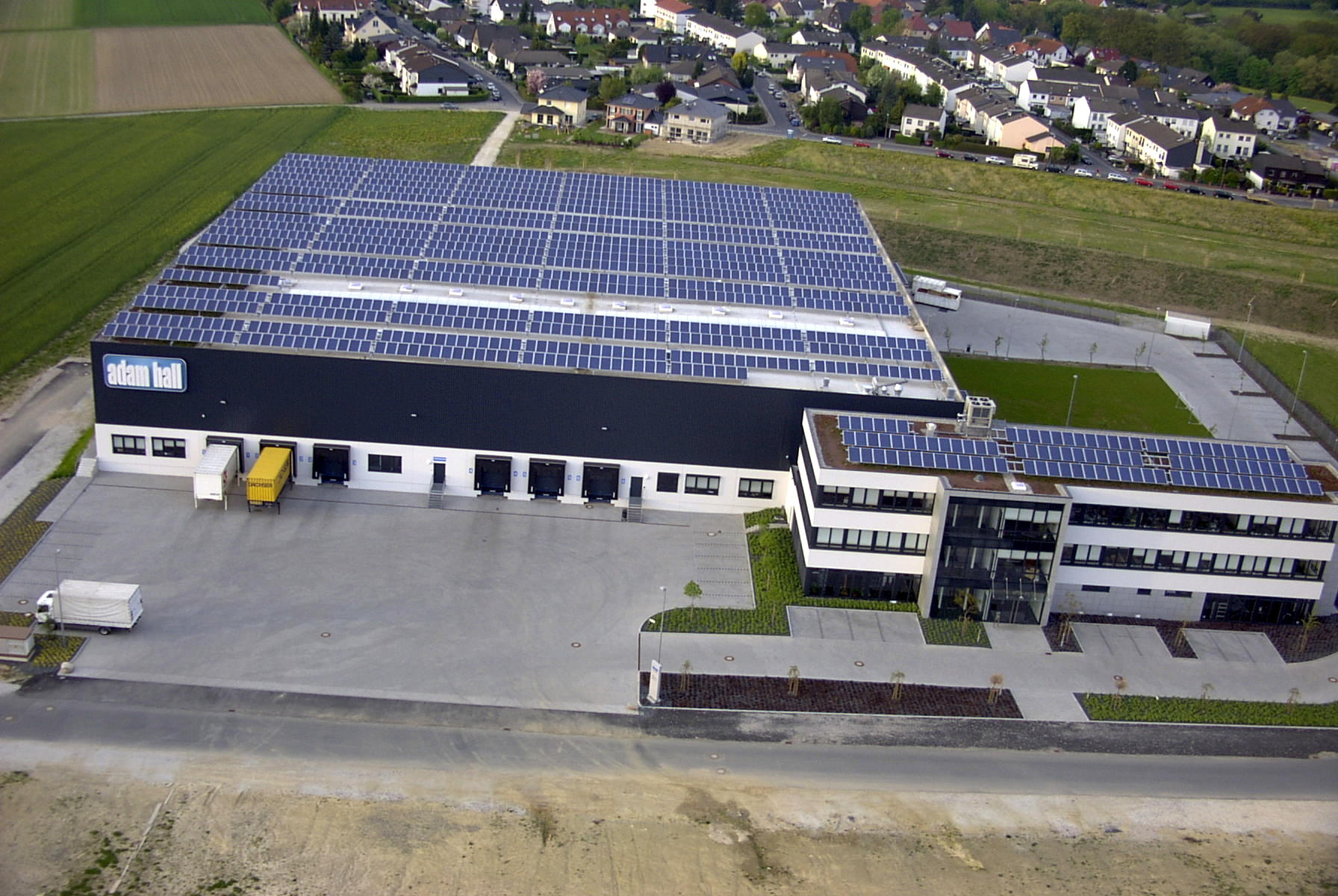
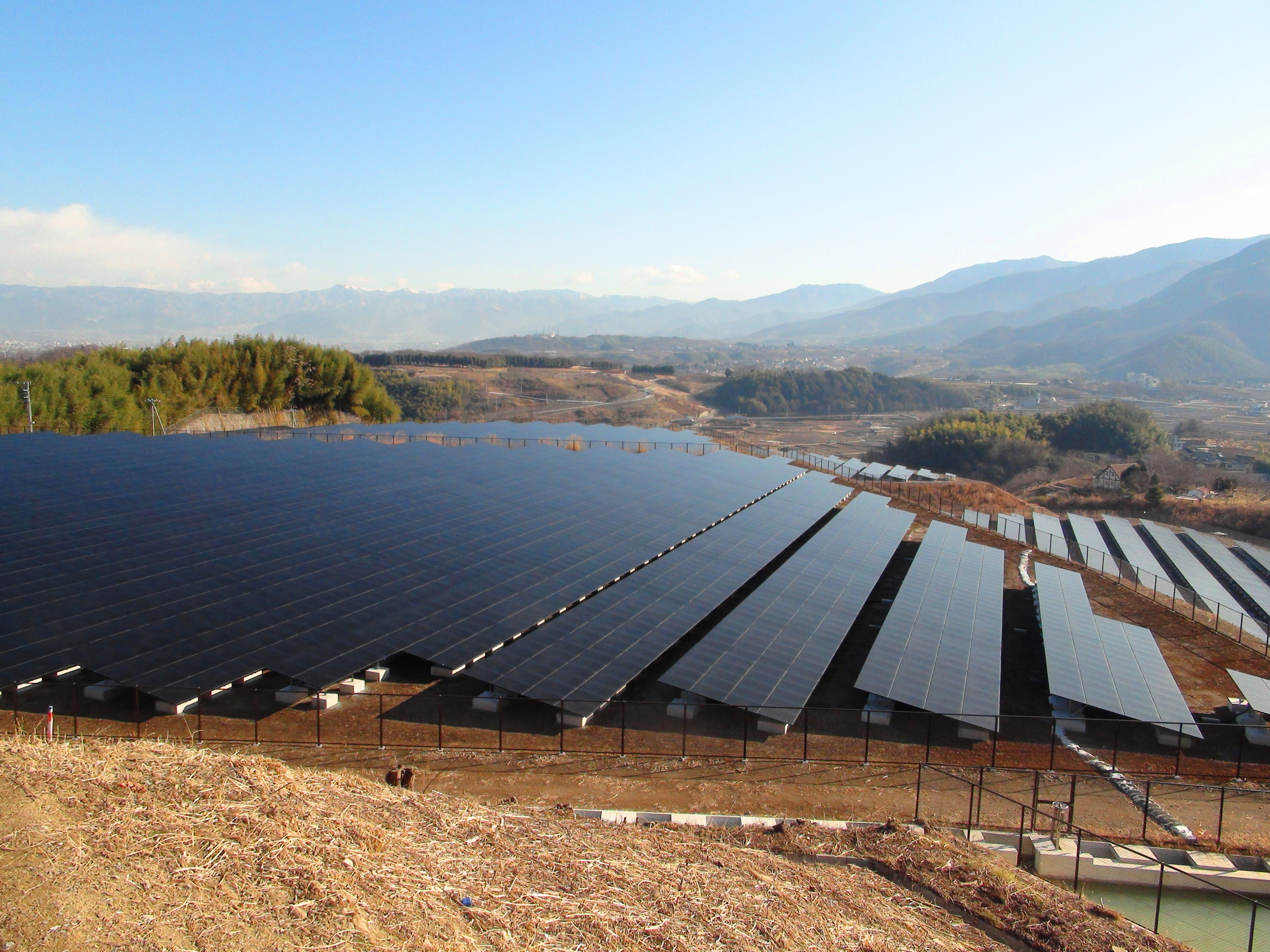
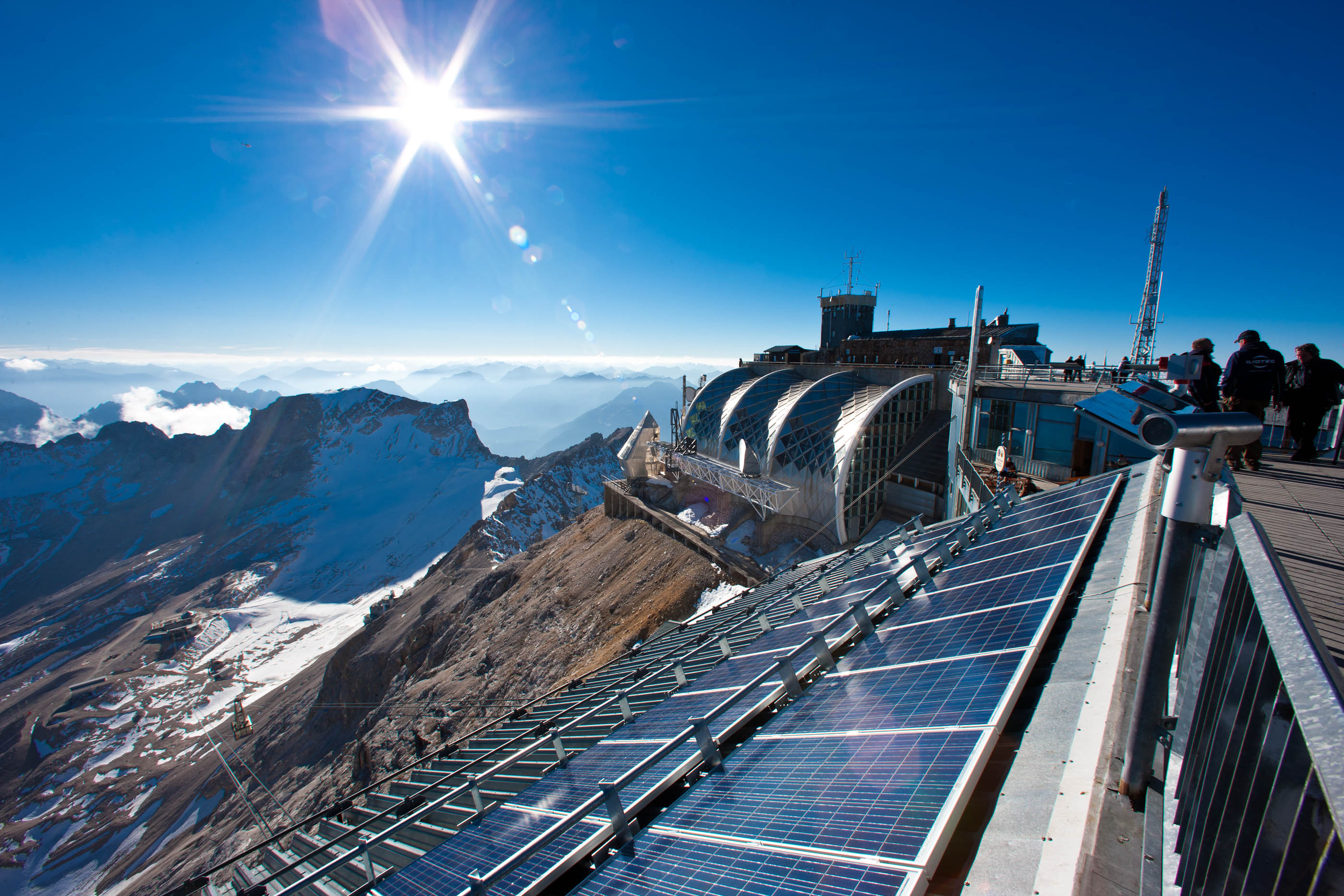
Photovoltaic power systems and components:
- Solar string inverter and other BOS components
- BIPV on balcony in Helsinki, Finland
- Rooftop system in Boston, United States
- Westmill solar park in the United Kingdom
- Dual axis tracker with CPV modules
- Topaz, one of the world's largest solar power station, as seen from space
- Commercial rooftop PV system of about 400 kW_{p}
- Power plant on Mt. Komekura, Japan
- Solar PV system on Zugspitze, Germany's highest mountain-top

A photovoltaic system, also called a PV system or solar power system, is an electric power system designed to supply usable solar power by means of photovoltaics. It consists of an arrangement of several components, which include solar panels to absorb and convert sunlight into electricity, a solar inverter to convert the output from direct to alternating current, as well as mounting, cabling, and other electrical accessories to set up a working system. Many utility-scale PV systems use tracking systems that follow the sun's daily path across the sky to generate more electricity than fixed-mounted systems.

Photovoltaic systems convert light directly into electricity and are not to be confused with other solar technologies, such as concentrated solar power or solar thermal, used for heating and cooling. A solar array only encompasses the solar panels, the visible part of the PV system, and does not include all the other hardware, often summarized as the balance of system (BOS). PV systems range from small, rooftop-mounted or building-integrated systems with capacities ranging from a few to several tens of kilowatts to large, utility-scale power stations of hundreds of megawatts. Nowadays, off-grid or stand-alone systems account for a small portion of the market.

Operating silently and without any moving parts or air pollution, PV systems have evolved from niche market applications into a mature technology used for mainstream electricity generation. Due to the growth of photovoltaics, prices for PV systems have rapidly declined since their introduction; however, they vary by market and the size of the system. Nowadays, solar PV modules account for less than half of the system's overall cost, leaving the rest to the remaining BOS components and to soft costs, which include customer acquisition, permitting, inspection and interconnection, installation labor, and financing costs.

== Modern system ==
=== Overview ===
Diagram of the possible components of a photovoltaic system

A photovoltaic system converts the Sun's radiation, in the form of light, into usable electricity. It comprises the solar array and the balance of system components. PV systems can be categorized by various aspects, such as, grid-connected vs. stand alone systems, building-integrated vs. rack-mounted systems, residential vs. utility systems, distributed vs. centralized systems, rooftop vs. ground-mounted systems, tracking vs. fixed-tilt systems, and new constructed vs. retrofitted systems. Other distinctions may include, systems with microinverters vs. central inverter, systems using crystalline silicon vs. thin-film technology, and systems with modules.

About 99 percent of all European and 90 percent of all US solar power systems are connected to the electrical grid, while off-grid systems are somewhat more common in Australia and South Korea. PV systems rarely use battery storage. This may change, as government incentives for distributed energy storage are implemented and investments in storage solutions gradually become economically viable for small systems. In the UK, the number of commercial systems using battery storage is gradually increasing as a result of grid constraints preventing feedback of unused electricity into the grid as well as increased electricity costs resulting in improved economics. A typical residential solar array is rack-mounted on the roof, rather than integrated into the roof or facade of the building, which is significantly more expensive. Utility-scale solar power stations are ground-mounted, with fixed tilted solar panels rather than using expensive tracking devices. Crystalline silicon is the predominant material used in 90 percent of worldwide produced solar modules, while its rival thin-film has lost market-share. About 70 percent of all solar cells and modules are produced in China and Taiwan, only 5 percent by European and US manufacturers. The installed capacity for both small rooftop systems and large solar power stations is growing rapidly and in equal parts, although there is a notable trend towards utility-scale systems, as the focus on new installations is shifting away from Europe to sunnier regions, such as the Sunbelt in the US, which are less opposed to ground-mounted solar farms and cost-effectiveness is more emphasized by investors.

Driven by advances in technology and increases in manufacturing scale and sophistication, the cost of photovoltaics is declining continuously. There are several million PV systems distributed all over the world, mostly in Europe, with 1.4 million systems in Germany alone – as well as North America with 440,000 systems in the United States. The energy conversion efficiency of a conventional solar module increased from 15 to 20 percent since 2004 and a PV system recoups the energy needed for its manufacture in about 2 years. In exceptionally irradiated locations, or when thin-film technology is used, the so-called energy payback time decreases to one year or less. Net metering and financial incentives, such as preferential feed-in tariffs for solar-generated electricity, have also greatly supported installations of PV systems in many countries. The levelised cost of electricity from large-scale PV systems has become competitive with conventional electricity sources in an expanding list of geographic regions, and grid parity has been achieved in about 30 countries.

As of 2015, the fast-growing global PV market is rapidly approaching the 200 GW mark – about 40 times the installed capacity in 2006. These systems currently contribute about 1 percent to worldwide electricity generation. Top installers of PV systems in terms of capacity are currently China, Japan and the United States, while half of the world's capacity is installed in Europe, with Germany and Italy supplying 7–8% of their respective domestic electricity consumption with solar PV. The International Energy Agency expects solar power to become the world's largest source of electricity by 2050, with solar photovoltaics and concentrated solar thermal contributing 16% and 11% to the global demand, respectively.

=== Solar grid-connection ===
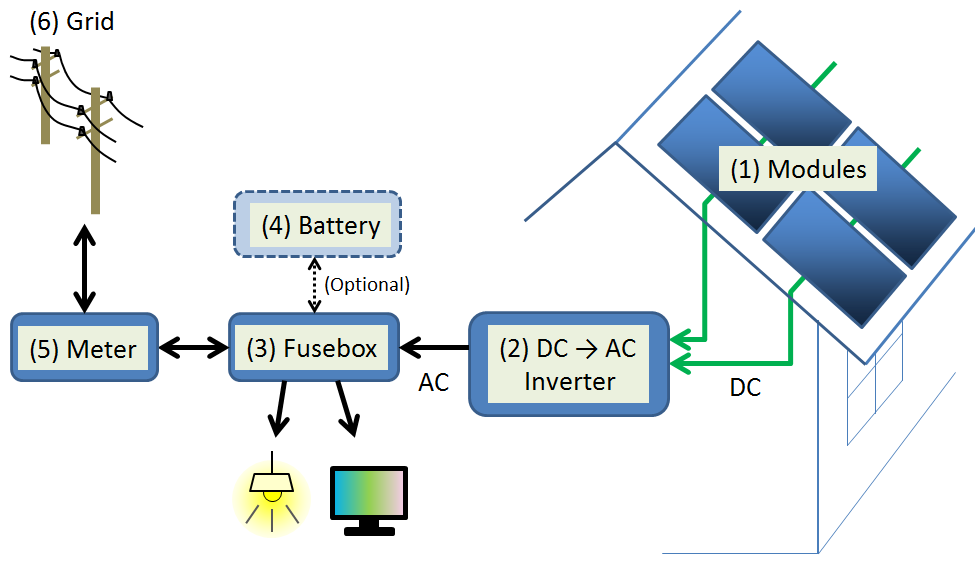
Schematics of an AC coupled residential PV system

A grid connected system is connected to a larger independent grid (typically the public electricity grid) and feeds energy directly into the grid. This energy may be shared by a residential or commercial building before or after the revenue measurement point, depending on whether the credited energy production is calculated independently of the customer's energy consumption (feed-in tariff) or only on the difference of energy (net metering). These systems vary in size from residential (2–10 kW_{p}) to solar power stations (up to tens of MW_{p}). This is a form of decentralized electricity generation. Feeding electricity into the grid requires the transformation of DC into AC by a special, synchronizing grid-tie inverter. In kilowatt-sized installations the DC side system voltage is as high as permitted (typically 1000 V except US residential 600 V) to limit ohmic losses. Most modules (60 or 72 crystalline silicon cells) generate 160 W to 300 W at 36 volts. It is sometimes necessary or desirable to connect the modules partially in parallel rather than all in series. An individual set of modules connected in series is known as a 'string'. A set of series-connected "strings" is known as an "array".

=== Scale of system ===
Photovoltaic systems are generally categorized into three distinct market segments: residential rooftop, commercial rooftop, and ground-mount utility-scale systems. Their capacities range from a few kilowatts to hundreds of megawatts. A typical residential system is around 10 kilowatts and mounted on a sloped roof, while commercial systems may reach a megawatt-scale and are generally installed on low-slope or even flat roofs. Although rooftop mounted systems are small and have a higher cost per watt than large utility-scale installations, they account for the largest share in the market. There is, however, a growing trend towards bigger utility-scale power plants, especially in the "sunbelt" region of the planet.

==== Utility-scale ====
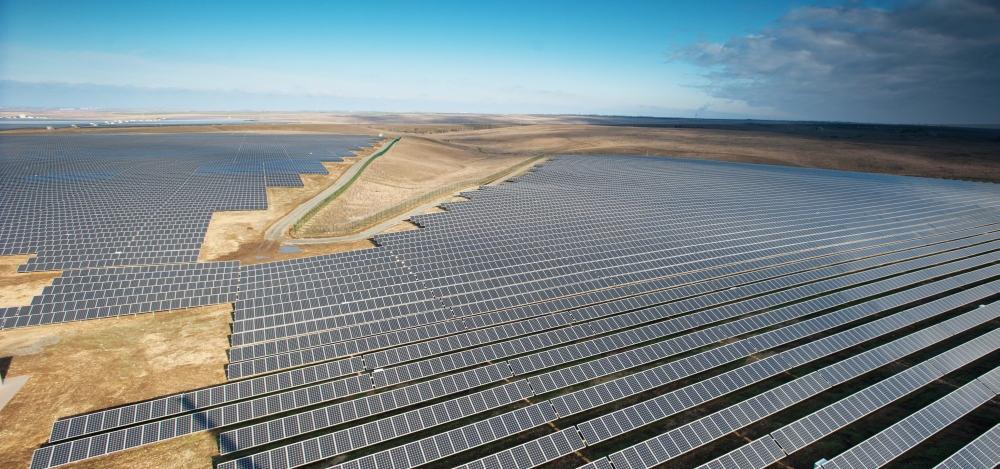
Perovo Solar Park in Ukraine

Large utility-scale solar parks or farms are power stations and capable of providing an energy supply to large numbers of consumers. Generated electricity is fed into the transmission grid powered by central generation plants (grid-connected or grid-tied plant), or combined with one, or many, domestic electricity generators to feed into a small electrical grid (hybrid plant). In rare cases generated electricity is stored or used directly by island/standalone plant. PV systems are generally designed in order to ensure the highest energy yield for a given investment. Some large photovoltaic power stations such as Solar Star, Waldpolenz Solar Park and Topaz Solar Farm cover tens or hundreds of hectares and have power outputs up to hundreds of megawatts.

==== Rooftop, mobile, and portable ====
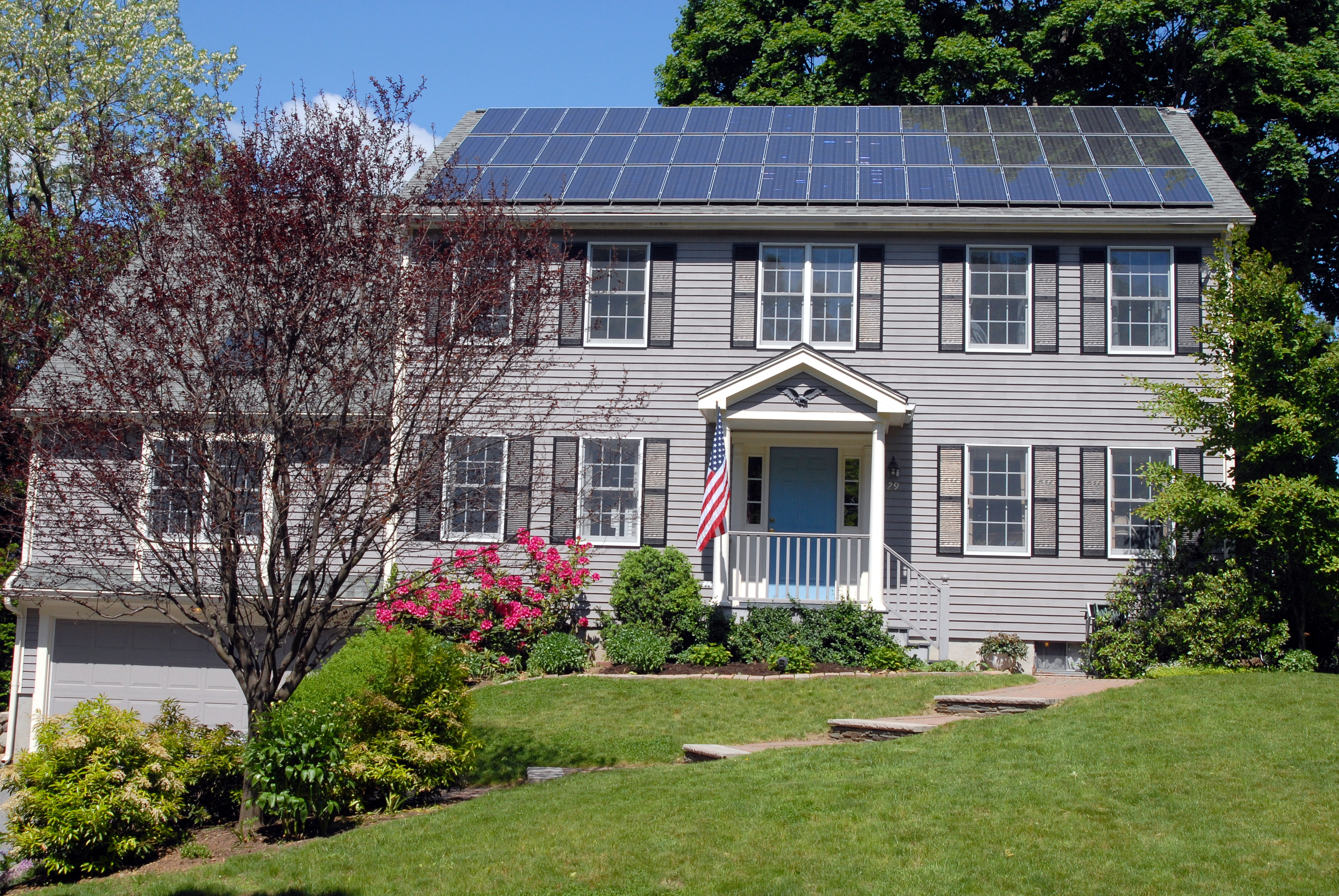
Rooftop system near Boston, US

A small PV system is capable of providing enough AC electricity to power a single home, or an isolated device in the form of AC or DC electric. Military and civilian Earth observation satellites, street lights, construction and traffic signs, electric cars, solar-powered tents, and electric aircraft may contain integrated photovoltaic systems to provide a primary or auxiliary power source in the form of AC or DC power, depending on the design and power demands. In 2013, rooftop systems accounted for 60 percent of worldwide installations. However, there is a trend away from rooftop and towards utility-scale PV systems, as the focus of new PV installations is also shifting from Europe to countries in the sunbelt region of the planet where opposition to ground-mounted solar farms is less accentuated. Portable and mobile PV systems provide electrical power independent of utility connections, for "off the grid" operation. Such systems are so commonly used on recreational vehicles and boats that there are retailers specializing in these applications and products specifically targeted to them. Since recreational vehicles (RV) normally carry batteries and operate lighting and other systems on nominally 12-volt DC power, RV systems normally operate in a voltage range that can charge 12-volt batteries directly, so addition of a PV system requires only panels, a charge controller, and wiring. Solar systems on recreation vehicles are usually constrained in wattage by the physical size of the RV's roof space.

==== Building-integrated ====
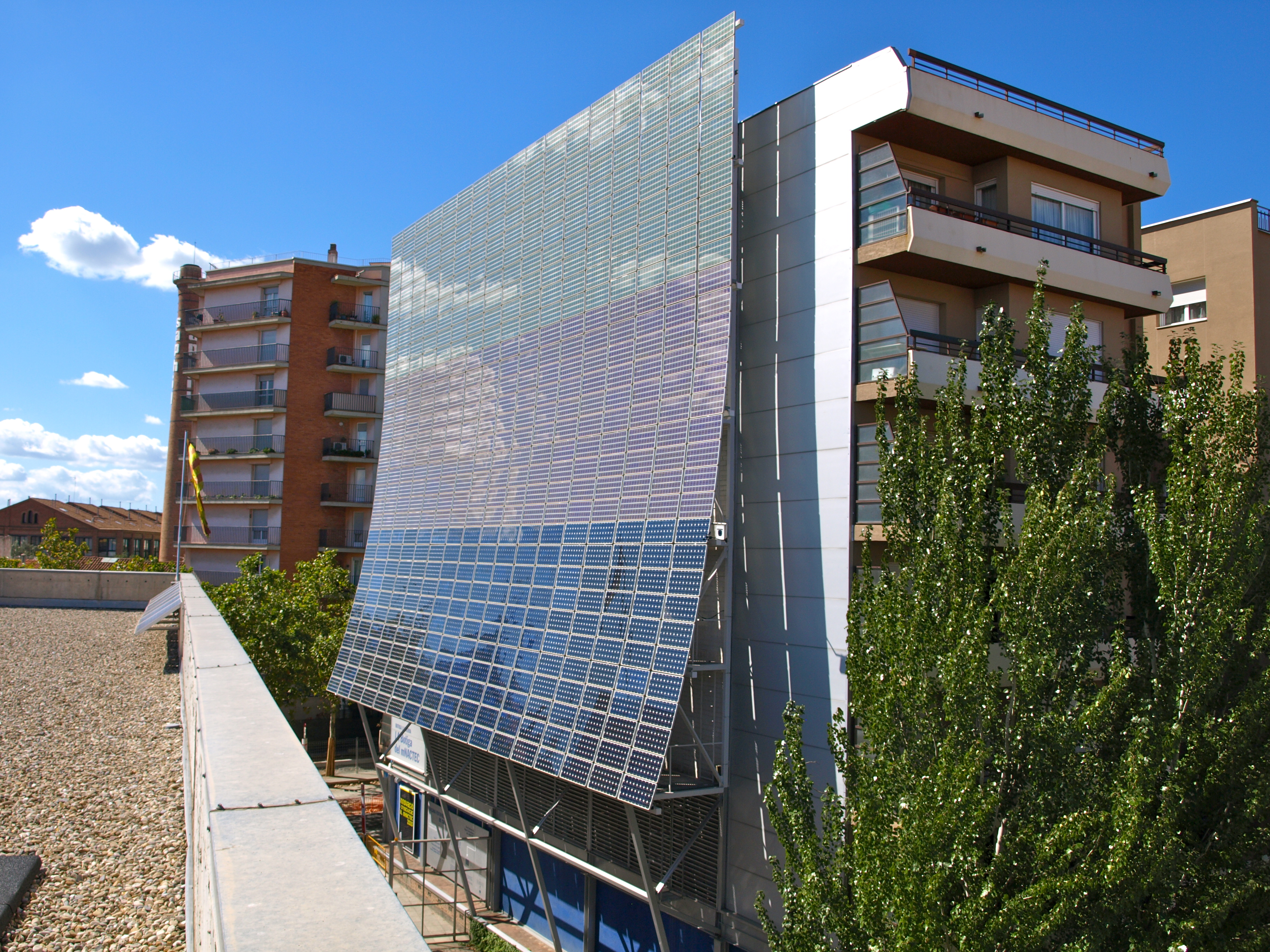
BAPV wall near Barcelona, Spain

In urban and suburban areas, photovoltaic arrays are often used on rooftops to supplement power use; often the building will have a connection to the power grid, in which case the energy produced by the PV array can be sold back to the utility in some sort of net metering agreement. Some utilities use the rooftops of commercial customers and telephone poles to support their use of PV panels. Solar trees are arrays that, as the name implies, mimic the look of trees, provide shade, and at night can function as street lights.

=== Performance ===
Uncertainties in revenue over time relate mostly to the evaluation of the solar resource and to the performance of the system itself. In the best of cases, uncertainties are typically 4% for year-to-year climate variability, 5% for solar resource estimation (in a horizontal plane), 3% for estimation of irradiation in the plane of the array, 3% for power rating of modules, 2% for losses due to dirt and soiling, 1.5% for losses due to snow, and 5% for other sources of error. Identifying and reacting to manageable losses is critical for revenue and O&M efficiency. Monitoring of array performance may be part of contractual agreements between the array owner, the builder, and the utility purchasing the energy produced. A method to create "synthetic days" using readily available weather data and verification using the Open Solar Outdoors Test Field make it possible to predict photovoltaic systems performance with high degrees of accuracy. This method can be used to then determine loss mechanisms on a local scale – such as those from snow or the effects of surface coatings (e.g. hydrophobic or hydrophilic) on soiling or snow losses. (Although in heavy snow environments with severe ground interference can result in annual losses from snow of 30%.) Access to the Internet has allowed a further improvement in energy monitoring and communication. Dedicated systems are available from a number of vendors. For solar PV systems that use microinverters (panel-level DC to AC conversion), module power data is automatically provided. Some systems allow setting performance alerts that trigger phone/email/text warnings when limits are reached. These solutions provide data for the system owner and the installer. Installers are able to remotely monitor multiple installations, and see at-a-glance the status of their entire installed base.

== Components ==
The balance of system components of a PV system (BOS) balance the power-generating subsystem of the solar array (left side) with the power-using side of the AC-household devices and the utility grid (right side).

A photovoltaic system for residential, commercial, or industrial energy supply consists of the solar array and a number of components often summarized as the balance of system (BOS). This term is synonymous with "Balance of plant" q.v. BOS-components include power-conditioning equipment and structures for mounting, typically one or more DC to AC power converters, also known as inverters, an energy storage device, a racking system that supports the solar array, electrical wiring and interconnections, and mounting for other components.

Optionally, a balance of system may include any or all of the following: renewable energy credit revenue-grade meter, maximum power point tracker (MPPT), battery system and charger, GNSS solar tracker, energy management software, solar irradiance sensors, anemometer, or task-specific accessories designed to meet specialized requirements for a system owner. In addition, a CPV system requires optical lenses or mirrors and sometimes a cooling system.

The terms "solar array" and "PV system" are often incorrectly used interchangeably, despite the fact that the solar array does not encompass the entire system. Moreover, "solar panel" is often used as a synonym for "solar module", although a panel consists of a string of several modules. The term "solar system" is also an often used misnomer for a PV system.

=== Solar array ===
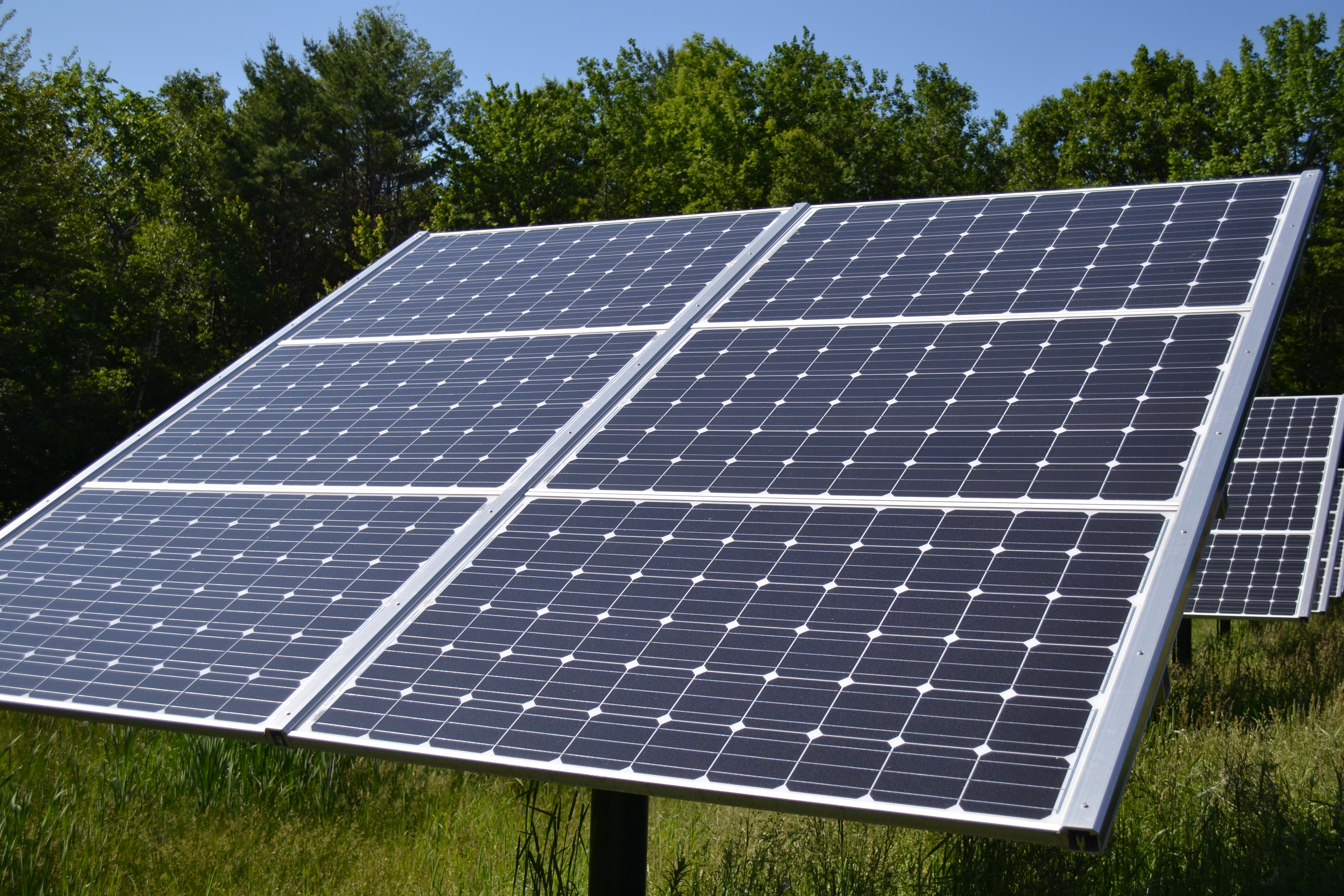
Fixed tilt solar array in of crystalline silicon panels in Canterbury, New Hampshire, United States

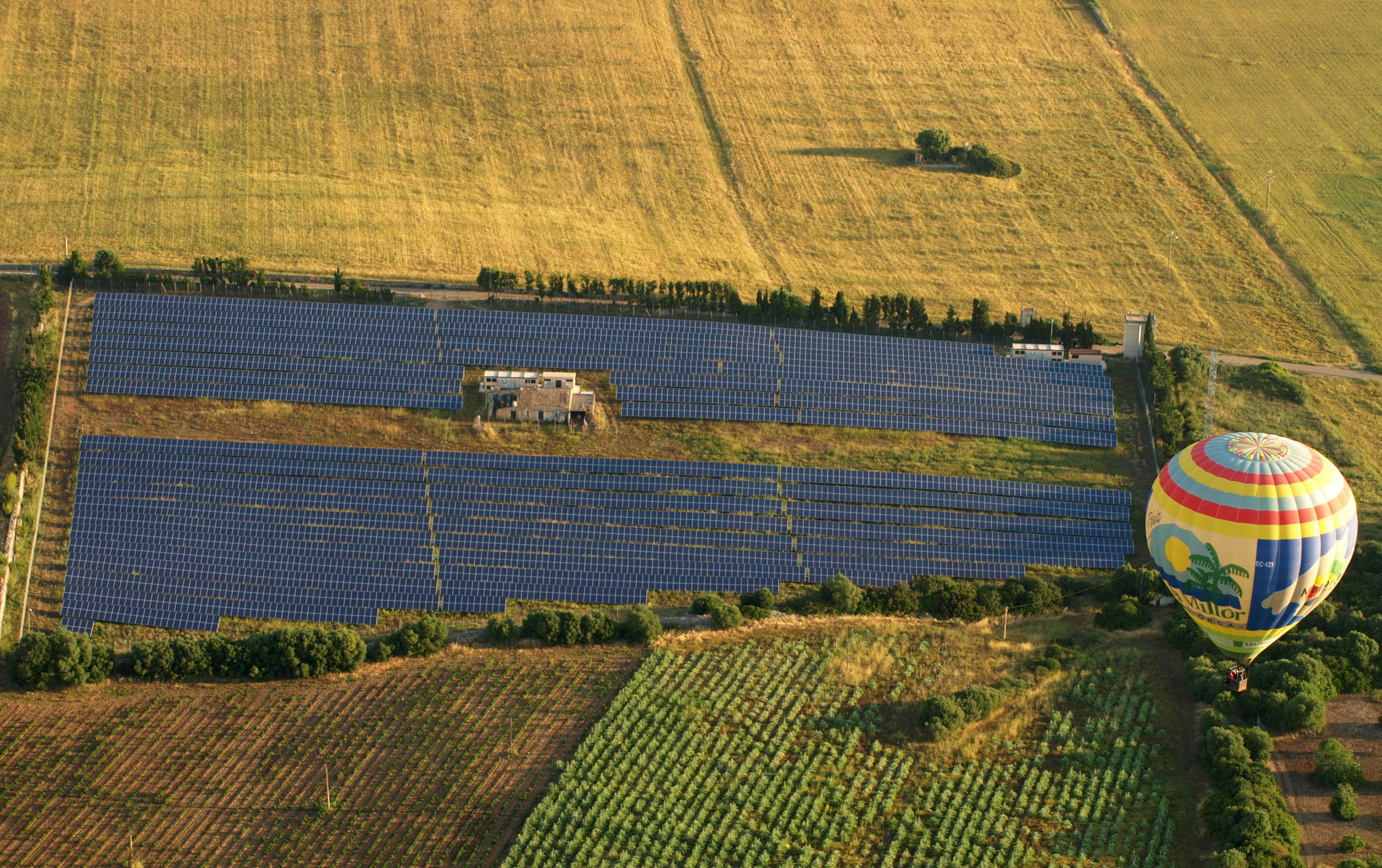
Solar array of a solar farm with a few thousand solar modules on the island of Mallorca, Spain

The building blocks of a photovoltaic system are solar cells. A solar cell is the electrical device that can directly convert photons energy into electricity. There are three technological generations of solar cells: the first generation (1G) of crystalline silicon cells (c-Si), the second generation (2G) of thin-film cells (such as CdTe, CIGS, Amorphous Silicon, and GaAs), and the third generation (3G) of organic, dye-sensitized, Perovskite and multijunction cells.

Conventional c-Si solar cells, normally wired in series, are encapsulated in a solar module to protect them from the weather. The module consists of a tempered glass as cover, a soft and flexible encapsulant, a rear backsheet made of a weathering and fire-resistant material and an aluminium frame around the outer edge. Electrically connected and mounted on a supporting structure, solar modules build a string of modules, often called solar panel. A solar array consists of one or many such panels. A photovoltaic array, or solar array, is a linked collection of solar modules. The power that one module can produce is seldom enough to meet requirements of a home or a business, so the modules are linked together to form an array. Most PV arrays use an inverter to convert the DC power produced by the modules into alternating current that can power lights, motors, and other loads. The modules in a PV array are usually first connected in series to obtain the desired voltage; the individual strings are then connected in parallel to allow the system to produce more current. Solar panels are typically measured under STC (standard test conditions) or PTC (PVUSA test conditions), in watts. Typical panel ratings range from less than 100 watts to over 400 watts. The array rating consists of a summation of the panel ratings, in watts, kilowatts, or megawatts.

==== Modules and efficiency ====
A typical 150 watt PV module is about a square meter in size. Such a module may be expected to produce 0.75 kilowatt-hour (kWh) every day, on average, after taking into account the weather and the latitude, for an insolation of 5 sun hours/day. Module output degrades faster at increased temperature. Allowing ambient air to flow over, and if possible behind, PV modules reduces this problem, as the airflow tend to reduce the operating temperature and, as consequence, increase the module efficiency. However, it was recently demonstrated that, in the real-world operation, considering a larger scale photovoltaic generator, increase in wind speed can increase the energy losses, following the fluid mechanics theory, as the wind interaction with the PV generator induces air flux variations that modify the heat transfer from the modules to the air.

Effective module lives are typically 25 years or more. The payback period for an investment in a PV solar installation varies greatly and is typically less useful than a calculation of return on investment. While it is typically calculated to be between 10 and 20 years, the financial payback period can be far shorter with incentives.

The temperature effect on photovoltaic modules is usually quantified by means of some coefficients relating the variations of the open‐circuit voltage, of the short‐circuit current, and of the maximum power to temperature changes. In this paper, comprehensive experimental guidelines to estimate the temperature coefficients.

Due to the low voltage of an individual solar cell (typically ca. 0.5V), several cells are wired (see Copper in renewable energy#Solar photovoltaic power generation) in series in the manufacture of a "laminate". The laminate is assembled into a protective weatherproof enclosure, thus making a photovoltaic module or solar panel. Modules may then be strung together into a photovoltaic array. In 2012, solar panels available for consumers had an efficiency of up to about 17%, while commercially available panels can go as far as 27%. By concentrating the sunlight it is possible to achieve higher efficiencies. A group from The Fraunhofer Institute for Solar Energy Systems has created a cell that can reach 44.7% efficiency using the equivalent of "297 suns".

==== Shading and dirt ====
Photovoltaic cell electrical output is extremely sensitive to shading (the so-called "Christmas light effect"). When even a small portion of a cell or of a module or array of cells in parallel is shaded, with the remainder in sunlight, the output falls dramatically due to internal 'short-circuiting' (the electrons reversing course through the shaded portion). When connected in series, the current drawn from a string of cells is no greater than the normally small current that can flow through the shaded cell, so the current (and therefore power) developed by the string is limited. If the external load is of low enough impedance, there may be enough voltage available from the other cells in a string to force more current through the shaded cell by breaking down the junction. This breakdown voltage in common cells is between 10 and 30 volts. Instead of adding to the power produced by the panel, the shaded cell absorbs power, turning it into heat. Since the reverse voltage of a shaded cell is much greater than the forward voltage of an illuminated cell, one shaded cell can absorb the power of many other cells in the string, disproportionately affecting panel output. For example, a shaded cell may drop 8 volts, instead of adding 0.5 volts, at a high current level, thereby absorbing the power produced by 16 other cells. It is thus important that a PV installation not be shaded by trees or other obstructions. There are techniques to mitigate the losses with diodes, but these techniques also entail losses.

Several methods have been developed to determine shading losses from trees to PV systems over both large regions using LiDAR, but also at an individual system level using 3D modeling software. Most modules have bypass diodes between each cell or string of cells that minimize the effects of shading and only lose the power that the shaded portion of the array would have supplied, as well as the power dissipated in the diodes. The main job of the bypass diode is to eliminate hot spots that form on cells that can cause further damage to the array, and cause fires.

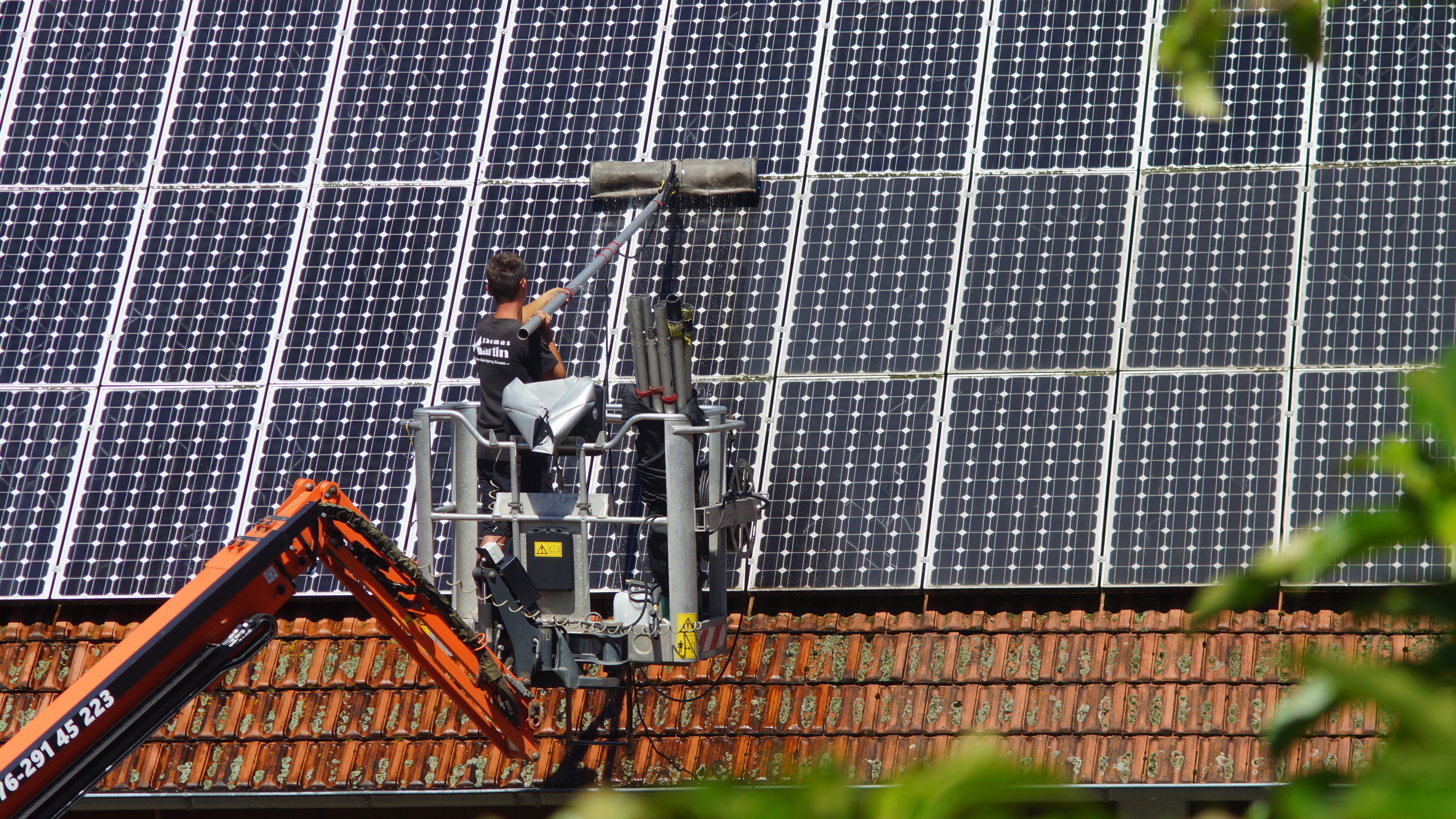
Cleaning a photovoltaic system

Sunlight can be absorbed by dust, snow, or other impurities at the surface of the module (collectively referred to as soiling). Soiling reduces the light that strikes the cells, which in turn reduces the power output of the PV system. Soiling losses aggregate over time, and can become large without adequate cleaning. In 2018, the global annual energy loss due to soiling was estimated to at least 3–4%. However, soiling losses vary significantly from region to region, and within regions. Maintaining a clean module surface will increase output performance over the life of the PV system. In one study performed in a snow-rich area (Ontario), cleaning flat mounted solar panels after 15 months increased their output by almost 100%. However, 5° tilted arrays were adequately cleaned by rainwater. In many cases, especially in arid regions, or in locations in close proximity to deserts, roads, industry, or agriculture, regular cleaning of the solar panels is cost-effective. In 2018, the estimated soiling-induced revenue loss was estimated to between 5 and 7 billion euros.

The long‐term reliability of photovoltaic modules is crucial to ensure the technical and economic viability of PV as a successful energy source. The analysis of degradation mechanisms of PV modules is key to ensure current lifetimes exceeding 25 years.

==== Insolation and energy ====
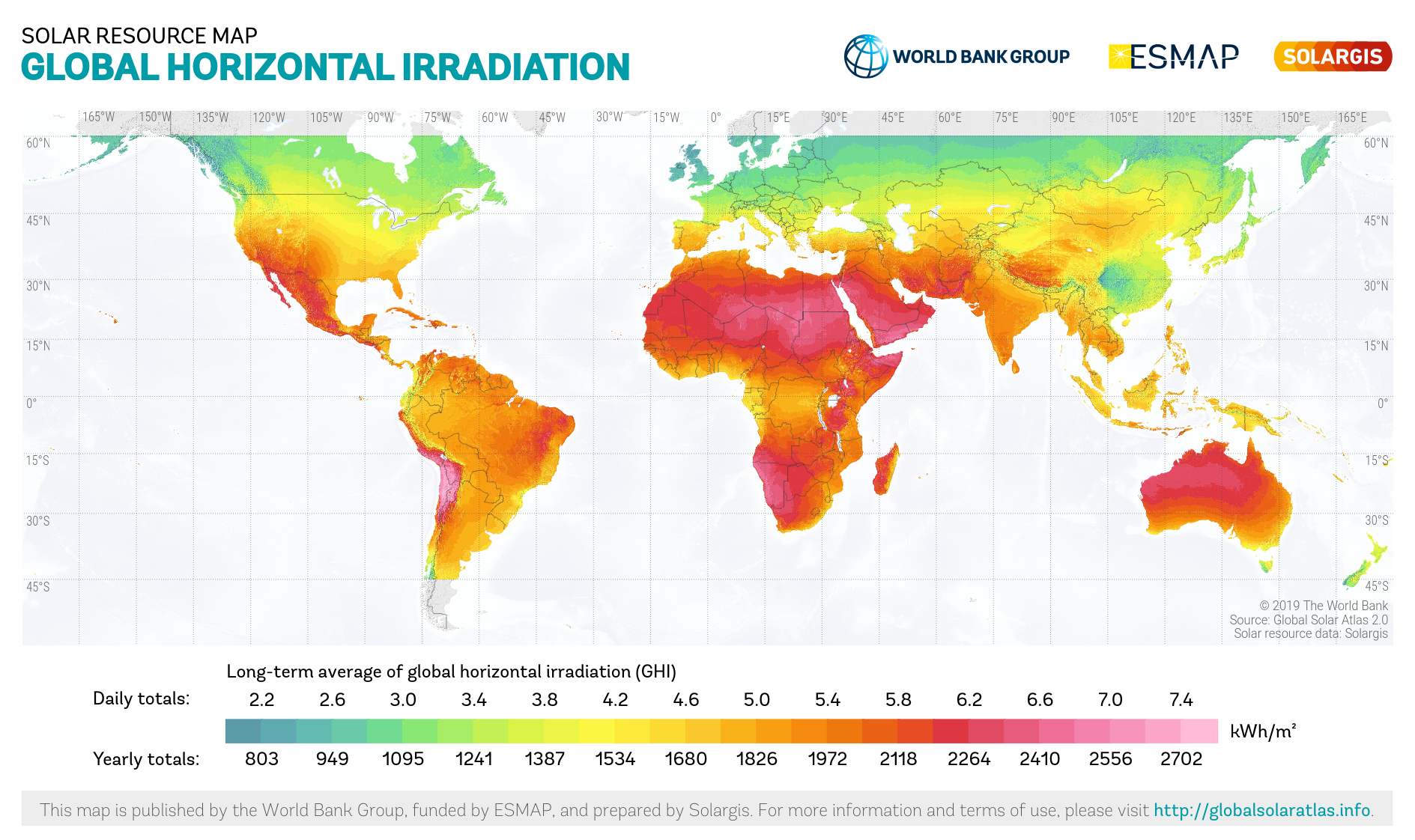
Global insolation on a horizontal surface

Solar insolation is made up of direct, diffuse, and reflected radiation. The absorption factor of a PV cell is defined as the fraction of incident solar irradiance that is absorbed by the cell. When the sun is at the zenith on a cloudless day, the power of the sun is about 1 kW/m^{2}, on the Earth's surface, to a plane that is perpendicular to the sun's rays. As such, PV arrays can track the sun through each day to greatly enhance energy collection. However, tracking devices add cost, and require maintenance, so it is more common for PV arrays to have fixed mounts that tilt the array and face due south in the northern hemisphere or due north in the southern hemisphere. The tilt angle from horizontal can be varied for season, but if fixed, should be set to give optimal array output during the peak electrical demand portion of a typical year for a stand-alone system. This optimal module tilt angle is not necessarily identical to the tilt angle for maximum annual array energy output. The optimization of the photovoltaic system for a specific environment can be complicated as issues of solar flux, soiling, and snow losses should be taken into effect. In addition, later work has shown that spectral effects can play a role in optimal photovoltaic material selection. For example, the spectrum of the albedo of the surroundings can play a significant role in output depending on the surface around the photovoltaic system and the type of solar cell material. A typical 1 kW photovoltaic installation in Australia or the southern latitudes of Europe or United States, may produce 3.5–5 kWh per day, dependent on location, orientation, tilt, insolation and other factors. In the Sahara desert, with less cloud cover and a better solar angle, one could ideally obtain closer to 8.3 kWh/m^{2}/day provided the nearly ever present wind would not blow sand onto the units. The area of the Sahara desert is over 9 million km^{2}. 90,600 km^{2}, or about 1%, could generate as much electricity as all of the world's power plants combined.

=== Mounting ===
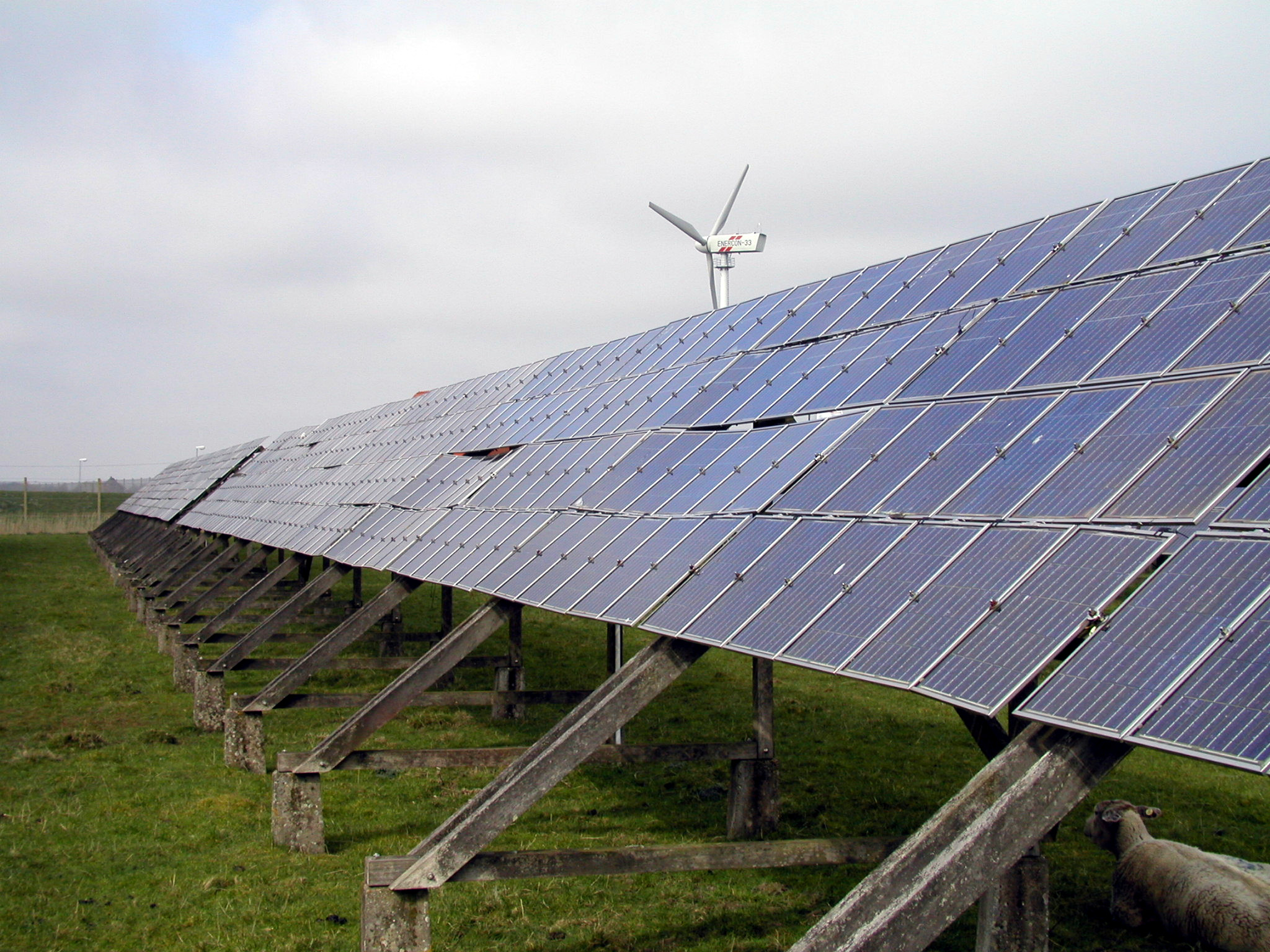
A 23-year-old ground mounted PV system from the 1980s on a North Frisian Island, Germany. The modules conversion efficiency was only 12%.

Modules are assembled into arrays on some kind of mounting system, which may be classified as ground mount, roof mount or pole mount. For solar parks a large rack is mounted on the ground, and the modules mounted on the rack. For buildings, many different racks have been devised for pitched roofs. For flat roofs, racks, bins and building integrated solutions are used. Solar panel racks mounted on top of poles can be stationary or moving, see Trackers below. Side-of-pole mounts are suitable for situations where a pole has something else mounted at its top, such as a light fixture or an antenna. Pole mounting raises what would otherwise be a ground mounted array above weed shadows and livestock, and may satisfy electrical code requirements regarding inaccessibility of exposed wiring. Pole mounted panels are open to more cooling air on their underside, which increases performance. A multiplicity of pole top racks can be formed into a parking carport or other shade structure. A rack which does not follow the sun from left to right may allow seasonal adjustment up or down.

=== Cabling ===
Due to their outdoor usage, solar cables are designed to be resistant against UV radiation and extremely high temperature fluctuations and are generally unaffected by the weather. Standards specifying the usage of electrical wiring in PV systems include the IEC 60364 by the International Electrotechnical Commission, in section 712 "Solar photovoltaic (PV) power supply systems", the British Standard BS 7671, incorporating regulations relating to microgeneration and photovoltaic systems, and the US UL4703 standard, in subject 4703 "Photovoltaic Wire".

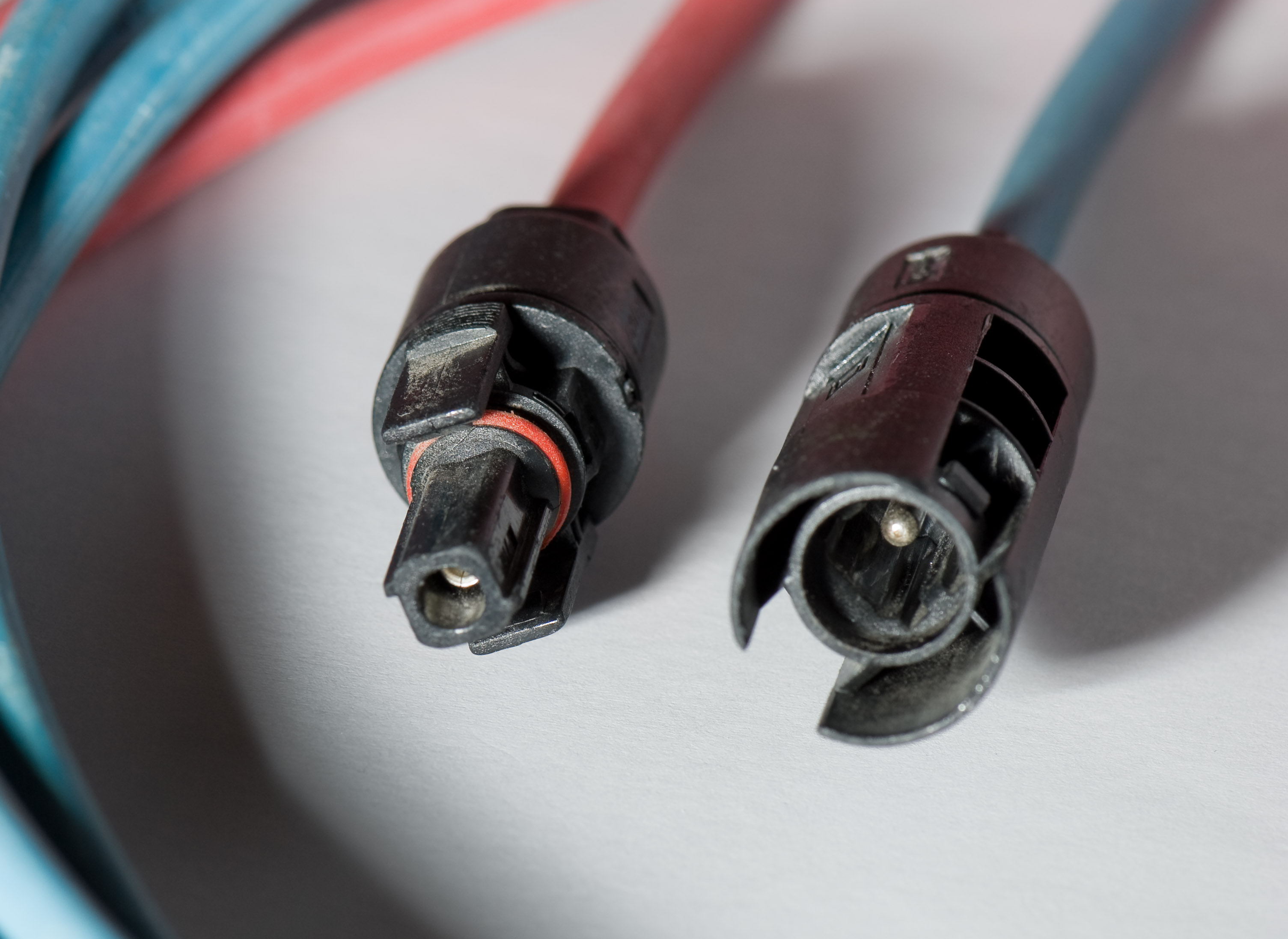
Weatherproof connectors on a solar panel cable

A solar cable is the interconnection cable used in photovoltaic power generation. Solar cables interconnect solar panels and other electrical components of a photovoltaic system. Solar cables are designed to be UV resistant and weather resistant. They can be used within a large temperature range.

Specific performance requirements for material used for wiring a solar panel installation are given in national and local electrical codes which regulate electrical installations in an area. General features required for solar cables are resistance to ultraviolet light, weather, temperature extremes of the area and insulation suitable for the voltage class of the equipment. Different jurisdictions will have specific rules regarding grounding (earthing) of solar power installations for electric shock protection and lightning protection.

=== Tracker ===
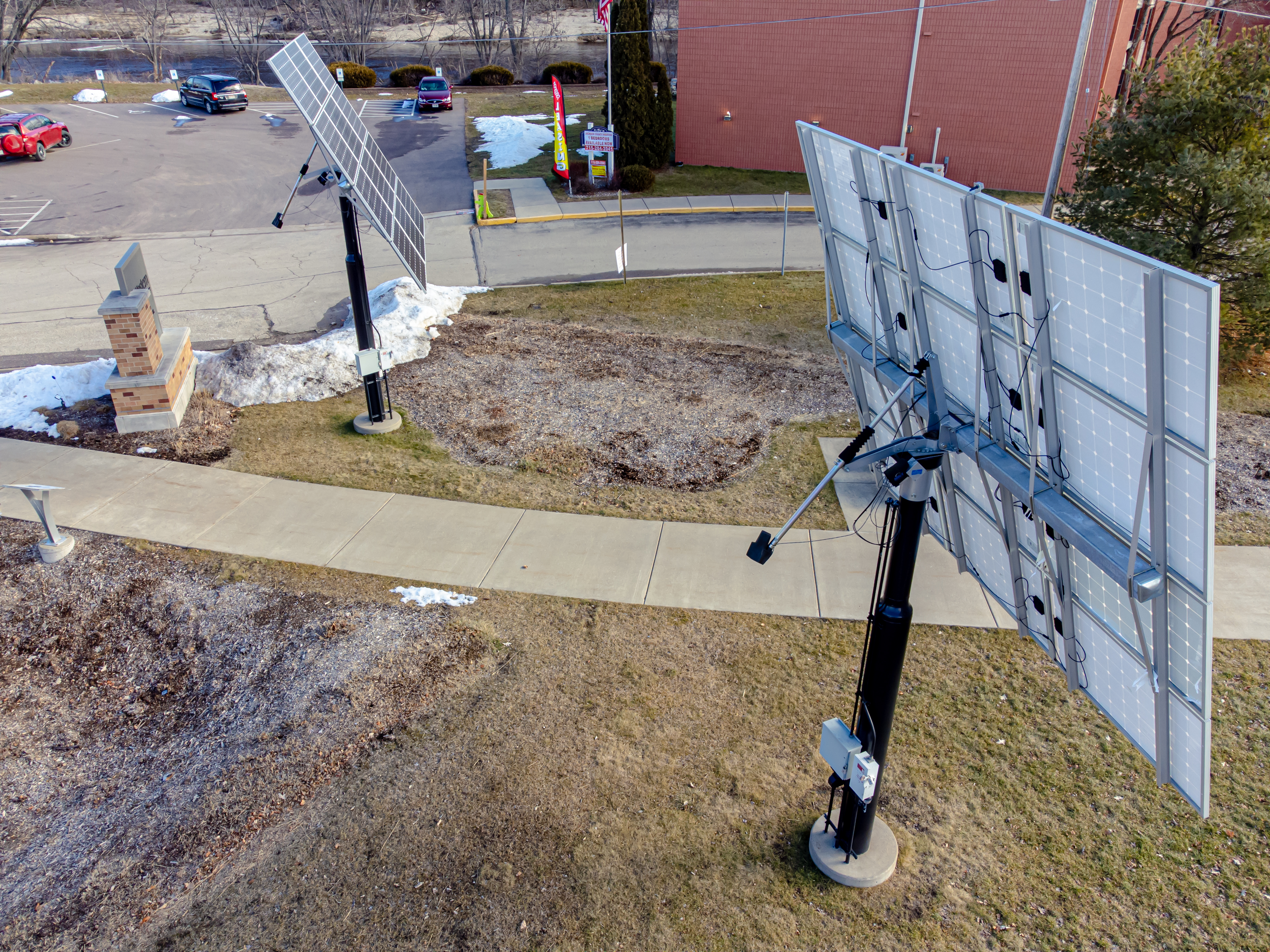
Dual axis solar trackers

A solar tracking system tilts a solar panel throughout the day. Depending on the type of tracking system, the panel is either aimed directly at the Sun or the brightest area of a partly clouded sky. Trackers greatly enhance early morning and late afternoon performance, increasing the total amount of power produced by a system by about 20–25% for a single axis tracker and about 30% or more for a dual axis tracker, depending on latitude. Trackers are effective in regions that receive a large portion of sunlight directly. In diffuse light (i.e. under cloud or fog), tracking has little or no value. Because most concentrated photovoltaics systems are very sensitive to the sunlight's angle, tracking systems allow them to produce useful power for more than a brief period each day. Tracking systems improve performance for two main reasons. First, when a solar panel is perpendicular to the sunlight, it receives more light on its surface than if it were angled. Second, direct light is used more efficiently than angled light. Special anti-reflective coatings can improve solar panel efficiency for direct and angled light, somewhat reducing the benefit of tracking.

Trackers and sensors to optimise the performance are often seen as optional, but they can increase viable output by up to 45%. Arrays that approach or exceed one megawatt often use solar trackers. Considering clouds, and the fact that most of the world is not on the equator, and that the sun sets in the evening, the correct measure of solar power is insolation – the average number of kilowatt-hours per square meter per day. For the weather and latitudes of the United States and Europe, typical insolation ranges from 2.26 kWh/m^{2}/day in northern climes to 5.61 kWh/m^{2}/day in the sunniest regions.

For large systems, the energy gained by using tracking systems can outweigh the added complexity. For very large systems, the added maintenance of tracking is a substantial detriment. Tracking is not required for flat panel and low-concentration photovoltaic systems. For high-concentration photovoltaic systems, dual axis tracking is a necessity. Pricing trends affect the balance between adding more stationary solar panels versus having fewer panels that track.

As pricing, reliability and performance of single-axis trackers have improved, the systems have been installed in an increasing percentage of utility-scale projects. According to data from WoodMackenzie/GTM Research, global solar tracker shipments hit a record 14.5 gigawatts in 2017. This represents growth of 32 percent year-over-year, with similar or greater growth projected as large-scale solar deployment accelerates.

=== Inverter ===
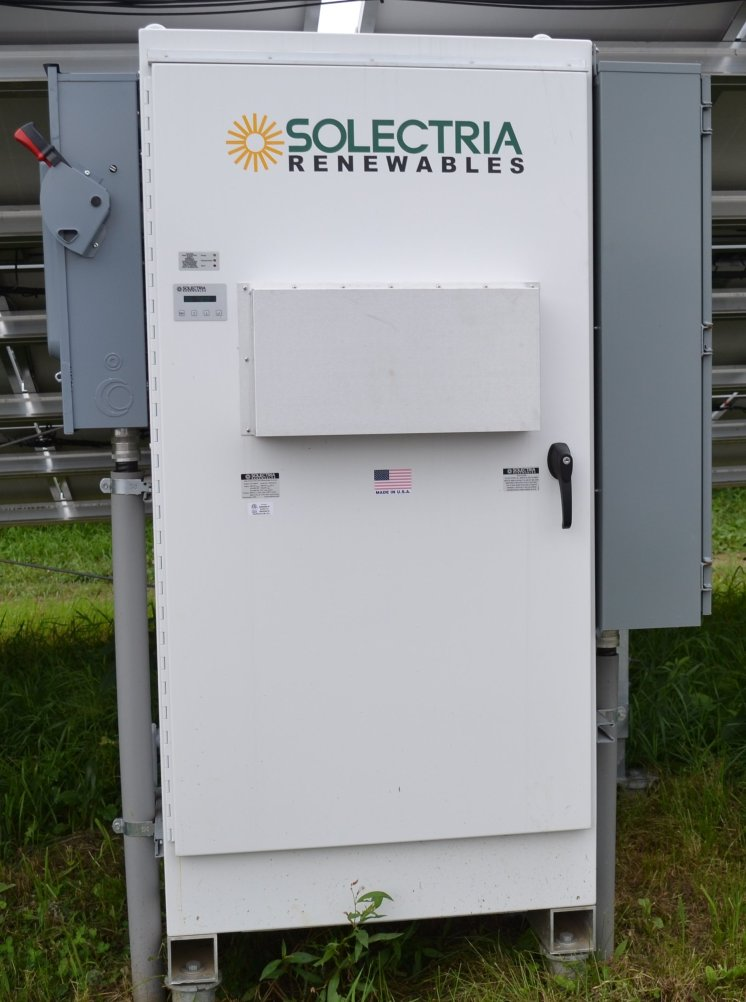
Central inverter with AC and DC disconnects (on the side), monitoring gateway, transformer isolation and interactive LCD

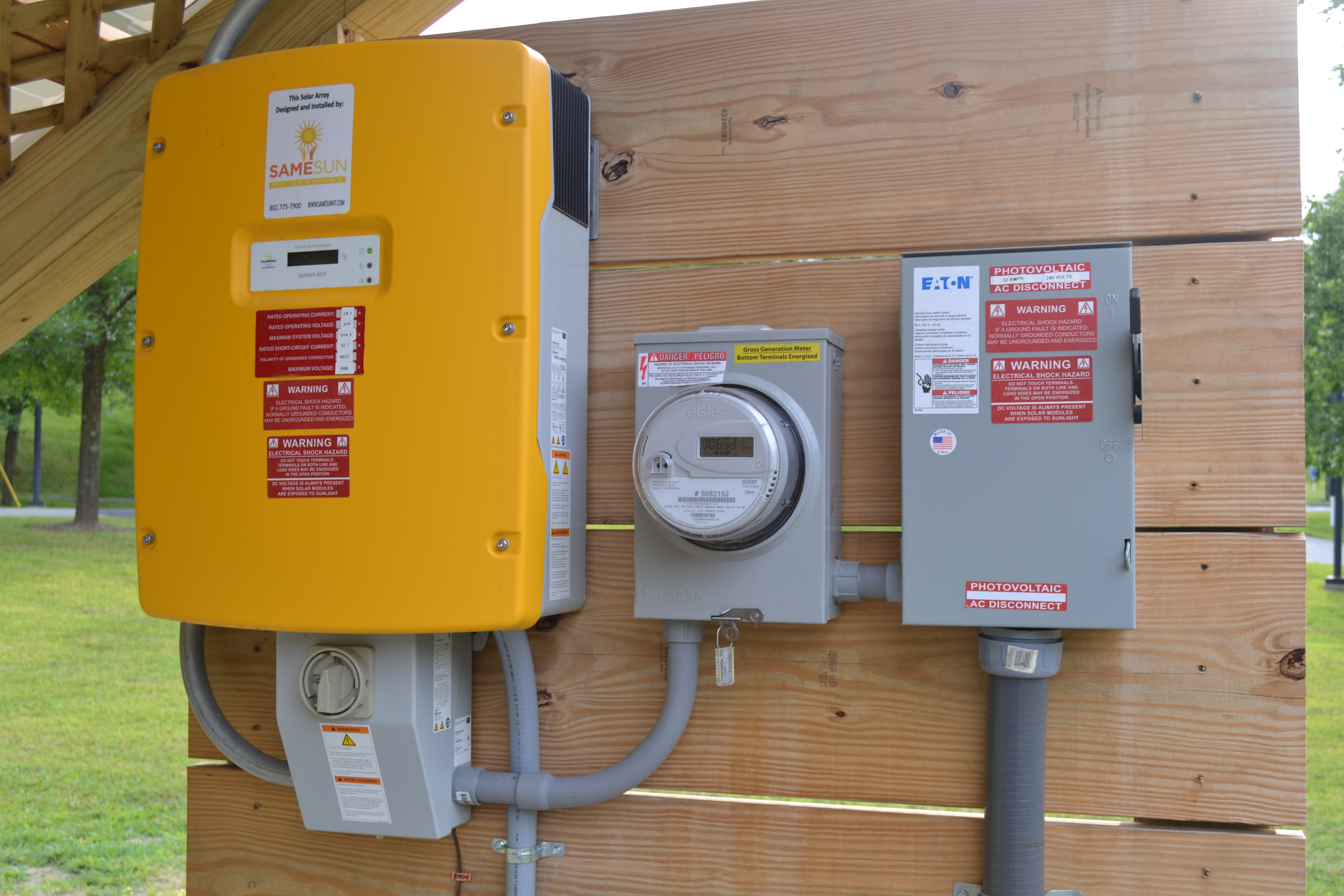
String inverter (left), generation meter, and AC disconnect (right). A modern 2013 installation in Vermont, United States.

Systems designed to deliver alternating current (AC), such as grid-connected applications need an inverter to convert the direct current (DC) from the solar modules to AC. Grid connected inverters must supply AC electricity in sinusoidal form, synchronized to the grid frequency, limit feed in voltage to no higher than the grid voltage and disconnect from the grid if the grid voltage is turned off. Islanding inverters need only produce regulated voltages and frequencies in a sinusoidal waveshape as no synchronisation or co-ordination with grid supplies is required.

A solar inverter may connect to a string of solar panels. In some installations a solar micro-inverter is connected at each solar panel. For safety reasons a circuit breaker is provided both on the AC and DC side to enable maintenance. AC output may be connected through an electricity meter into the public grid. The number of modules in the system determines the total DC watts capable of being generated by the solar array; however, the inverter ultimately governs the amount of AC watts that can be distributed for consumption. For example, a PV system comprising 11 kilowatts DC (kW_{DC}) worth of PV modules, paired with one 10-kilowatt AC (kW_{AC}) inverter, will be limited to the inverter's output of 10 kW. As of 2019, conversion efficiency for state-of-the-art converters reached more than 98 percent. While string inverters are used in residential to medium-sized commercial PV systems, central inverters cover the large commercial and utility-scale market. Market-share for central and string inverters are about 44 percent and 52 percent, respectively, with less than 1 percent for micro-inverters.

Maximum power point tracking (MPPT) is a technique that grid connected inverters use to get the maximum possible power from the photovoltaic array. In order to do so, the inverter's MPPT system digitally samples the solar array's ever changing power output and applies the proper impedance to find the optimal maximum power point.

Anti-islanding is a protection mechanism to immediately shut down the inverter, preventing it from generating AC power when the connection to the load no longer exists. This happens, for example, in the case of a blackout. Without this protection, the supply line would become an "island" with power surrounded by a "sea" of unpowered lines, as the solar array continues to deliver DC power during the power outage. Islanding is a hazard to utility workers, who may not realize that an AC circuit is still powered, and it may prevent automatic re-connection of devices. Anti-Islanding feature is not required for complete Off-Grid Systems.

Inverter/Converter market in 2019
Type	Power	Efficiency^{(a)}	Market Share^{(b)}	Remarks
String inverter	up to 150 kW_{p}^{(c)}	98%	61.6%	Cost^{(b)} €0.05-0.17 per watt-peak. Easy to replace.
Central inverter	above 80 kW_{p}	98.5%	36.7%	€0.04 per watt-peak. High reliability. Often sold along with a service contract.
Micro-inverter	module power range	90–97%	1.7%	€0.29 per watt-peak. Ease-of-replacement concerns.
DC/DC converter (Power optimizer)	module power range	99.5%	5.1%	€0.08 per watt-peak. Ease-of-replacement concerns. Inverter is still needed.
Source: data by IHS Markit 2020, remarks by Fraunhofer ISE 2020, from: Photovoltaics Report 2020, p. 39, PDF; Notes: ^{(a)}best efficiencies displayed, ^{(b)}market-share and cost per watt are estimated, ^{(c)}kW_{p} = kilowatt-peak, ^{(d)} Total Market Share is greater than 100% because DC/DC converters are required to be paired with string inverters

=== Battery ===
Although still expensive, PV systems increasingly use rechargeable batteries to store a surplus to be later used at night. Batteries used for grid-storage also stabilize the electrical grid by leveling out peak loads, and play an important role in a smart grid, as they can charge during periods of low demand and feed their stored energy into the grid when demand is high.

Common battery technologies used in today's PV systems include the valve regulated lead-acid battery – a modified version of the conventional lead–acid battery – nickel–cadmium and lithium-ion batteries. Compared to the other types, lead-acid batteries have a shorter lifetime and lower energy density. However, due to their high reliability, low self discharge as well as low investment and maintenance costs, they are currently (as of 2014) the predominant technology used in small-scale, residential PV systems, as lithium-ion batteries are still being developed and about 3.5 times as expensive as lead-acid batteries. Furthermore, as storage devices for PV systems are stationary, the lower energy and power density and therefore higher weight of lead-acid batteries are not as critical as, for example, in electric transportation Other rechargeable batteries considered for distributed PV systems include sodium–sulfur and vanadium redox batteries, two prominent types of a molten salt and a flow battery, respectively. In 2015, Tesla Motors launched the Powerwall, a rechargeable lithium-ion battery with the aim to revolutionize energy consumption.

PV systems with an integrated battery solution also need a charge controller, as the varying voltage and current from the solar array requires constant adjustment to prevent damage from overcharging. Basic charge controllers may simply turn the PV panels on and off, or may meter out pulses of energy as needed, a strategy called PWM or pulse-width modulation. More advanced charge controllers will incorporate MPPT logic into their battery charging algorithms. Charge controllers may also divert energy to some purpose other than battery charging. Rather than simply shut off the free PV energy when not needed, a user may choose to heat air or water once the battery is full.

=== Monitoring and metering ===
The metering must be able to accumulate energy units in both directions, or two meters must be used. Many meters accumulate bidirectionally, some systems use two meters, but a unidirectional meter (with detent) will not accumulate energy from any resultant feed into the grid. In some countries, for installations over 30 kW_{p} a frequency and a voltage monitor with disconnection of all phases is required. This is done where more solar power is being generated than can be accommodated by the utility, and the excess can not either be exported or stored. Grid operators historically have needed to provide transmission lines and generation capacity. Now they need to also provide storage. This is normally hydro-storage, but other means of storage are used. Initially storage was used so that baseload generators could operate at full output. With variable renewable energy, storage is needed to allow power generation whenever it is available, and consumption whenever needed.

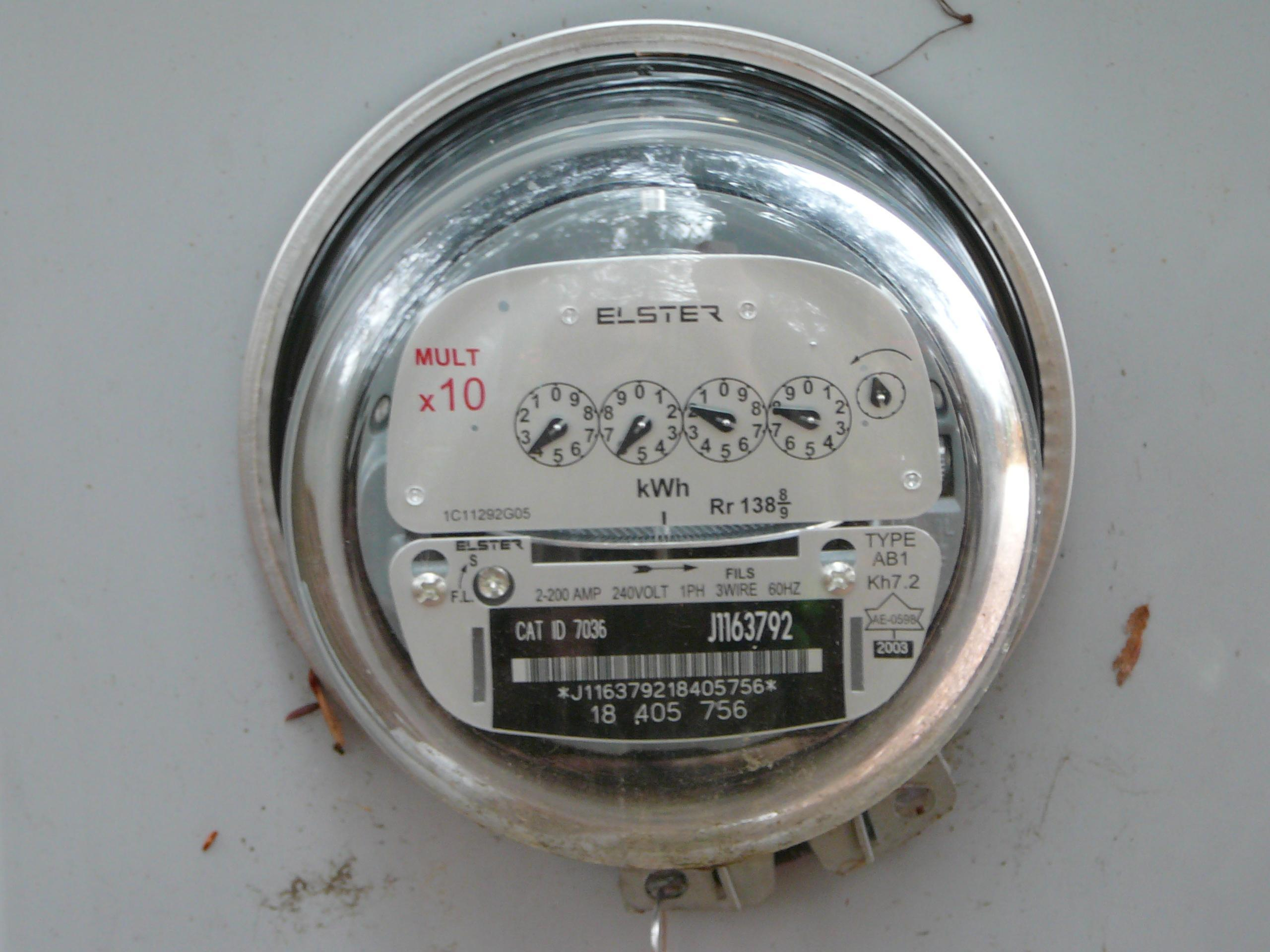
A Canadian electricity meter

The two variables a grid operator has are storing electricity for when it is needed, or transmitting it to where it is needed. If both of those fail, installations over 30kWp can automatically shut down, although in practice all inverters maintain voltage regulation and stop supplying power if the load is inadequate. Grid operators have the option of curtailing excess generation from large systems, although this is more commonly done with wind power than solar power, and results in a substantial loss of revenue. Three-phase inverters have the unique option of supplying reactive power which can be advantageous in matching load requirements.

Photovoltaic systems need to be monitored to detect breakdown and optimize operation. There are several photovoltaic monitoring strategies depending on the output of the installation and its nature. Monitoring can be performed on site or remotely. It can measure production only, retrieve all the data from the inverter or retrieve all of the data from the communicating equipment (probes, meters, etc.). Monitoring tools can be dedicated to supervision only or offer additional functions. Individual inverters and battery charge controllers may include monitoring using manufacturer specific protocols and software. Energy metering of an inverter may be of limited accuracy and not suitable for revenue metering purposes. A third-party data acquisition system can monitor multiple inverters, using the inverter manufacturer's protocols, and also acquire weather-related information. Independent smart meters may measure the total energy production of a PV array system. Separate measures such as satellite image analysis or a solar radiation meter (a pyranometer) can be used to estimate total insolation for comparison. Data collected from a monitoring system can be displayed remotely over the World Wide Web, such as OSOTF.

=== Sizing of the photovoltaic system ===
Knowing the annual energy consumption in Kwh $E_d$ of an institution or a family, for example of 2300Kwh, legible in its electricity bill, it is possible to calculate the number of photovoltaic panels necessary to satisfy its energy needs. By connecting to the site https://re.jrc.ec.europa.eu/pvg_tools/en/ , after selecting the location in which to install the panels or clicking on the map or typing the name of the location, you must select "Grid connected" and "Visualize results" obtaining the following table for example relating to the city of Palermo:

Provided inputs:;
Location [Lat/Lon]:;38.111,13.352
Horizon:;Calculated
Database used:;PVGIS-SARAH2
PV technology:;Crystalline silicon
PV installed [kWp]:;1
System loss [%]:;14
Simulation outputs:;
Slope angle [°]:;35
Azimuth angle [°]:;0
Yearly PV energy production [kWh]:;1519.1
Yearly in-plane irradiation [kWh/m2]:;1944.62
Year-to-year variability [kWh]:;47.61
Changes in output due to:;
Angle of incidence [%]:;-2.68
Spectral effects [%]:;0.88
Temperature and low irradiance [%]:;-7.48
Total loss [%]:;-21.88
PV electricity cost [per kWh]:;

Using the wxMaxima program, the number of panels required for an annual consumption of 2300 kWh and for a crystalline silicon technology with a slope angle of 35°, an azimuth angle of 0° and total losses equal to 21.88% is 6 rounded up:

E_d : 2300 ;
E_s : 1519.1 ;
P : 300 ;
Number_panels : 1000 * E_d / ( P * E_s ) ;

5.046847914335243

On average, each family manages to consume 30% of energy directly from the photovoltaic. The storage system can bring its self-consumption to a maximum of 70%, therefore the battery storage capacity that should be in the specific case is: 4.41 Kwh which rounded up is 4.8 Kwh

Battery_capacity : 0.70 * E_d/365 ;

4.410958904109589

If the price of energy is 0.5 €/Kwh then the cost of energy excluding taxes will be 1150€ per year:

Energy_cost : E_d * 0.5;

1150.0

So if a 300W panel costs €200, the 4.8Kwh battery costs €3000, the inverter to convert the direct current into alternating current €1000, the charge regulator €100, the installation costs €1000 the total cost will be €6,300 :

Total_cost :  200*6 + 3000 + 1000 + 100 + 1000  ;

3150

which are amortized over 5.46 years:

Years : Total_cost / Energy_cost ;

5.46...

having the battery a life of 10 years and the panels 25–30 years

== Other systems ==
This section includes systems that are either highly specialized and uncommon or still an emerging new technology with limited significance. However, standalone or off-grid systems take a special place. They were the most common type of systems during the 1980s and 1990s, when PV technology was still very expensive and a pure niche market of small scale applications. Only in places where no electrical grid was available, they were economically viable. Although new stand-alone systems are still being deployed all around the world, their contribution to the overall installed photovoltaic capacity is decreasing. In Europe, off-grid systems account for 1 percent of installed capacity. In the United States, they account for about 10 percent. Off-grid systems are still common in Australia and South Korea, and in many developing countries.

=== CPV ===
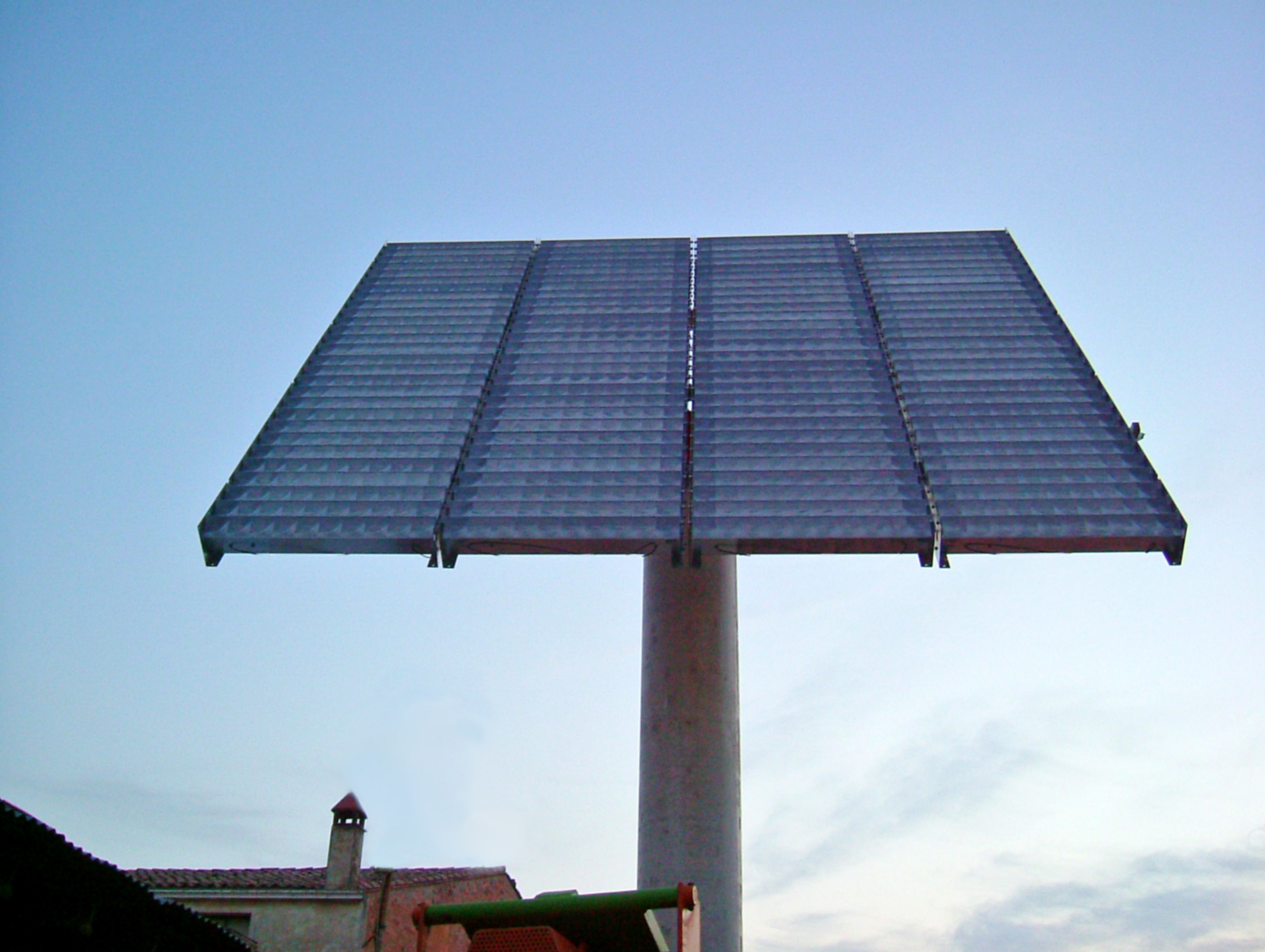
Concentrator photovoltaic (CPV) in Catalonia, Spain

Concentrator photovoltaics (CPV) and high concentrator photovoltaic (HCPV) systems use optical lenses or curved mirrors to concentrate sunlight onto small but highly efficient solar cells. Besides concentrating optics, CPV systems sometime use solar trackers and cooling systems and are more expensive.

Especially HCPV systems are best suited in location with high solar irradiance, concentrating sunlight up to 400 times or more, with efficiencies of 24–28 percent, exceeding those of regular systems. Various designs of systems are commercially available but not very common. However, ongoing research and development is taking place.

CPV is often confused with CSP (concentrated solar power) that does not use photovoltaics. Both technologies favor locations that receive much sunlight and directly compete with each other.

=== Hybrid ===
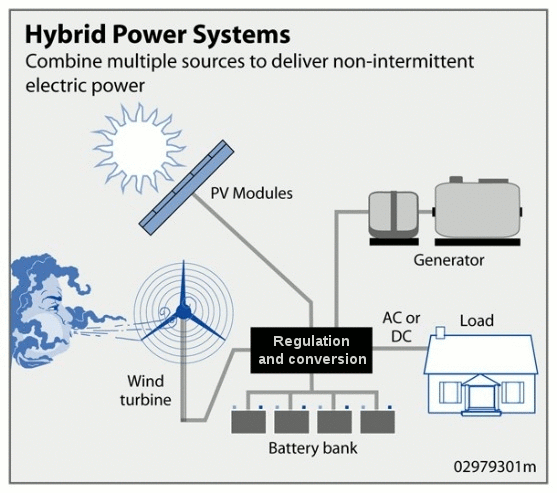
A wind-solar PV hybrid system

A hybrid system combines PV with other forms of generation, usually a diesel generator. Biogas is also used. The other form of generation may be a type able to modulate power output as a function of demand. However more than one renewable form of energy may be used e.g. wind. The photovoltaic power generation serves to reduce the consumption of non renewable fuel. Hybrid systems are most often found on islands. Pellworm island in Germany and Kythnos island in Greece are notable examples (both are combined with wind). The Kythnos plant has reduced diesel consumption by 11.2%.

In 2015, a case-study conducted in seven countries concluded that in all cases generating costs can be reduced by hybridising mini-grids and isolated grids. However, financing costs for such hybrids are crucial and largely depend on the ownership structure of the power plant. While cost reductions for state-owned utilities can be significant, the study also identified economic benefits to be insignificant or even negative for non-public utilities, such as independent power producers.

There has also been work showing that the PV penetration limit can be increased by deploying a distributed network of PV+CHP hybrid systems in the US. The temporal distribution of solar flux, electrical and heating requirements for representative US single family residences were analyzed and the results clearly show that hybridizing CHP (Combined Heat and Power) with PV can enable additional PV deployment above what is possible with a conventional centralized electric generation system. This theory was reconfirmed with numerical simulations using per second solar flux data to determine that the necessary battery backup to provide for such a hybrid system is possible with relatively small and inexpensive battery systems. In addition, large PV+CHP systems are possible for institutional buildings, which again provide back up for intermittent PV and reduce CHP runtime.

- PVT system (hybrid PV/T), also known as photovoltaic thermal hybrid solar collectors, convert solar radiation into thermal and electrical energy. Such a system combines a solar (PV) module with a solar thermal collector in a complementary way.
- CPVT system. A concentrated photovoltaic thermal hybrid (CPVT) system is similar to a PVT system. It uses concentrated photovoltaics (CPV) instead of conventional PV technology, and combines it with a solar thermal collector.
- CPV/CSP system is a proposed novel solar hybrid system, combining concentrator photovoltaics with the non-PV technology of concentrated solar power (CSP), or also known as concentrated solar thermal.
- PV diesel system combines a photovoltaic system with a diesel generator. Combinations with other renewables are possible and include wind turbines.

=== Floating solar arrays ===
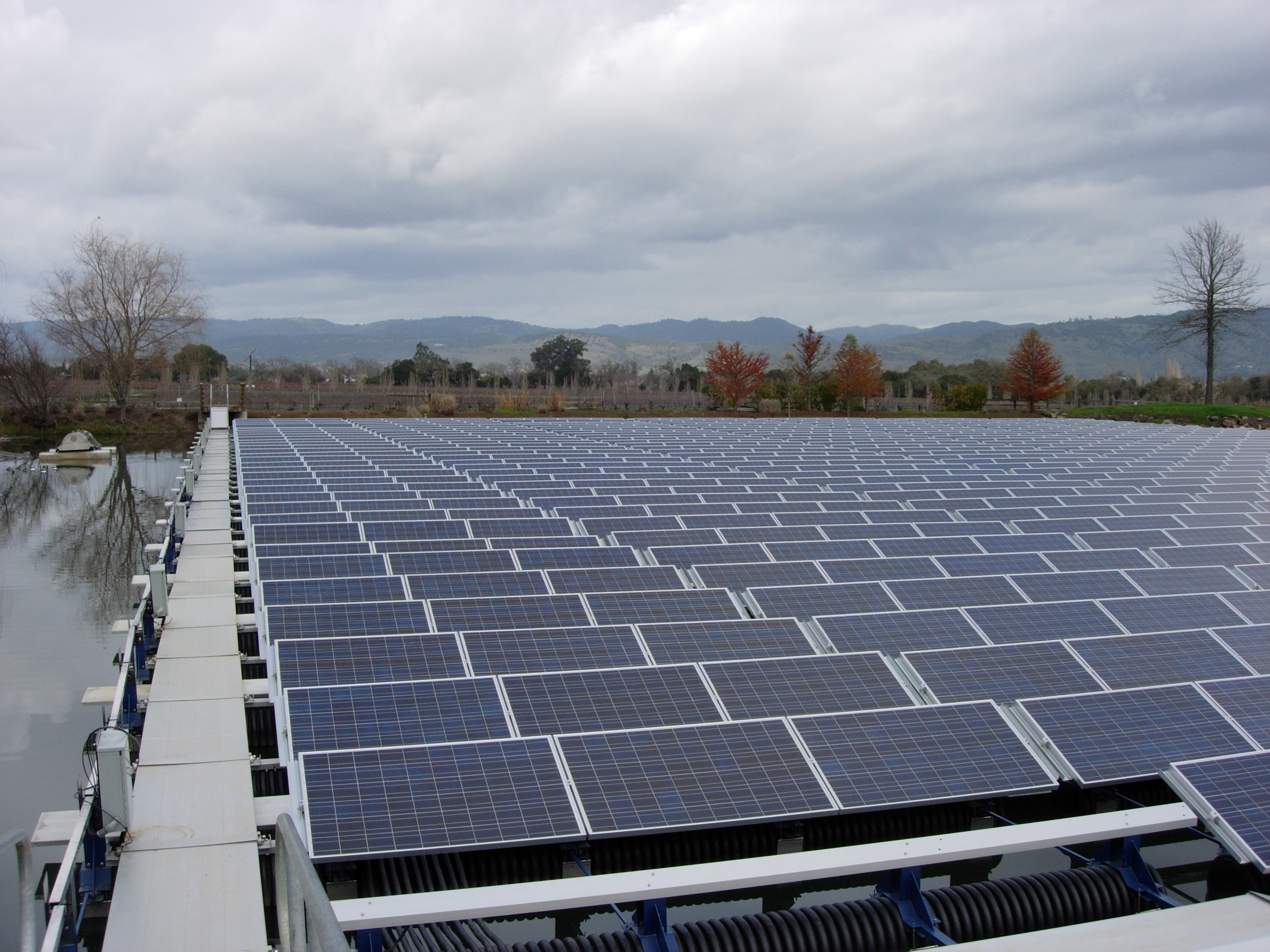
Floating photovoltaic on an irrigation pond

Floating solar or floating photovoltaics (FPV), sometimes called floatovoltaics, are solar panels mounted on a structure that floats. The structures that hold the panels usually consist of plastic buoys and cables. They are then placed on a body of water (e.g., Reservoirs, quarry lakes, irrigation canals or remediation and tailing ponds).

The systems can have advantages over photovoltaics (PV) on land. Water surfaces may be less expensive than the cost of land, and there are fewer rules and regulations for structures built on bodies of water not used for recreation. Life cycle analysis indicates that foam-based FPV have some of the shortest energy payback times (1.3 years) and the lowest greenhouse gas emissions to energy ratio (11 kg CO_{2} eq/MWh) in crystalline silicon solar photovoltaic technologies reported. FPV can be used to generate electricity for any application as well as to make green hydrogen via electrolysis on the same water they are floating on.

Floating arrays can achieve higher efficiencies than PV panels on land because water cools the panels. The panels can have a special coating to prevent rust or corrosion. Floating SPV also provide shade, slow evaporation and inhibit the growth of algae.

The market for this renewable energy technology has grown rapidly since 2016. The first 20 plants with capacities of a few dozen kWp were built between 2007 and 2013. Installed power grew from 3 GW in 2020, to 13 GW in 2022, surpassing a prediction of 10 GW by 2025. The World Bank estimated there are 6,600 large bodies of water suitable for floating solar, with a technical capacity of over 4,000 GW if 10% of their surfaces were covered with panels.

The US has more floating solar potential than any other country in the world. Bodies of water suitable for floating solar are well-distributed throughout the US The southeast and southern US plains states generally have reservoirs with the largest capacities.

=== Direct current grid ===
DC grids are found in electric powered transport: railways trams and trolleybuses. A few pilot plants for such applications have been built, such as the tram depots in Hannover Leinhausen, using photovoltaic contributors and Geneva (Bachet de Pesay). The 150 kW_{p} Geneva site feeds 600 V DC directly into the tram/trolleybus electricity network whereas before it provided about 15% of the electricity at its opening in 1999.

=== Standalone ===
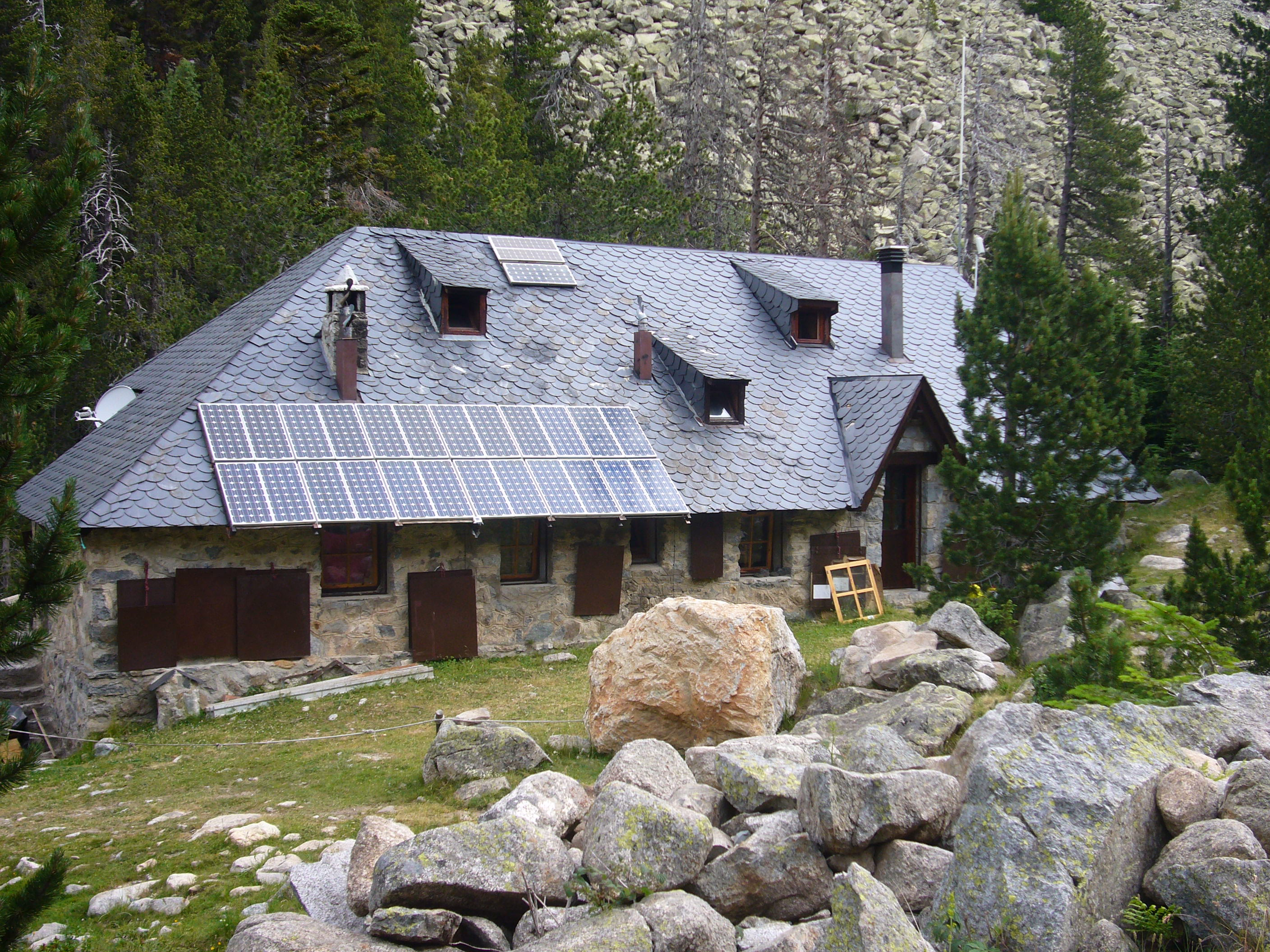
An isolated mountain hut in Catalonia, Spain

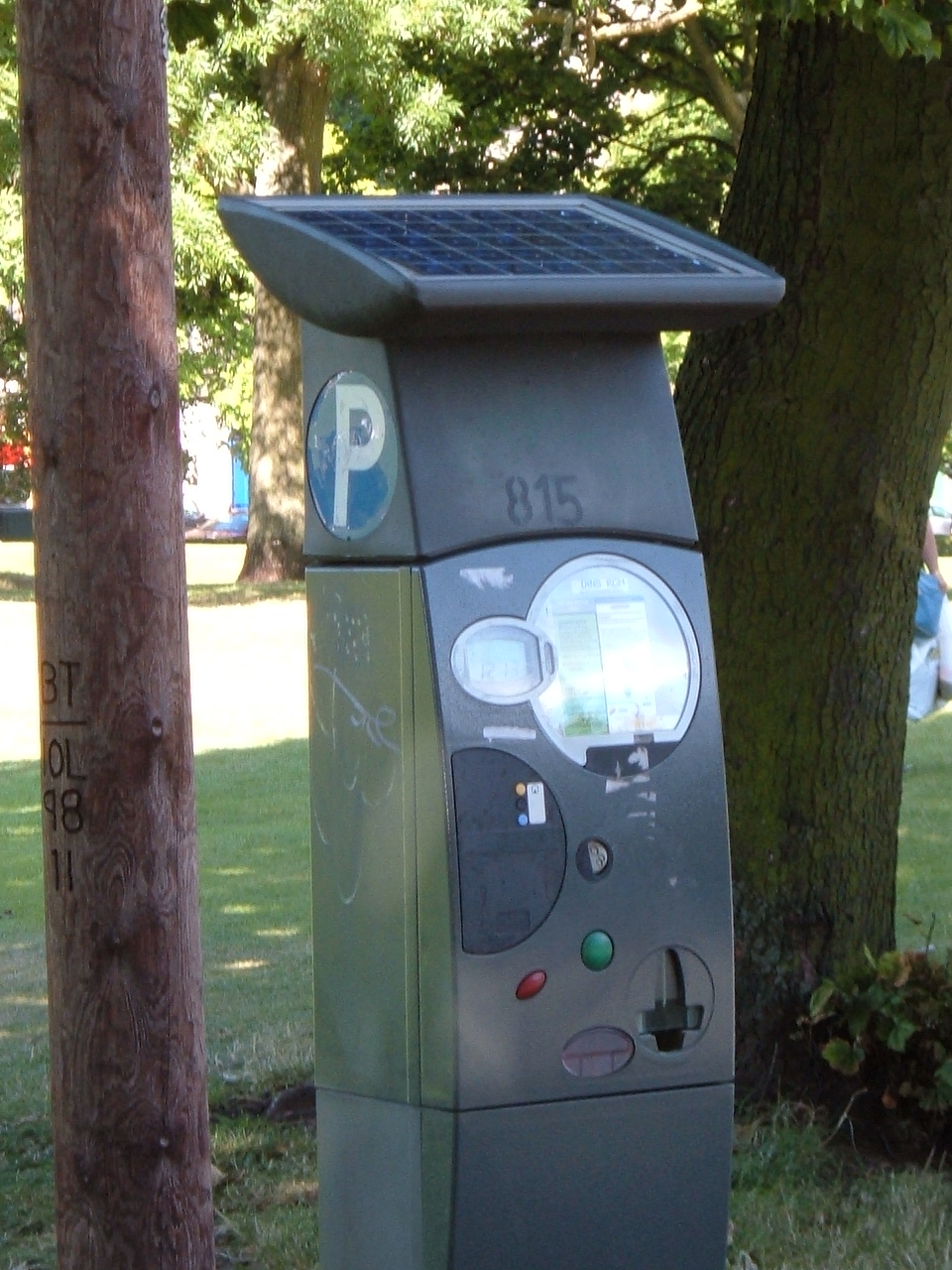
Solar parking meter in Edinburgh, Scotland

A stand-alone or off-grid system is not connected to the electrical grid. Standalone systems vary widely in size and application from wristwatches or calculators to remote buildings or spacecraft. If the load is to be supplied independently of solar insolation, the generated power is stored and buffered with a battery. In non-portable applications where weight is not an issue, such as in buildings, lead acid batteries are most commonly used for their low cost and tolerance for abuse.

A charge controller may be incorporated in the system to avoid battery damage by excessive charging or discharging. It may also help to optimize production from the solar array using a maximum power point tracking technique (MPPT). However, in simple PV systems where the PV module voltage is matched to the battery voltage, the use of MPPT electronics is generally considered unnecessary, since the battery voltage is stable enough to provide near-maximum power collection from the PV module. In small devices (e.g. calculators, parking meters) only direct current (DC) is consumed. In larger systems (e.g. buildings, remote water pumps) AC is usually required. To convert the DC from the modules or batteries into AC, an inverter is used.

In agricultural settings, the array may be used to directly power DC pumps, without the need for an inverter. In remote settings such as mountainous areas, islands, or other places where a power grid is unavailable, solar arrays can be used as the sole source of electricity, usually by charging a storage battery. Stand-alone systems closely relate to microgeneration and distributed generation.

== Costs and economy ==
Median installed system prices for residential PV Systems
in Japan, Germany and the United States ($/W)
View chart definition.
History of solar rooftop prices 2006–2013. Comparison in US$ per installed watt.

The cost of producing photovoltaic cells has dropped because of economies of scale in production and technological advances in manufacturing. For large-scale installations, prices below $1.00 per watt were common by 2012. A price decrease of 50% had been achieved in Europe from 2006 to 2011, and there was a potential to lower the generation cost by 50% by 2020. Crystal silicon solar cells have largely been replaced by less expensive multicrystalline silicon solar cells, and thin film silicon solar cells have also been developed at lower costs of production. Although they are reduced in energy conversion efficiency from single crystalline "siwafers", they are also much easier to produce at comparably lower costs.

The table below shows the total (average) cost in US cents per kWh of electricity generated by a photovoltaic system. The row headings on the left show the total cost, per peak kilowatt (kW_{p}), of a photovoltaic installation. Photovoltaic system costs have been declining and in Germany, for example, were reported to have fallen to USD 1389/kW_{p} by the end of 2014. The column headings across the top refer to the annual energy output in kWh expected from each installed kW_{p}. This varies by geographic region because the average insolation depends on the average cloudiness and the thickness of atmosphere traversed by the sunlight. It also depends on the path of the sun relative to the panel and the horizon. Panels are usually mounted at an angle based on latitude, and often they are adjusted seasonally to meet the changing solar declination. Solar tracking can also be utilized to access even more perpendicular sunlight, thereby raising the total energy output.

The calculated values in the table reflect the total (average) cost in cents per kWh produced. They assume a 10% total capital cost (for instance 4% interest rate, 1% operating and maintenance cost, and depreciation of the capital outlay over 20 years). Normally, photovoltaic modules have a 25-year warranty.

Cost of generated kilowatt-hour by a PV system (US¢/kWh) depending on solar radiation and installation cost during 20 years of operation
Installation cost in $ per watt	Insolation annually generated kilowatt-hours per installed kW-capacity (kWh/(kWp•y))								
Installation cost in $ per watt	2,400	2,200	2,000	1,800	1,600	1,400	1,200	1,000	800
$0.20	0.8	0.9	1.0	1.1	1.3	1.4	1.7	2.0	2.5
$0.60	2.5	2.7	3.0	3.3	3.8	4.3	5.0	6.0	7.5
$1.00	4.2	4.5	5.0	5.6	6.3	7.1	8.3	10.0	12.5
$1.40	5.8	6.4	7.0	7.8	8.8	10.0	11.7	14.0	17.5
$1.80	7.5	8.2	9.0	10.0	11.3	12.9	15.0	18.0	22.5
$2.20	9.2	10.0	11.0	12.2	13.8	15.7	18.3	22.0	27.5
$2.60	10.8	11.8	13.0	14.4	16.3	18.6	21.7	26.0	32.5
$3.00	12.5	13.6	15.0	16.7	18.8	21.4	25.0	30.0	37.5
$3.40	14.2	15.5	17.0	18.9	21.3	24.3	28.3	34.0	42.5
$3.80	15.8	17.3	19.0	21.1	23.8	27.1	31.7	38.0	47.5
$4.20	17.5	19.1	21.0	23.3	26.3	30.0	35.0	42.0	52.5
$4.60	19.2	20.9	23.0	25.6	28.8	32.9	38.3	46.0	57.5
$5.00	20.8	22.7	25.0	27.8	31.3	35.7	41.7	50.0	62.5
USA / Japan / Germany / Small rooftop system cost and average insolation applied to data table in 2013; Notes: 1. Cost per watt for rooftop system in 2013: Japan $4.64, United States $4.92, and Germany $2.05.; 2. Generated kilowatt-hour per installed watt-peak, based on average insolation for Japan (1500 kWh/m^{2}/year), United States (5.0 to 5.5 kWh/m^{2}/day), and Germany (1000 to 1200 kWh/m^{2}/year).; 3. A 2013 study by the Fraunhofer ISE concludes LCOE cost for a small PV system to be $0.16 (€0.12) rather than $0.22 per kilowatt-hour as shown in table (Germany).

=== Learning curve ===
Photovoltaic systems demonstrate a learning curve in terms of levelized cost of electricity (LCOE), reducing its cost per kWh by 32.6% for every doubling of capacity. From the data of LCOE and cumulative installed capacity from International Renewable Energy Agency (IRENA) from 2010 to 2017, the learning curve equation for photovoltaic systems is given as

$LCOE_{photovoltaic}=151.46 \, Capacity^{-0.57}$

- LCOE: levelized cost of electricity (in USD/kWh)
- Capacity: cumulative installed capacity of photovoltaic systems (in MW)

== Regulation ==
=== Standardization ===
Increasing use of photovoltaic systems and integration of photovoltaic power into existing structures and techniques of supply and distribution increases the need for general standards and definitions for photovoltaic components and systems. The standards are compiled at the International Electrotechnical Commission (IEC) and apply to efficiency, durability and safety of cells, modules, simulation programs, plug connectors and cables, mounting systems, overall efficiency of inverters etc.

=== National regulations ===
==== United Kingdom ====
In the UK, PV installations are generally considered permitted development and do not require planning permission. If the property is listed or in a designated area (National Park, Area of Outstanding Natural Beauty, Site of Special Scientific Interest or Norfolk Broads) then planning permission is required.

UK Solar PV installations are also subject to control under the Building Regulations 2010. Buildings regulation approval is therefore necessary for both domestic and commercial solar PV rootop installations to ensure that they meet the required safety standards. This includes ensuring that the roof can support the weight of the solar panels, that the electrical connections are safe, and that there are no fire risks.

==== United States ====
In the United States, article 690 of the National Electric Code provides general guidelines for the installation of photovoltaic systems; these may be superseded by local laws and regulations. Often a permit is required necessitating plan submissions and structural calculations before work may begin. Additionally, many locales require the work to be performed under the guidance of a licensed electrician.

The Authority Having Jurisdiction (AHJ) will review designs and issue permits, before construction can lawfully begin. Electrical installation practices must comply with standards set forth within the National Electrical Code (NEC) and be inspected by the AHJ to ensure compliance with building code, electrical code, and fire safety code. Jurisdictions may require that equipment has been tested, certified, listed, and labeled by at least one of the Nationally Recognized Testing Laboratories (NRTL). Many localities require a permit to install a photovoltaic system. A grid-tied system normally requires a licensed electrician to connect between the system and the grid-connected wiring of the building. Installers who meet these qualifications are located in almost every state. Several states prohibit homeowners' associations from restricting solar devices.

==== Spain ====
Although Spain generates around 40% of its electricity via photovoltaic and other renewable energy sources, and cities such as Huelva and Seville boast nearly 3,000 hours of sunshine per year, in 2013 Spain issued a solar tax to account for the debt created by the investment done by the Spanish government. Those who do not connect to the grid can face up to a fine of 30 million euros (US$40 million). Such measures were finally withdrawn by 2018, when new legislation was introduced banning any taxes on renewable energy self-consumption.

== Limitations ==
=== Impact on electricity network ===
With the increasing levels of rooftop photovoltaic systems, the energy flow becomes two-way. When there is more local generation than consumption, electricity is exported to the grid. However, electricity network traditionally is not designed to deal with the two-way energy transfer. Therefore, some technical issues may occur. For example, in Queensland, Australia, there have been more than 30% of households with rooftop PV by the end of 2017. The famous Californian 2020 duck curve appears very often for a lot of communities from 2015 onwards. An over-voltage issue may come out as the electricity flows back to the network. There are solutions to manage the over voltage issue, such as regulating PV inverter power factor, new voltage and energy control equipment at electricity distributor level, re-conductor the electricity wires, demand side management, etc. There are often limitations and costs related to these solutions. A way to calculate these costs and benefits is to use the concept of 'value of solar' (VOS), which includes the avoided costs/losses including: plant operations ans maintenance (fixed and variable); fuel; generation capacity, reserve capacity, transmission capacity, distribution capacity, and environmental and health liability. Popular Mechanics reports that VOS results show that grid-tied utility customers are being grossly under-compensated in most of the US as the value of solar eclipses the net metering rate as well as two-tiered rates, which means "your neighbor's solar panels are secretly saving you money".

=== Implications for electricity bill management and energy investment ===
Customers have different specific situations, e.g. different comfort/convenience needs, different electricity tariffs, or different usage patterns. An electricity tariff may have a few elements, such as daily access and metering charge, energy charge (based on kWh, MWh) or peak demand charge (e.g. a price for the highest 30min energy consumption in a month). PV is a promising option for reducing energy charge when electricity price is reasonably high and continuously increasing, such as in Australia and Germany. However, for sites with peak demand charge in place, PV may be less attractive if peak demands mostly occur in the late afternoon to early evening, for example residential communities. Overall, energy investment is largely an economic decision and investment decisions are based on systematical evaluation of options in operational improvement, energy efficiency, onsite generation and energy storage.

== Grid-connected photovoltaic system ==
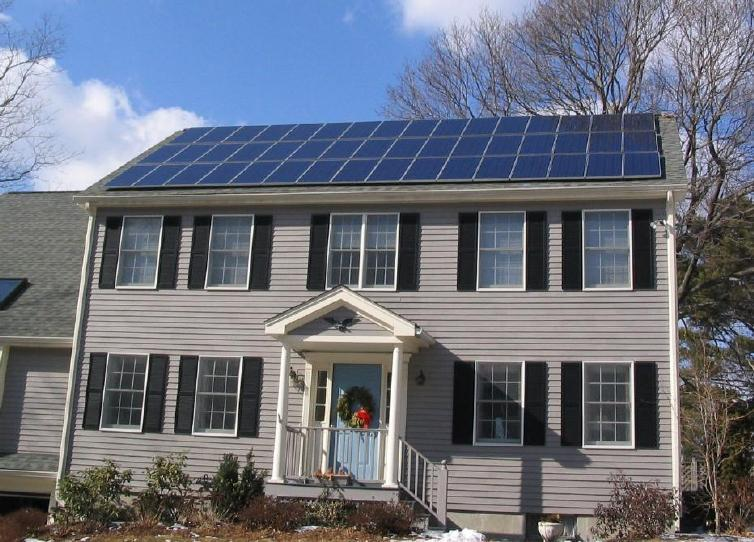
A grid-connected, residential solar rooftop system near Boston, US

A grid-connected photovoltaic system, or grid-connected PV system is an electricity generating solar PV power system that is connected to the utility grid. A grid-connected PV system consists of solar panels, one or several inverters, a power conditioning unit and grid connection equipment. They range from small residential and commercial rooftop systems to large utility-scale solar power stations. When conditions are right, the grid-connected PV system supplies the excess power, beyond consumption by the connected load, to the utility grid.

== Operation ==
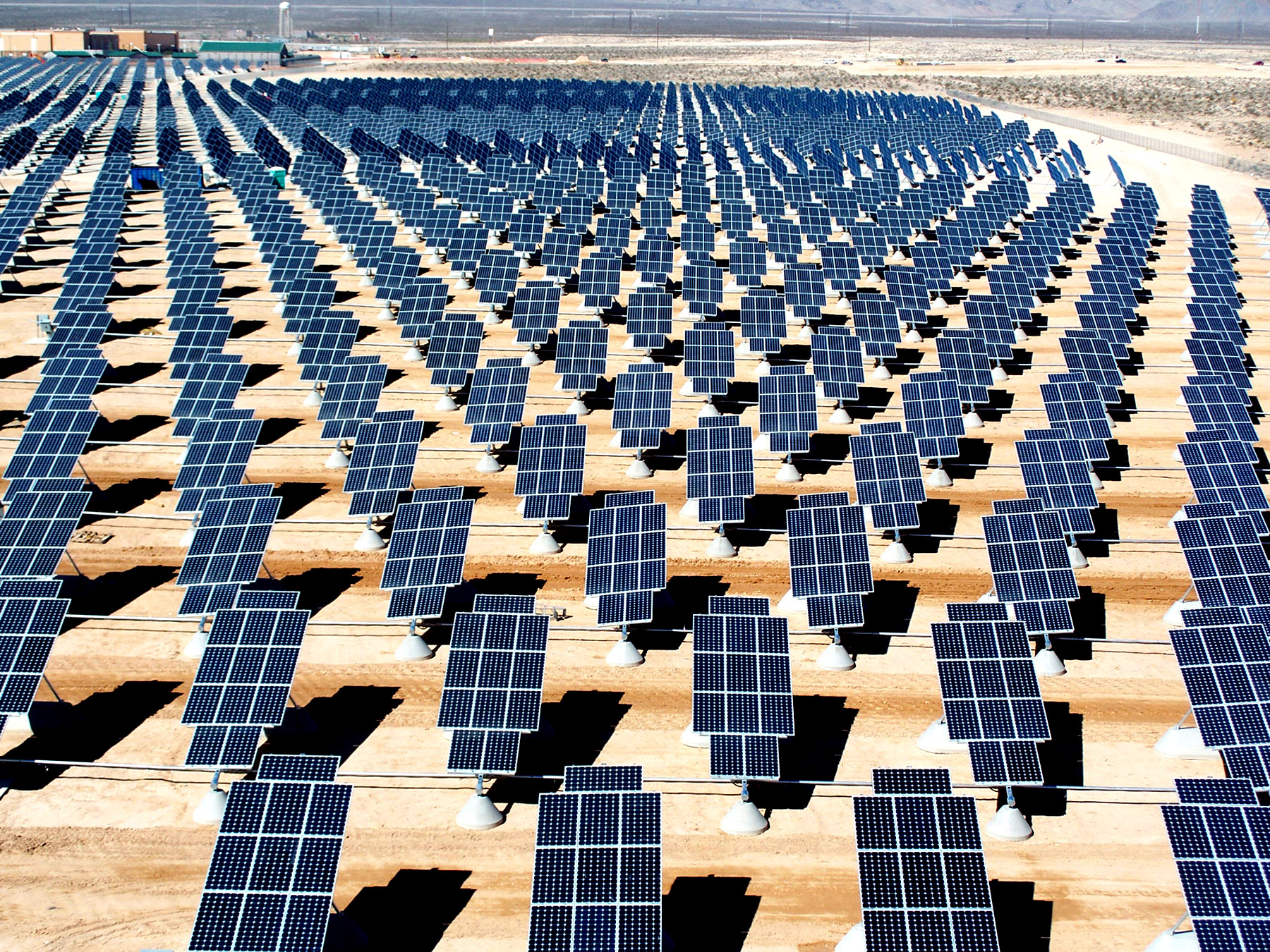
Photovoltaic power station at Nellis Air Force Base, United States

Residential, grid-connected rooftop systems which have a capacity more than 10 kilowatts can meet the load of most consumers. They can feed excess power to the grid where it is consumed by other users. The feedback is done through a meter to monitor power transferred. Photovoltaic wattage may be less than average consumption, in which case the consumer will continue to purchase grid energy, but a lesser amount than previously. If photovoltaic wattage substantially exceeds average consumption, the energy produced by the panels will be much in excess of the demand. In this case, the excess power can yield revenue by selling it to the grid. Depending on their agreement with their local grid energy company, the consumer only needs to pay the cost of electricity consumed less the value of electricity generated. This will be a negative number if more electricity is generated than consumed. Additionally, in some cases, cash incentives are paid from the grid operator to the consumer.

Connection of the photovoltaic power system can be done only through an interconnection agreement between the consumer and the utility company. The agreement details the various safety standards to be followed during the connection.

== Features ==
Electric power from photovoltaic panels must be converted to alternating current by a special power inverter if it is intended for delivery to a power grid. The inverter sits between the solar array and the grid, and may be a large stand-alone unit or may be a collection of small inverters attached to individual solar panels as an AC module. The inverter must monitor grid voltage, waveform, and frequency. The inverter must detect failure of the grid supply, and then, must not supply power to the grid. An inverter connected to a malfunctioning power line will automatically disconnect in accordance with safety rules, which vary by jurisdiction. The location of the fault current plays a crucial part in deciding whether the protection mechanism of the inverter will kick in, especially for low and medium electricity supply network. A protection system must ensure proper operation for faults external to the inverter on the supply network. The special inverter must also be designed to synchronize its AC frequency with the grid, to ensure the correct integration of the inverter power flow into the grid according to the waveform.

== Advantages ==
- Systems such as Net Metering and Feed-in Tariff which are offered by some system operators, can offset a customer's electricity usage costs. In some locations though, grid technologies cannot cope with distributed generation feeding into the grid, so the export of surplus electricity is not possible and that surplus is earthed.
- Grid-connected PV systems are comparatively easier to install as they do not require a battery system.
- Grid interconnection of photovoltaic (PV) power generation systems has the advantage of effective utilization of generated power because there are no storage losses involved.
- A photovoltaic power system is carbon negative over its lifespan, as any energy produced over and above that to build the panel initially offsets the need for burning fossil fuels. Even though the sun doesn't always shine, any installation gives a reasonably predictable average reduction in carbon consumption.

== Disadvantages ==
- Grid-connected PV can cause issues with voltage regulation. The traditional grid operates under the assumption of one-way, or radial, flow. But electricity injected into the grid increases voltage, and can drive levels outside the acceptable bandwidth of ±5%.
- Grid-connected PV can compromise power quality. PV's intermittent nature means rapid changes in voltage. This not only wears out voltage regulators due to frequent adjusting, but also can result in voltage flicker.
- Connecting to the grid poses many protection-related challenges. In addition to islanding, as mentioned above, too high levels of grid-connected PV result in problems like relay desensitization, nuisance tripping, interference with automatic reclosers, and ferroresonance.

== Islanding ==
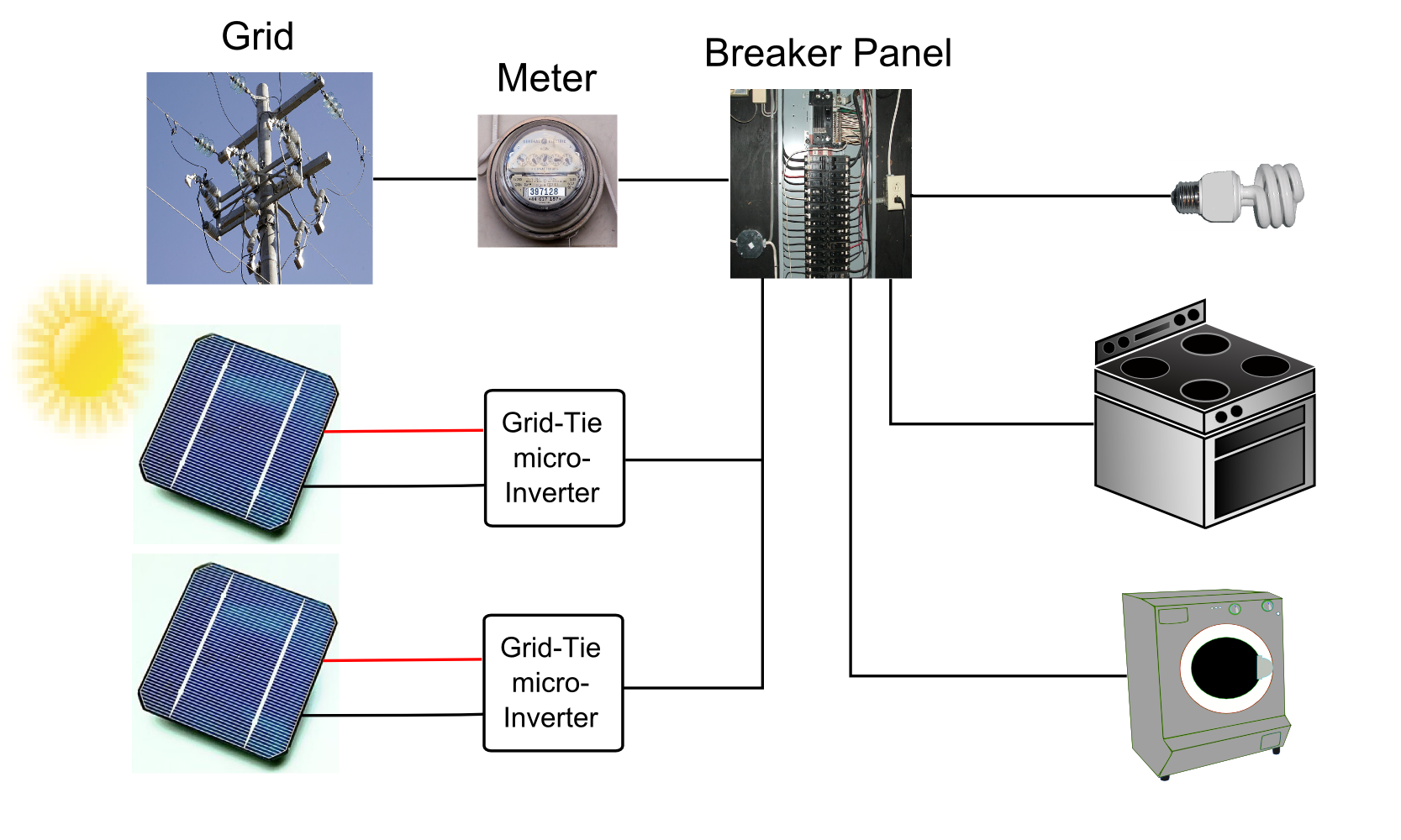
Diagram of a residential grid-connected PV system

Islanding is the condition in which a distributed generator continues to power a location even though power from the electric utility grid is no longer present. Islanding can be dangerous to utility workers, who may not realize that a circuit is still powered, even though there is no power from the electrical grid. For that reason, distributed generators must detect islanding and immediately stop producing power; this is referred to as anti-islanding.

=== Anti-islanding ===
In the case of a utility blackout in a grid-connected PV system, the solar panels will continue to deliver power as long as the sun is shining. In this case, the supply line becomes an "island" with power surrounded by a "sea" of unpowered lines. For this reason, solar inverters that are designed to supply power to the grid are generally required to have automatic anti-islanding circuitry in them. In intentional islanding, the generator disconnects from the grid, and forces the distributed generator to power the local circuit. This is often used as a power backup system for buildings that normally sell their power to the grid.

There are two types of anti-islanding control techniques:

- Passive: The voltage and/or the frequency change during the grid failure is measured and a positive feedback loop is employed to push the voltage and/or the frequency further away from its nominal value. Frequency or voltage may not change if the load matches very well with the inverter output or the load has a very high quality factor (reactive to real power ratio). So there exists some Non Detection Zone (NDZ).
- Active: This method employs injecting some error in frequency or voltage. When grid fails, the error accumulates and pushes the voltage and/or frequency beyond the acceptable range.

== See also ==
- Solar power
- Renewable energy
- Variable renewable energy
- Photovoltaics
- Building-integrated photovoltaics
- Distributed generation
- Grid energy storage
- List of countries by electricity production from renewable sources
