= Rooftop solar power =

Type of photovoltaic system

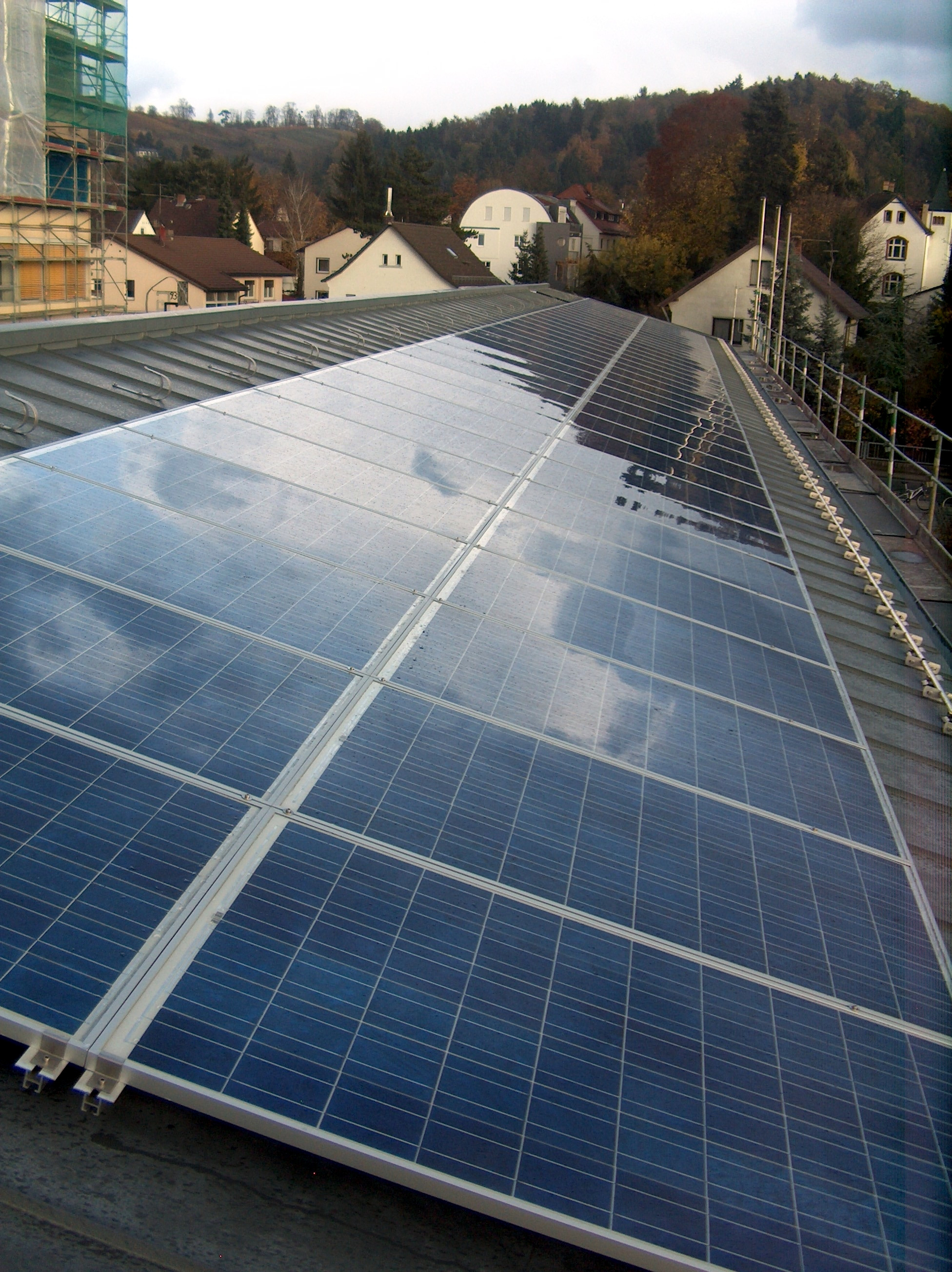
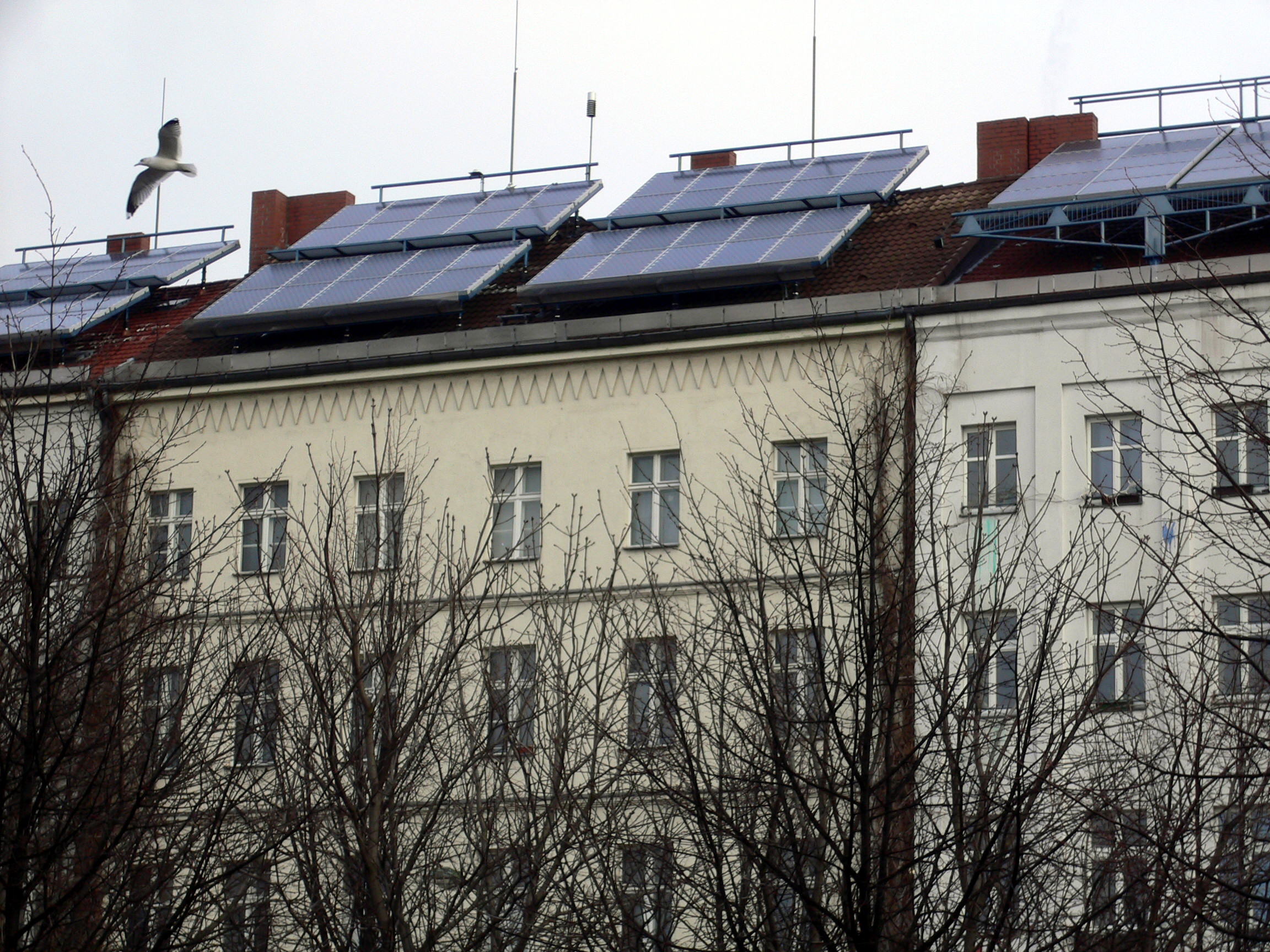
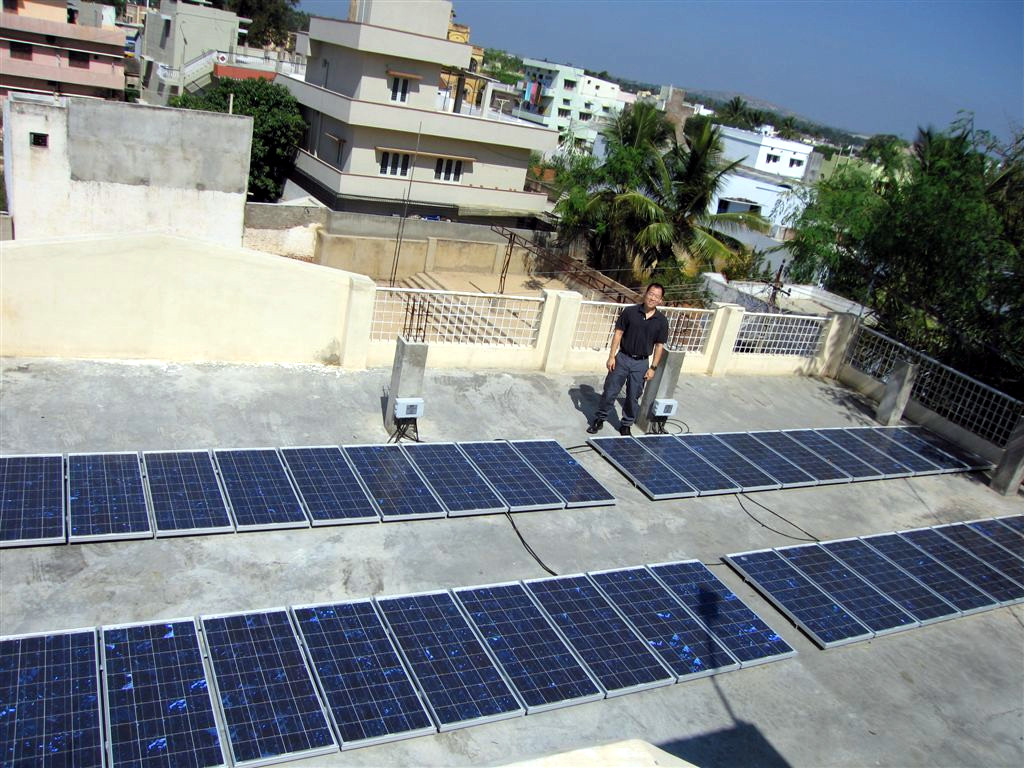
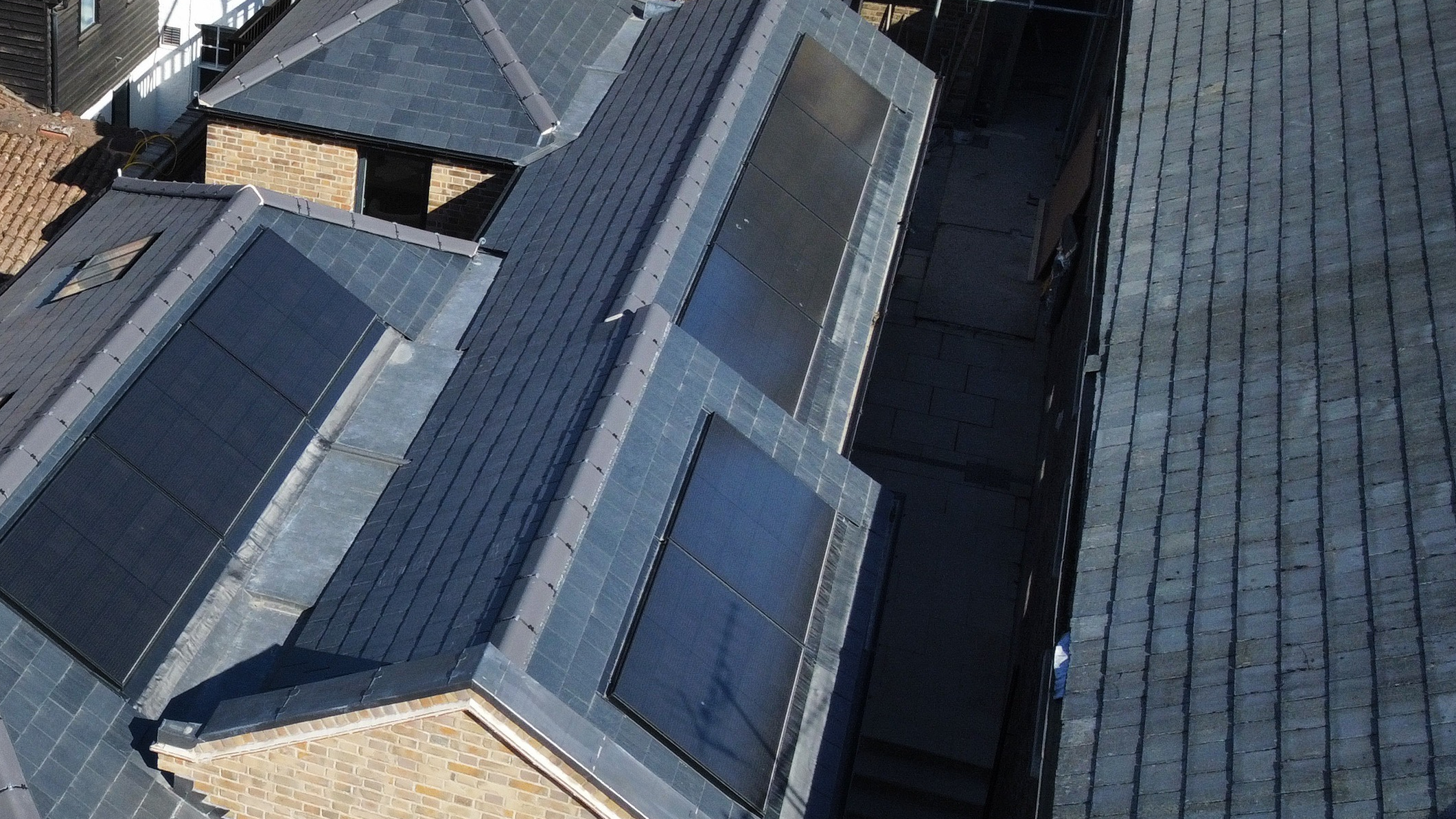
Rooftop PV systems around the world: Bensheim, Germany (top-left), Berlin, Germany (top-right), Kuppam, India (bottom-left), Greencap Energy solar array on Eton College, United Kingdom (bottom-right)

A rooftop solar power system, or rooftop PV system, is a photovoltaic (PV) system that has its electricity-generating solar panels mounted on the rooftop of a residential or commercial building or structure. The various components of such a system include photovoltaic modules, mounting systems, cables, solar inverters battery storage systems, charge controllers, monitoring systems, racking and mounting systems, energy management systems, net metering systems, disconnect switches, grounding equipment, protective devices, combiner boxes, weatherproof enclosures and other electrical accessories.

Rooftop mounted systems are small compared to utility-scale solar ground-mounted photovoltaic power stations with capacities in the megawatt range, hence being a form of distributed generation. A comprehensive life cycle analysis study showed that rooftop solar is better for the environment than utility-scale solar. Most rooftop PV stations are Grid-connected photovoltaic power systems. Rooftop PV systems on residential buildings typically feature a capacity of about 5–20 kilowatts (kW), while those mounted on commercial buildings often reach 100 kilowatts to 1 megawatt (MW). Very large roofs can house industrial scale PV systems in the range of 1–10 MW.

As of 2022, around 25 million households rely on rooftop solar power worldwide. Australia has by far the most rooftop solar capacity per capita.

== Installation ==
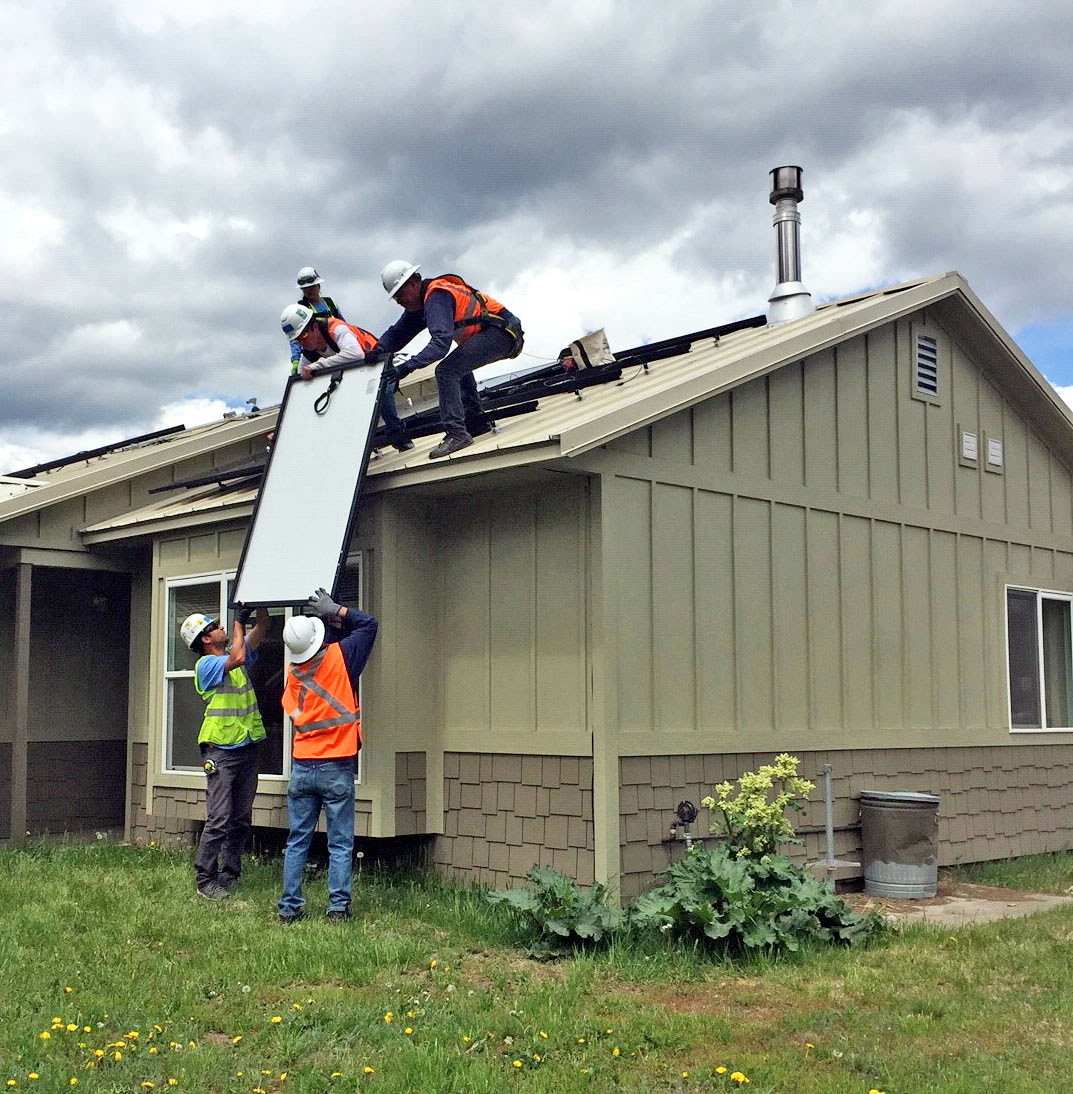
Workers install residential rooftop solar panels

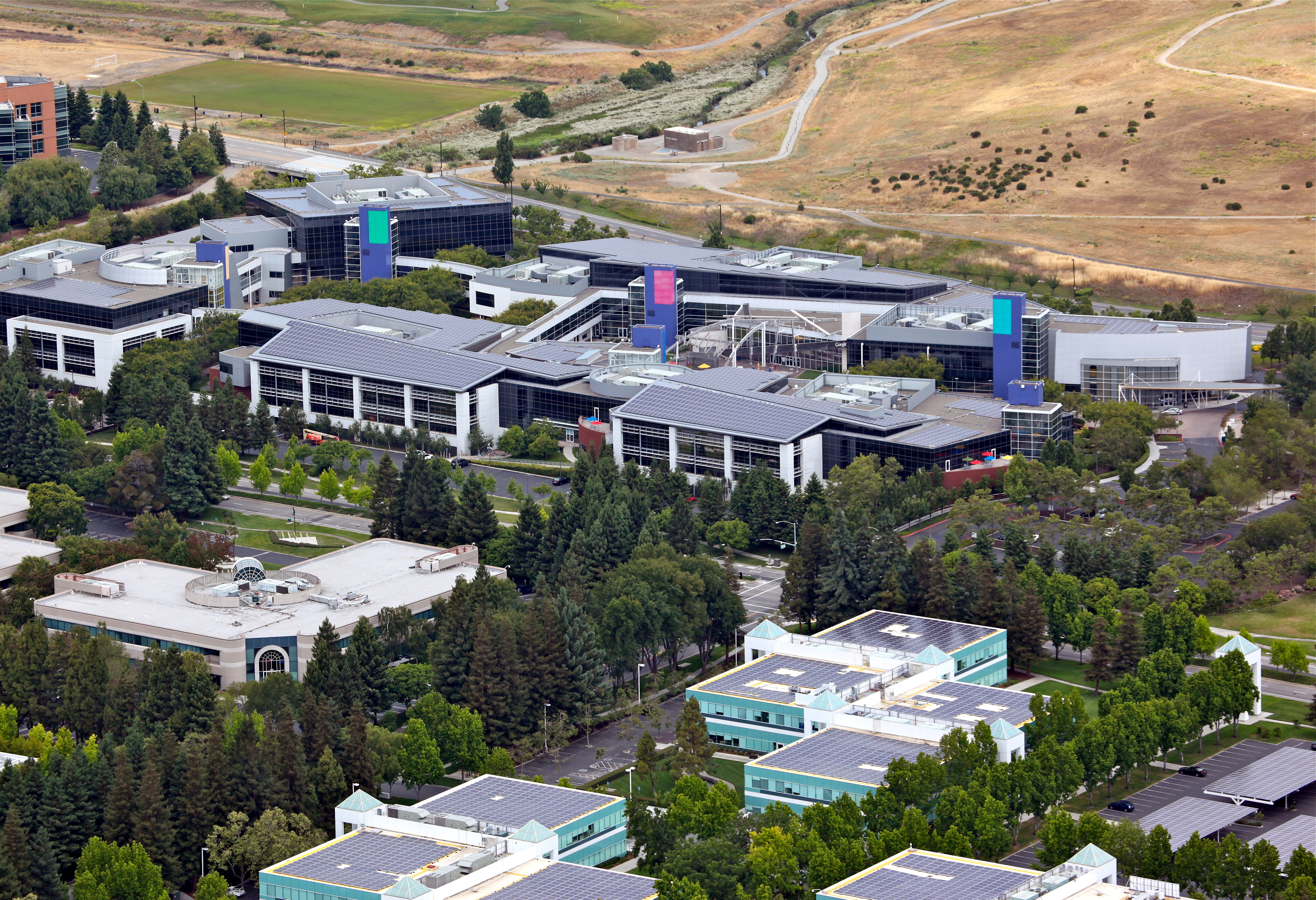
Rooftop PV systems at Googleplex, California

The urban environment provides a large amount of empty rooftop spaces and can inherently avoid the potential land use and environmental concerns. Estimating rooftop solar insolation is a multi-faceted process, as insolation values in rooftops are impacted by the following:

- Time of the year
- Latitude
- Weather conditions
- Roof slope
- Roof aspect
- Shading from adjacent buildings and vegetation

There are various methods for calculating potential solar PV roof systems including the use of lidar and orthophotos. Sophisticated models can even determine shading losses over large areas for PV deployment at the municipal level.

=== Components of a rooftop solar array ===
The following section contains the most commonly utilized components of a rooftop solar array. Though designs may vary with roof type (e.g. metal vs shingle), roof angle, and shading concerns, most arrays consist of some variation of the following components

1. Solar panels produce carbon free electricity when irradiated with sunlight. Often made of silicon, solar panels are made of smaller solar cells which typically have six cells per panel. Multiple solar panels strung together make up a solar array. Solar panels are generally protected by tempered glass and secured with an aluminum frame. The front of a solar panel is very durable whereas the back of a panel is generally more vulnerable.
2. Mounting clamps generally consist of aluminum brackets and stainless steel bolts that secure solar panels to one another on the roof and onto the rails. Clamps often vary in design in order to account for various roof and rail configurations.
3. Racking or rails are made of metal and often lie in a parallel configuration on the roof for the panels to lie on. It is important that the rails are level enough for the panels to be evenly mounted.
4. Mounts attach the rails and the entire array to the surface of the roof. These mounts are often L brackets that are bolted through flashing and into the rafters of the roof. Mounts vary in design due to the wide range of roof configurations and materials.
5. Flashings are a durable metal plate that provide a water resistant seal between the mounts and roof surface. Oftentimes, caulk is used to seal the flashing to the roof and it resembles a metal roof shingle.
6. DC/AC wiring for inverters connect wires between panels and into a micro inverter or string inverter. No cables should touch the roof surface or hang from the array to avoid weathering and the deterioration of cables.
7. Micro inverters are mounted to the underside of individual panels and convert DC power to AC power at the panel level. Because each panel operates independently, micro inverters reduce the impact of partial shading and allow panel-level performance monitoring.

== Finances ==
=== PV system prices (2022) ===
Residential
Country	Cost ($/W)
Australia	1.0
China	0.8
France	1.1
Germany	1.2
India	1.0
Italy	1.3
Japan	1.2
Pakistan	0.6
United Kingdom	1.2
United States	1.1

Commercial
Country	Cost ($/W)
Australia	0.85
China	0.64
France	0.9
Germany	0.9
India	0.75
Italy	0.9
Japan	0.95
United Kingdom	1.0
United States	1.0

=== Incentives ===
==== United States ====
Solar incentives by state in the USA can help offset the initial cost of installation and make solar power more affordable. In the United States, each state has its own set of incentives and rebates for solar energy, including tax returns, tax credits and net metering for grid connected solar power systems.

===== Property tax exemptions =====
Property tax exemptions are another form of incentive for rooftop solar in the United States. These policies generally prevent some or all of the increase in a property's value attributable to a photovoltaic system from being included in its taxable assessment. As of 2026, 36 states provide a property tax exemption for solar energy property. The scope and duration of the exemptions vary by state. Some exemptions are indefinite, while others are available only for a specified period or depend on adoption by local governments. In Wisconsin, qualifying solar energy systems are exempt from general property taxation under state law, with no specified expiration period. New York exempts the increase in assessed value attributable to qualifying solar energy systems for 15 years, subject to provisions allowing some local taxing jurisdictions to opt out. Massachusetts generally provides a 20-year exemption for qualifying solar-powered systems, with provisions allowing a longer period by agreement with the municipality.

=== Cost trends ===
Residential suburban rooftops with photovoltaic solar panels in Canberra. As of 2026, Australia has the highest penetration of residential solar power generation per capita, partially owing to government subsidies.

In the mid-2000s, solar companies used various financing plans for customers such as leases and power purchase agreements. Customers could pay for their solar panels over a span of years, and get help with payments from credits from net metering programs. As of 2026, the average cost of a residential rooftop solar system in the United States is approximately $2.60 per watt before incentives, or roughly $31,000 for a typical 12 kW system. This represents a significant decline from earlier years; in 2019, the national average was approximately $2.99/W for a 6 kW system.

, "For most people, adding a solar system on top of other bills and priorities is a luxury" and "rooftop solar companies by and large cater to the wealthier portions of the American population." Most households that get solar arrays are "upper middle-income". The average household salary for solar customers is around $100,000. However, "a surprising number of low-income" customers appeared in a study of income and solar system purchases. "Based on the findings of the study, GTM researchers estimate that the four solar markets include more than 100,000 installations at low-income properties."

A report released in June 2018 by the Consumer Energy Alliance that analyzed U.S. solar incentives, showed that a combination of federal, state and local incentives, along with the declining net cost of installing PV systems, has caused a greater usage of rooftop solar across the nation. According to Daily Energy Insider, "In 2016, residential solar PV capacity grew 20 percent over the prior year, the report said. The average installed cost of residential solar, meanwhile, dropped 21 percent to $2.84 per watt-dc in the first quarter of 2017 versus first quarter 2015." In fact, in eight states the group studied, the total government incentives for installing a rooftop solar PV system actually exceeded the cost of doing so.

As of 2026, the average cost of a residential rooftop solar system in the United States is approximately $2.60 per watt before incentives, or roughly $31,000 for a typical 12 kW system.

Due to economies of scale, industrial-sized ground-mounted solar systems produce power at half the cost (2 c/kWh) of small roof-mounted systems (4 c/kWh).

=== Feed-in tariff mechanism ===
In a grid connected rooftop photovoltaic power station, the generated electricity can sometimes be sold to the servicing electric utility for use elsewhere in the grid. This arrangement provides payback for the investment of the installer. Many consumers from across the world are switching to this mechanism owing to the revenue yielded. A public utility commission usually sets the rate that the utility pays for this electricity, which could be at the retail rate or the lower wholesale rate, greatly affecting solar power payback and installation demand.

The FIT as it is commonly known has led to an expansion in the solar PV industry worldwide. Thousands of jobs have been created through this form of subsidy. However, it can produce a bubble effect which can burst when the FIT is removed. It has also increased the ability for localized production and embedded generation reducing transmission losses through power lines.

== Solar shingles ==
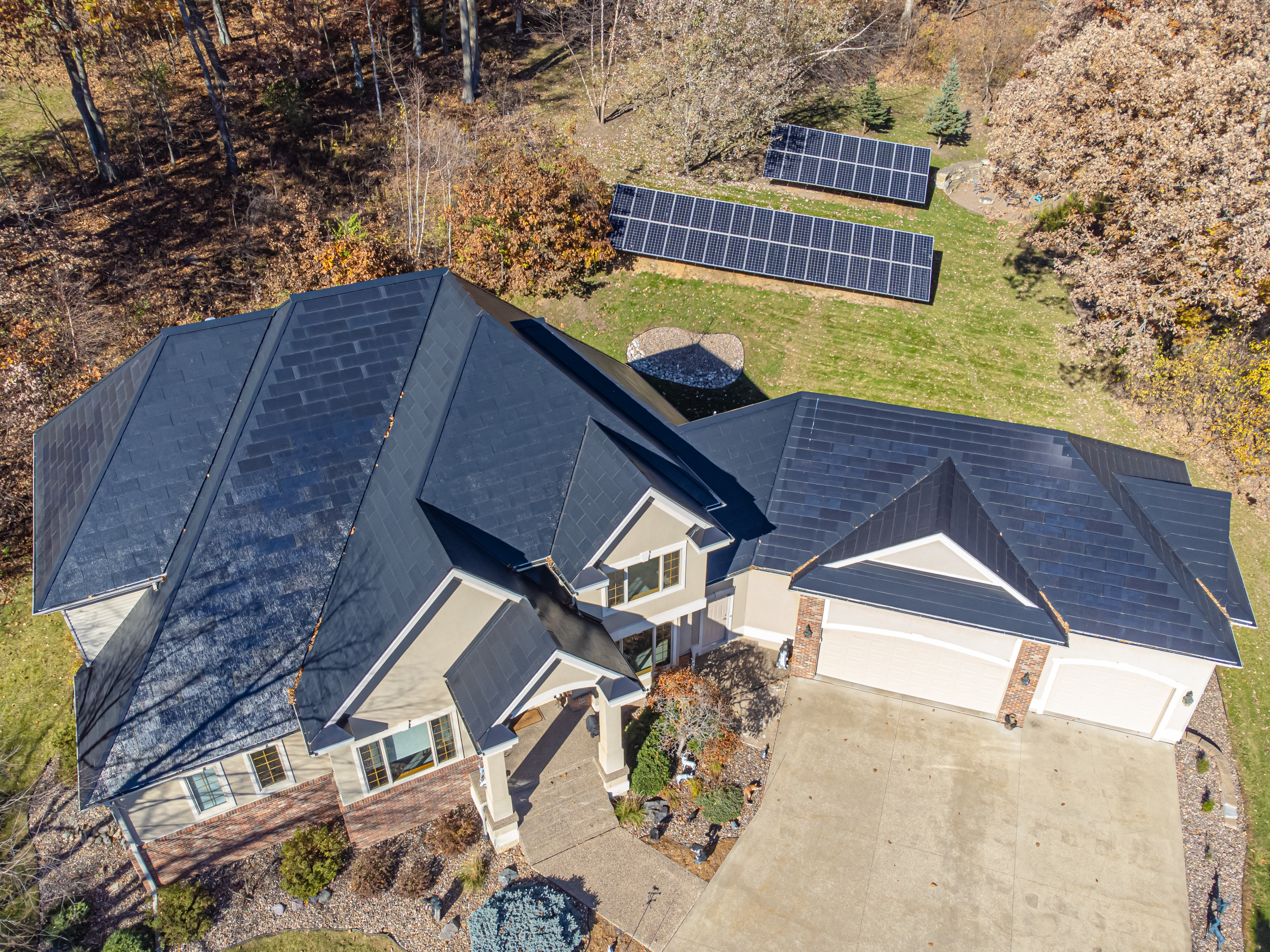
Solar shingle

Solar shingles or photovoltaic shingles, are solar panels designed to look like and function as conventional roofing materials, such as asphalt shingle or slate, while also producing electricity. Solar shingles are a type of solar energy solution known as building-integrated photovoltaics (BIPV).

== Hybrid systems ==
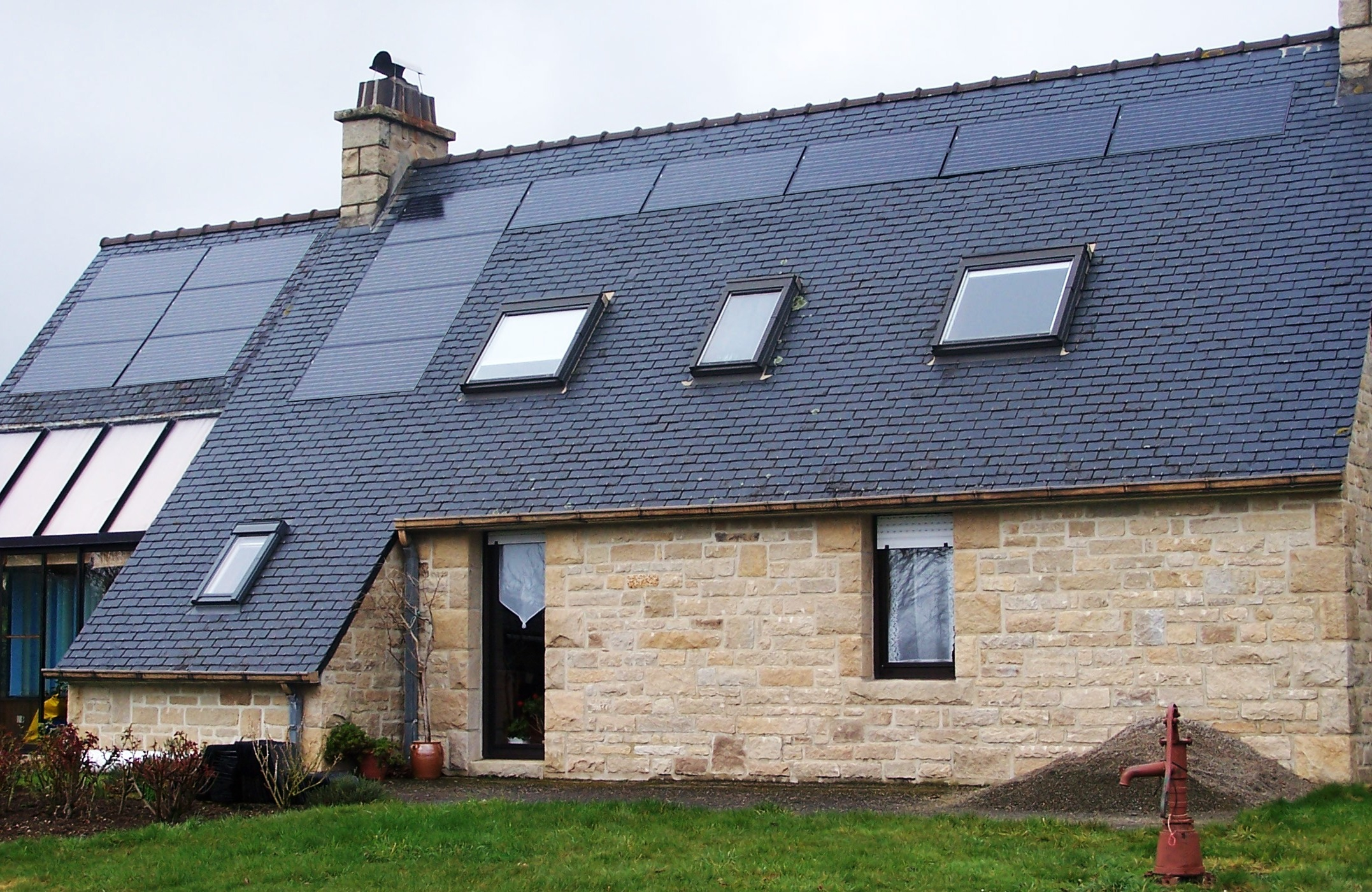
Rooftop PV hybrid system.

A rooftop photovoltaic power station (either on-grid or off-grid) can be used in conjunction with other power components like diesel generators, wind turbines, batteries etc. These solar hybrid power systems may be capable of providing a continuous source of power.

== Advantages ==
Installers have the right to feed solar electricity into the public grid and hence receive a reasonable premium tariff per generated kWh reflecting the benefits of solar electricity to compensate for the current extra costs of PV electricity. In countries with unstable or relatively expensive grid electricity, rooftop systems are also more viable.

== Disadvantages ==
An electrical power system containing a 10% contribution from PV stations would require a 2.5% increase in load-frequency control (LFC) capacity over a conventional system—an issue which may be countered by using synchronverters in the DC/AC-circuit of the PV system. The break-even cost for PV power generation was in 1996 found to be relatively high for contribution levels of less than 10%. While higher proportions of PV power generation give lower break-even costs, economic and LFC considerations impose an upper limit of about 10% on PV contributions to the overall power systems.

=== Taking solar panels down to replace shingle roof ===
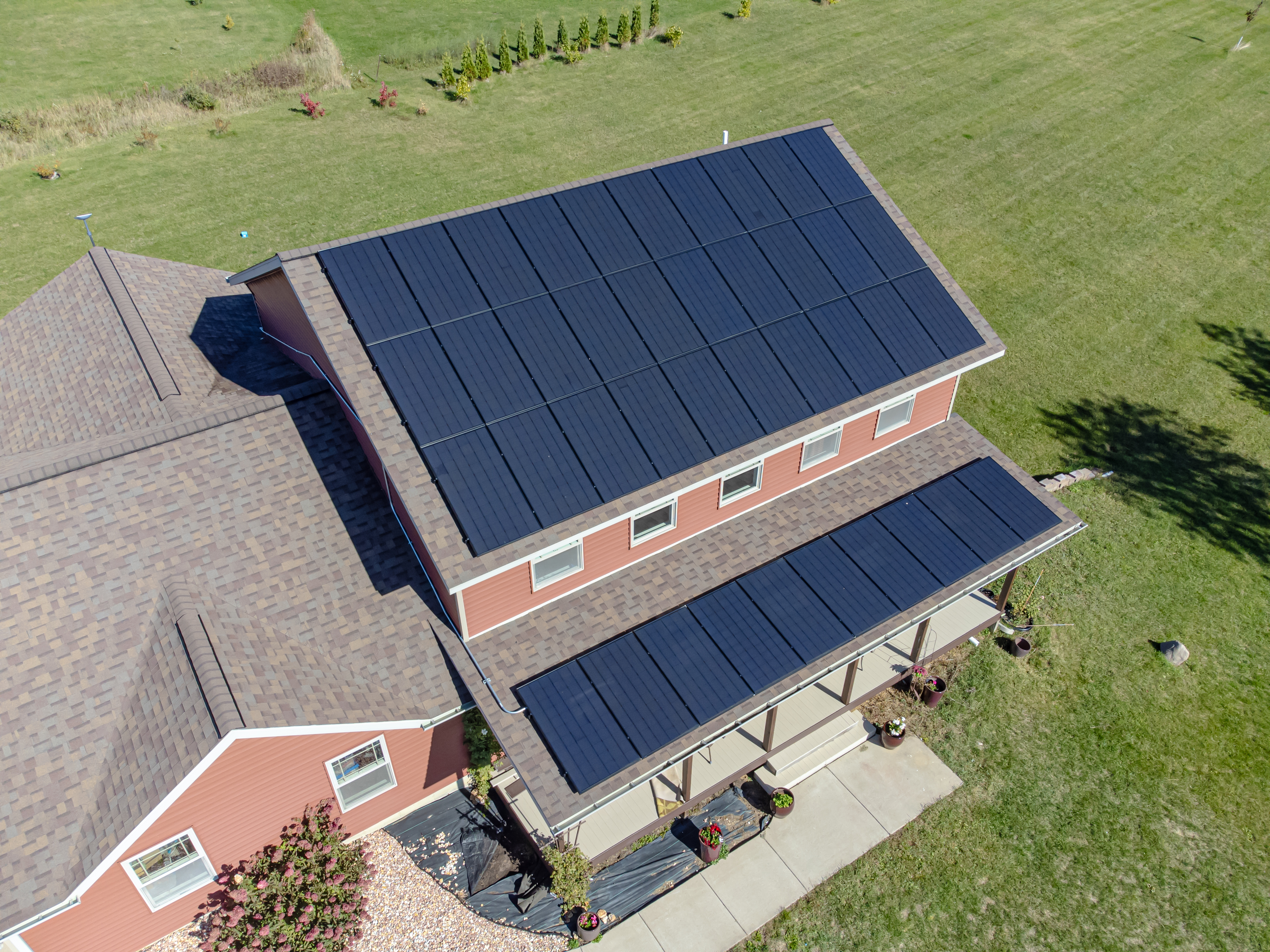
Rooftop solar on asphalt shingles

When replacing the asphalt shingle roof the solar panels will need to be uninstalled and taken down to re-shingle the roof and reinstalled after the re-shingling of the roof. Power outages could happen at the house during that time. Solar panel installers would have to come out twice to do the uninstall and re-install at a later date when the roof is finished, and their labor is typically more expensive than asphalt shingle roofers pay rate.

== Technical challenges ==
There are many technical challenges to integrating large amounts of rooftop PV systems to the power grid.

=== Reverse power flow ===
The electric power grid was not designed for two way power flow at the distribution level. Distribution feeders are usually designed as a radial system for one way power flow transmitted over long distances from large centralized generators to customer loads at the end of the distribution feeder. With localized and distributed solar PV generation on rooftops, reverse flow causes power to flow to the substation and transformer, causing significant challenges. This has adverse effects on protection coordination and voltage regulators.

=== Ramp rates ===
Rapid fluctuations of generation from PV systems due to intermittent clouds cause undesirable levels of voltage variability in the distribution feeder. At high penetration of rooftop PV, this voltage variability reduces the stability of the grid due to transient imbalance in load and generation and causes voltage and frequency to exceed set limits if not countered by power controls. That is, the centralized generators cannot ramp fast enough to match the variability of the PV systems causing frequency mismatch in the nearby system. This could lead to blackouts. This is an example of how a simple localized rooftop PV system can affect the larger power grid. The issue is partially mitigated by distributing solar panels over a wide area, and by adding storage.

=== Operation and maintenance ===
Rooftop PV solar operation and maintenance is of higher costs in comparison with ground-based facilities due to the distributed nature of rooftop facilities and harder access. In rooftop solar systems it typically takes a longer time to identify a malfunction and send a technician, due to lower availability of sufficient photovoltaic system performance monitoring tools and higher costs of human labor. As a result, rooftop solar PV systems typically suffer from lower quality of operation & maintenance and essentially lower levels of system availability and energy output.

== Thin film solar on metal roofs ==
Thin film solar running down standing seam metal roof
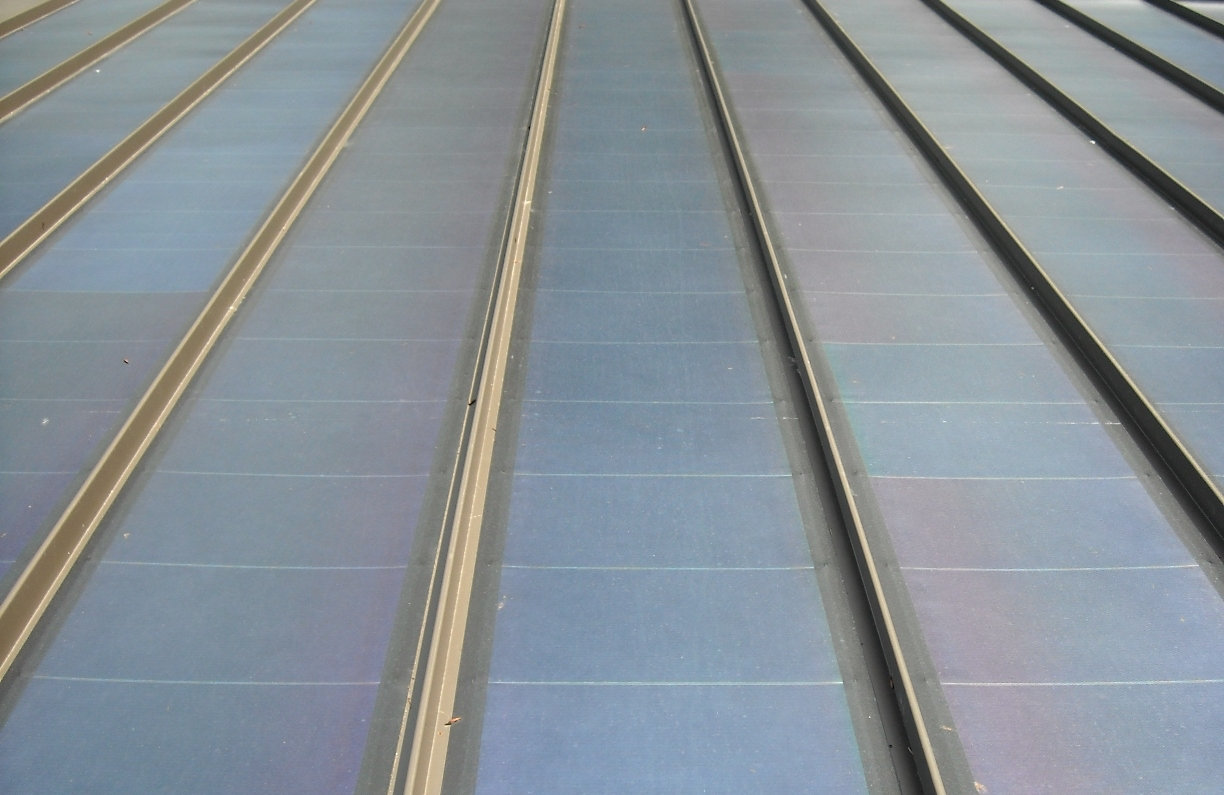
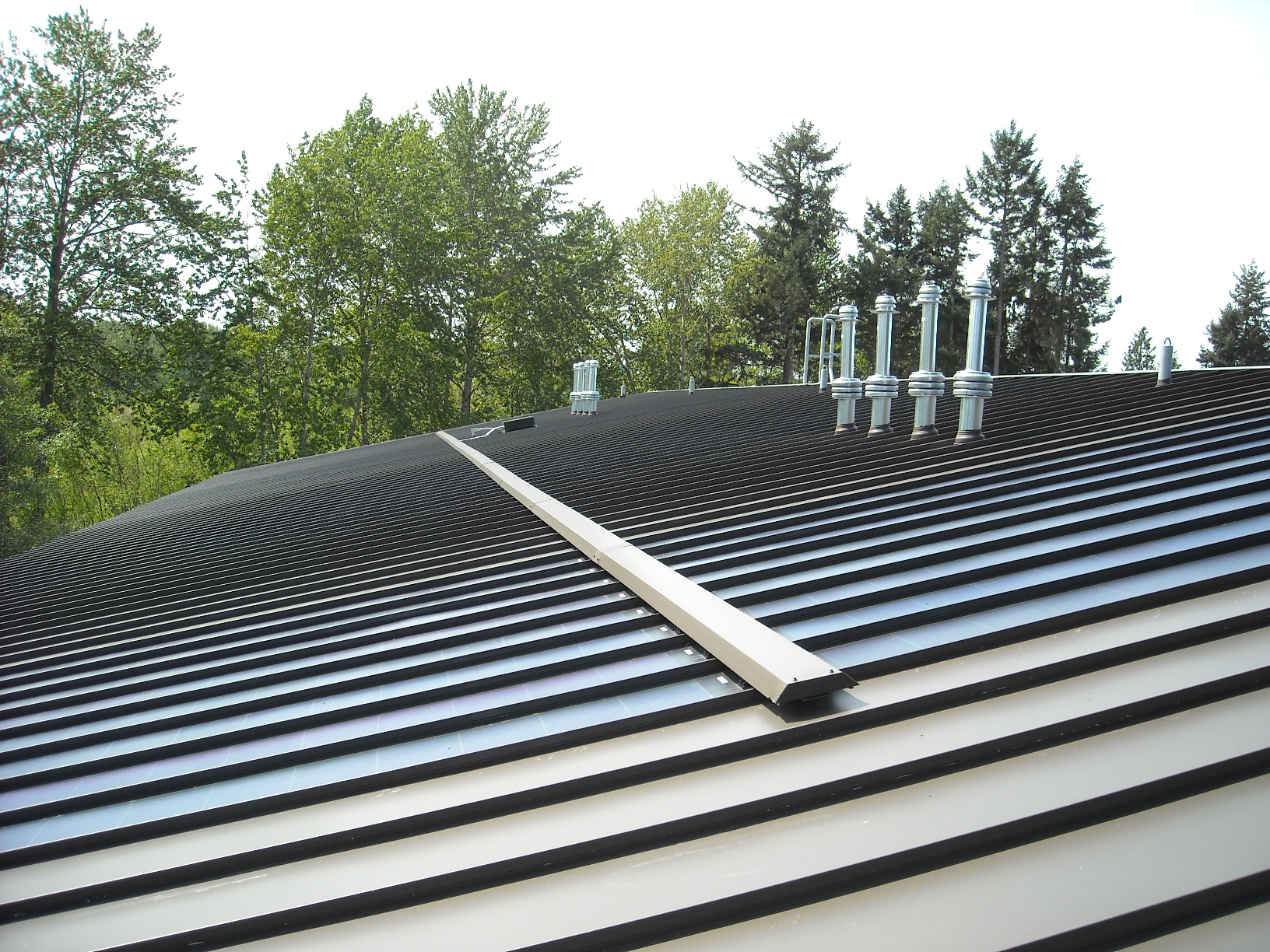

With the increasing efficiencies of thin film solar, installing them on metal roofs has become cost competitive with traditional monocrystalline and polycrystalline solar cells. The thin film panels are flexible and run down the standing seam metal roofs and stick to the metal roof with adhesive, so no holes are needed to install. The connection wires run under the ridge cap at the top of the roof. Efficiency ranges from 10–18% but only costs about $2.00–$3.00 per watt of installed capacity, compared to monocrystalline which is 17–22% efficient and costs $3.00–$3.50 per watt of installed capacity. Thin film solar is light weight at 7–10 ounces per square foot. Thin film solar panels last 10–20 years but have a quicker ROI than traditional solar panels, the metal roofs last 40–70 years before replacement compared to 12–20 years for an asphalt shingle roof.

Cost of Different Solar Roof Types
Type	Cost per watt	Efficiency	Average 6 kW system cost
Polycrystalline	$2.80–$3.00	13–17%	$17,400
Monocrystalline	$3.00–$3.50	17–22%	$19,000
Thin film panels	$2.00–$3.00	10–18%	$17,000

== Largest rooftop solar installations ==
Rooftop photovoltaic power stations (10 MW and larger)
PV power station	Location	Country	Nominal Power (MW_{p})	Notes
Jining Huaxi	Shandong	China	120	Spanned across 43 rooftops with total capacity of 110 GWh/year
LaiYih Group	Vinh Long	Vietnam	38	Rooftop of footwear manufacturing facility
Prologis Redlands Distribution Center	Redlands, California	United States	28	A series of installations on several rooftops at Prologis Redlands Distribution Center from November 2010 to August 2013 ranging from 1.75 MW to 6.77 MW
Mai Dubai Bottling Plant	Dubai	United Arab Emirates	18	52,000 solar modules, completed Summer of 2019
AG Heylen Energy	Venlo	Netherlands	18	This project at Venlo consists of over 48,000 solar modules, and over 100 inverters. 126,000 square meter of roofs is used. Installation completed in August 2020.
Apple Park	Cupertino, California	United States	17	Approx 10 MW on main building and 7 MW on two parking structures
Arvind Limited	Santej	India	16	This is the largest solar rooftop plant in India at single industrial premises. This project at Santej consists of over 46,000 solar modules, and over 180 inverters. More than 20,000 man-days were spent in installing this landmark and over 40,000 square meter of old roofs were replaced to make way for this plant.
Warehouse by Permacity / LADWP	Los Angeles, California	United States	16	
General Motors	Zaragoza	Spain	12	Installed at General Motors Spanish Zaragoza Manufacturing Plant in fall 2008
Dera Baba Jaimal Singh, Beas		India	12	Solar power plant spread over 42-acre rooftop
Riverside Renewable Energy – Holt Logistics Gloucester Marine Terminal	Gloucester City, New Jersey	United States	10	Three refrigerated warehouse buildings. Completed April 2012 with 9 MW, expanded in 2019.
Southern California Edison-Whirlpool Corporation Regional Distribution Center	Perris, California	United States	10	Installed on rooftop of Whirlpool Corporation Regional Distribution Center Sept. 19, 2011

== See also ==
- Balcony solar power
- Building-integrated photovoltaics
- Maximum power point tracker
- Photovoltaic power station
- Solar cable
- Solar inverter
- Solar shingles
- Solar tracker
- Squad Solar - Neighborhood Electric Vehicle with a solar roof
