= Solar power in France =

Overview of solar energy in France

- Installed capacity: 21 GW (2024) (14)
- Annual generation: 23 TWh (2024)
- Capacity per capita: 315 W (2024)
- Share of electricity: 4% (2024)

Solar power in France including overseas territories reached an installed capacity figure of 24.5 gigawatts (GW) at the end of 2023, up from 17.1 GW at the end of 2022 and just 11.2 GW in 2020. The country ranks 11th by solar capacity in the world and the 4th in Europe, behind Germany, Spain, and Italy. Government plans announced in 2022 foresee solar PV capacity in France rising to 100 GW by 2050.

In January 2016, the President of France, François Hollande, and the Prime Minister of India, Narendra Modi, laid the foundation stone for the headquarters of the International Solar Alliance (ISA) in Gwalpahari, Gurgaon, India. The ISA will focus on promoting and developing solar energy and solar products for countries lying wholly or partially between the Tropic of Cancer and the Tropic of Capricorn. The alliance of over 120 countries was announced at the Paris COP21 climate summit. One of the hopes of the ISA is that wider deployment will reduce production and development costs, and thus facilitate increased deployment of solar technologies, including in poor and remote regions.

== History ==
Photovoltaics installed capacity and production in France

Solar PV installations in France started being substantial only from around 2008. Between 2009 and 2011 PV capacity grew almost tenfold, from a relatively low level.

In its 2014 report "Global Market Outlook for Photovoltaics", the European Photovoltaic Industry Association (EPIA) not only blames the French government for a lack of support, but also criticizes it for having "hastily freeze or reduce support mechanisms" for further photovoltaic deployment. The EPIA also asserts that opposition from the conventional energy sector led to a negative image of PV technology in the public opinion. The French solar association SOLER urged the French government for more support and submitted a five-point plan in Spring 2014.

Solar power in France continued growing steadily and reached a cumulative photovoltaic capacity of 6.6 GW by the end of 2015, producing 6.7 TWh of electricity during the year. In 2015 France was the country with the seventh largest solar PV installed capacity in the world. Around 903 MW of new installations were added during the year.

In 2016, France was ranked 4th in the EU by installed capacity and 14th in terms of PV capacity by inhabitant at 107.3 Wp/Inhab compared to the EU average of 197.8 Wp/Inhab for the year. The country's largest completed solar park to date was the 300 MW Cestas Solar Park. Approximately 560 MW of new installations were added during the year.

In 2018, the state-owned company EDF had plans to invest up to €25 billion in PV power generation, and introduce green electricity tariffs; the plan is projected to "develop 30 gigawatt of solar capacity in France between 2020 and 2035". Similarly, Total, the giant French oil and gas company, moved in 2021 toward more significant investment in solar with the purchase of a 20% stake in Adani Green Energy, one of the world's largest solar developers.

A French law passed in 2023 will require parking lots larger than 50,000 square feet (4,600 m^{2}) to build solar canopies covering half their area. This could result in installed capacity of 6.75–11.25 gigawatts, at a cost of $8.7–14.6 billion.

In the record 4 GW of capacity installed in 2023, the share of residential systems surged to 24% over just 14% the year before.

== Solar resource ==
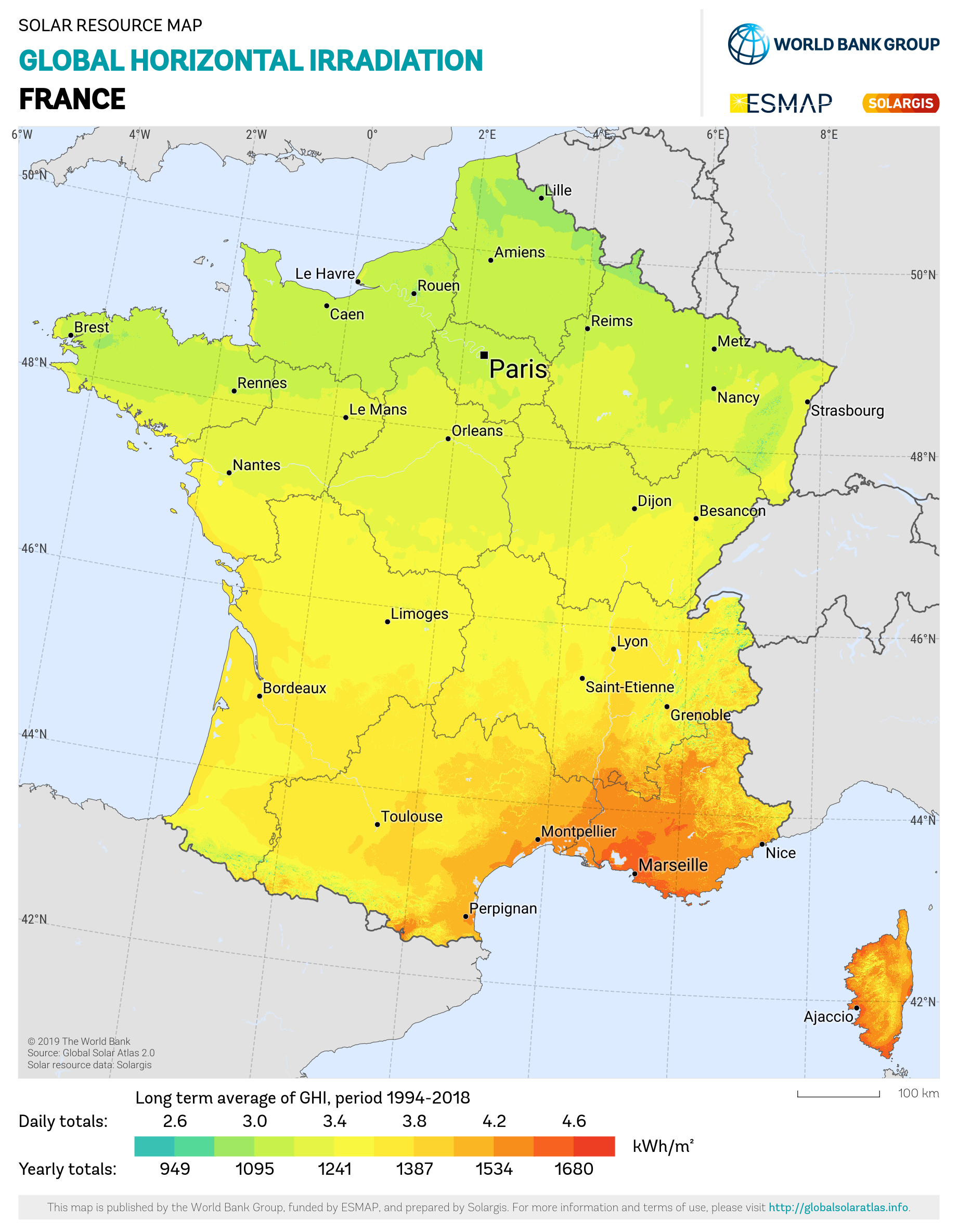
Insolation map

The insolation in France ranges from 3 sun hours/day in the north to 5 sun hours/day in the south. The output of a solar array is a function of age, temperature, tilt, shading, tracking, and insolation.

Source: NREL	Source: NREL
Source: NREL	Source: NREL

== Photovoltaic installations ==
PV capacity in watt-per-capita by region in 2013: 0–1 watt 1–10 watts 10–50 watts 50–100 watts / 100–200 watts 200–350 watts 350–500 watts

French solar power development
Year	Capacity (MW)	Watts per capita	Electricity generation %
2010	1,445	2	0.1%
2020	13,098	200	2.6%
2022	19,600	298	4.3%

== Solar PV market by segment ==
Installed capacity in France by class size 2017
<9 kW	15.9%
9–100 kW	18.6%
100–250 kW	13.8%
>250 kW	51.7%

=== Feed-in tariffs ===
France is aiming to increase its solar PV capacity from 11.5 GW in March 2021 to 23 GW by the end of 2023. The country offers feed-in tariffs for small-scale solar PV up to 100 kWp on rooftops for self-consumption, with a specific grid tariff for collective users and exemption from the domestic tax on electricity for projects under 1 MW. However, a proposal to reduce solar PV subsidies for ongoing projects until 2030 has created controversy, affecting the sector's growth despite the target of reaching 40 GW by 2028. As the number of hours with negative prices increased from 352 in 2024, to 513 in 2025, such proposal includes a change in tariff that promotes grid batteries.

=== Residential solar PV capacity ===
According to a report on behalf of the European Commission by 2020 France would have an estimated 1,484 MW of residential solar PV capacity with 458,000 residential solar PV prosumers in the country representing 1.6% of households. The average size of residential solar PV systems is estimated to be 3.24 kW moving to 2030. The technical potential for residential solar PV in France is estimated at 34,810 MW. The payback time for residential Solar PV in France is 25.1 years as of 2015. Some of the advantages of small scale residential Solar include eliminating the need for extra land, keeping cost saving advantages in local communities and empowering households to become prosumers of renewable electricity and thus raising awareness of wasteful consumption habits and environmental issues through direct experience.

=== Large photovoltaic power stations ===
Name	MWp	Departement	Location	Notes
Cestas Solar Park	300	Gironde	44°43′32″N 0°48′57″W	
Toul-Rosières Solar Park	115	Meurthe-et-Moselle	48°47′N 5°59′E	
Gabardan Solar Park	67.2	Landes	44°03′40″N 0°00′50″W	
Les Mées Solar Park	90	Alpes-de-Haute-Provence	44°01′N 6°01′E	Multiple sections
Crucey Solar Park	60	Eure-et-Loir	48°38′38″N 1°05′59″E	
Massangis Solar Park	56	Yonne	47°36′40″N 4°00′37″E	
Curbans Solar Park	33	Alpes-de-Haute-Provence	44°24′10″N 6°01′59″E	

Location map

=== Floating solar ===
A 17 MW floating solar plant was installed at Piolenc near the Rhône river in 2019.

In 2025, a 74.3 MW floating solar plant was installed at Les Ilots by Q ENERGY and Velto Renewables in the municipality of Perthes in Haute-Marne.

== See also ==
- Wind power in France
- Renewable energy in France
- Solar power in the European Union
- List of renewable energy topics by country and territory
