= Concentrated photovoltaic thermal system =

The combination of photovoltaic (PV) technology, solar thermal technology, and reflective or refractive solar concentrators has been a highly appealing option for developers and researchers since the late 1970s and early 1980s. The result is what is known as a concentrated photovoltaic thermal (CPVT) system which is a hybrid combination of concentrated photovoltaic (CPV) and photovoltaic thermal (PVT) systems.

A Concentrated Photovoltaic Thermal system (CPVT) consists of four parts including the absorber, concentrator, solar radiation tracker and thermal absorber.

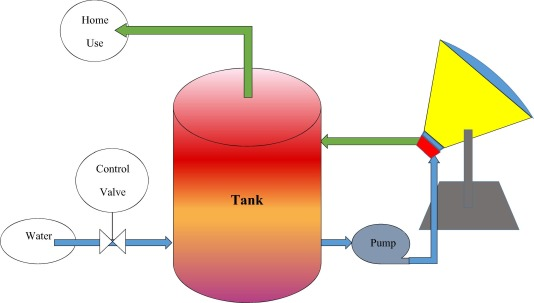
The schematic of CPVT system with active ventilation.

As the CPVT works with the beam radiation, the absorber and concentrator should follow the position of the sun to maximize the incident beam radiation. In order to concentrate the radiation, two major technologies of Fresnel lens, and parabolic concentrators can be used.

== The difference between CPV and CPVT ==
In Concentrating Photovoltaic (CPV) systems differs from PV system is the solar radiation is concentrated on the PV cells to generate additional electricity than a normal flat panel. The disadvantages of CPV system is as the intensity of the radiation increases, so does the temperature and hence decreases the electrical efficiency of the cell. The other limitations of the CPV system includes limited application scope and requirement of efficient cooling of the PV cells. To overcome the above limitations the CPV systems were modified to utilize the thermal energy and are termed as Concentrated Photovoltaic Thermal (CPVT) systems. Like CPV system, CPVT also uses low cost optical elements and compatible with multijunction cells. The area of the PV cell is reduced due to the concentration of the optical element. The heat generated on the PV cell due to the concentration of radiation is utilized for a thermal process.

== CPVT system components ==
CPVT systems comprise four parts which are as below:

=== Solar trackers ===
A solar tracker is a device that changes the position of the solar module so that the radiation can be perpendicular to the surface. In the design of the solar tracker, the position of the sun and the earth in a year period should be evaluated.

=== Reflectors ===
The conventional material for reflectors is Anodized Aluminum. However, one of the disadvantages of this is that when a large reflector is constructed, the aluminum structure begins to deviate from its main characteristic which causes a depression in the surface of the reflector.

=== Solar cells ===
Multi-junction PV cells have been proven to be particularly well suited for a concentrating system where sunlight can be focused through lenses or mirrors into a much smaller cell.

=== Ventilation ===
Two major procedures of ventilation of solar collectors are active ventilation and passive ventilation. With passive ventilation, the heat generated in the surface of the collector is transmitted to the air by heat sink. With active ventilation, the heat can be used for cooling or heating purposes. So, active ventilation converts a CPV system to a CPVT system.
