= Slewing drive =

The slewing drive is a gearbox that can safely hold radial and axial loads without brakes, as well as transmit a torque for rotating. The rotation can be in a single axis, or in multiple axes together. Slewing drives are made by manufacturing gearing, bearings, seals, housing, motor and other auxiliary components and assembling them into a finished gearbox.

== History ==
The slewing drive is a modernized take on the worm drive mechanism, which dates back many centuries and was widely used during the Renaissance Era. Pappus of Alexandria (3rd century AD), a Greek mathematician, is credited with an early version of the endless screw, which would later evolve into the worm drive. This mechanism was also used by Leonardo da Vinci as a component in many of his designs for machines. It can also be found in the notebooks of Francesco di Giorgio of Siena. Many slewing drive concepts found prominence with the emergence of larger scale construction and engineering in the height of the Greek and Roman Empires.

== Technology ==
Traditional worm gear with a 4-start worm.

Slewing drives function with standard worm technology, in which the worm on the horizontal shaft acts as the driver for the gear. The rotation of the horizontal screw turns a gear about an axis perpendicular to the screw axis. This combination reduces the speed of the driven member and also multiplies its torque; increasing it proportionally as the speed decreases. The speed ratio of shafts depends upon the relation of the number of threads on the worm to the number of teeth in the worm wheel or gear.

As technology has improved, more slewing drives are using hourglass worm technology, in which the worm is shaped to engage more teeth in the gear. This increased tooth engagement results in greater strength, efficiency and durability.

== Performance characteristics ==
Because of their multiple uses, slewing drives come in a variety of model sizes, performance ranges and mounting characteristics. The drives are well suited for applications that require both load holding and rotational torque from the same gear box. They can also be made with dual axes of rotation, (turning axes at the same time) or with dual drives on the same axis, (two worm threads driving the same ring gear in one axis).

== Materials ==
The specifications for drives and gears varies depending on the material the gear is composed of. However, a majority of the drives and gears commonly used are composed of steel and phosphor bronze. According to an extensive series of tests by the Hamilton Gear & Machine Co., chill-cast nickel-phosphor bronze ranked first in resistance to wear and deformation. Number two on the list was SAE No. 65 bronze. For bronze gears a good casting should have the following minimum physical characteristics:

Physical characteristics
Ultimate strength	Yield point
30,000 psi	12,000 psi
200 MPa	80 MPa

== Applications ==
There are many applications in which the slewing drive can be utilized, primarily because it is perfect for applications that require both load-holding power and rotational torque strength.

Typical slewing drive applications include but are not limited to:

- Cranes
- Digger derricks
- Drilling equipment
- Hydraulic machinery
- Lifts
- Man lifts
- Military equipment
- Solar trackers
- Telescopic handlers
- Wind turbines

== See also ==
- Worm gear
