= Curbans =

- Commune
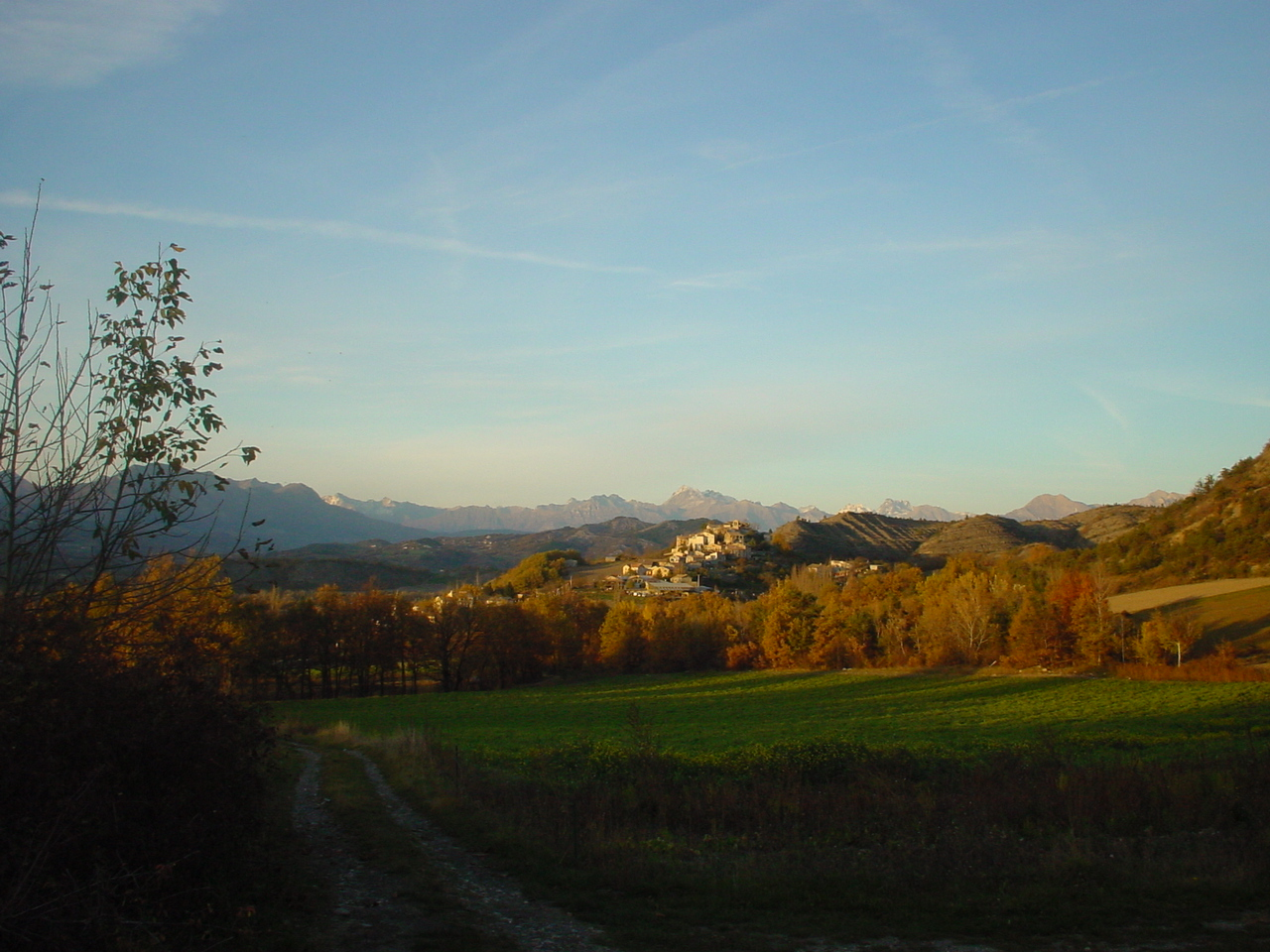
- A view of the village and the surrounding area in Curbans

- Coat of arms
- Location of Curbans
- Location within France Location within Provence-Alpes-Côte d'Azur
- Coordinates: 44°25′43″N 6°02′18″E
- Country: France
- Region: Provence-Alpes-Côte d'Azur
- Department: Alpes-de-Haute-Provence
- Arrondissement: Forcalquier
- Canton: Seyne
- Intercommunality: CA Gap-Tallard-Durance

Government
  - Mayor (2026–32): Blandine Allamanno
- Area^{1}: 28.88 km^{2} (11.15 sq mi)
- Elevation: 650 m (2,130 ft)
- Highest elevation: 1,559 m (5,115 ft)
- Lowest elevation: 544 m (1,785 ft)
- Population (2023): 575
  - Density: 19.9/km^{2} (51.6/sq mi)
- Time zone: UTC+01:00 (CET)
  - Summer (DST): UTC+02:00 (CEST)
- INSEE/Postal code: 04066 /05110
- ^{1} French Land Register data, which excludes lakes, ponds, glaciers > 1 km^{2} (0.386 sq mi or 247 acres) and river estuaries.

Curbans (French pronunciation: [kyʁbɑ̃]) is a commune in the Alpes-de-Haute-Provence department in southeastern France.

== Population ==
Historical population
Year	Pop.	±% p.a.
1968	136	—
1975	119	−1.89%
1982	164	+4.69%
1990	241	+4.93%
1999	292	+2.16%
2007	361	+2.69%
2012	483	+6.00%
2017	575	+3.55%
2023	575	+0.00%
Source: INSEE

== See also ==
- Communes of the Alpes-de-Haute-Provence department
- Curbans Solar Park
