= Roland Mösl =

Austrian computer programmer (born 1958)

Roland Mösl (born July 9, 1958) is a former Austrian computer programmer.

== Life ==
Mösl was born in Innsbruck. He worked out the concept of the Gemini house in 1991 and wrote the book "Aufstieg zum Solarzeitalter" (Advance to solar age) about this project. He was awarded with the Gusi Peace Prize November 24, 2011 in Manila.

== Political positions ==
His political main target since 2004 is a revenue neutral CO_{2} tax.

He applied December 7, 2013 in the NEOS pre election for the European parliament May 2014. He was end of February 2014 removed from the list.

He registered December 31. 2014 the WWW movement WorldWide Wealth as a political party at the Austrian administration. German name "WWW Bewegung WeltWeiter Wohlstand". This movement is strongly opposed to ideologies and promotes to find the best way for a best possible survival of mankind by a new science promoted as "Ethics - the science of survival".

The philosophical background of this new movement is Infinitism - a civilization can create an unlimited ability to survive. An organization to promote Infinitism was registered March 2015 at the Austrian administration.

He started summer 2016 a parliamentarian citizen initiative in Austria "Unleash investment avalanche - trigger economic boom".
