= Gabardan Solar Park =

Photovoltaic power station in France

- Country: France
- Location: Landes
- Coordinates: 44°03′40″N 0°00′50″W
- Status: Operational
- Commission date: 2009-2011
- Owner: EDF Énergies Nouvelles

Solar farm
- Type: Flat-panel PV

Power generation
- Nameplate capacity: 67.5 MW

The Gabardan Solar Park is a 67.5 megawatt (MW) photovoltaic power station in France. It has about 872,300 thin-film PV panels made by First Solar, and incorporates a 2 MW pilot plant using 11,100 solar trackers.

== See also ==
- Photovoltaic power stations
- List of largest power stations in the world
- List of photovoltaic power stations
