= Gemini house =

Rotating solar house in Weiz, Austria

Coordinates: 47°13′09″N 15°37′31″E

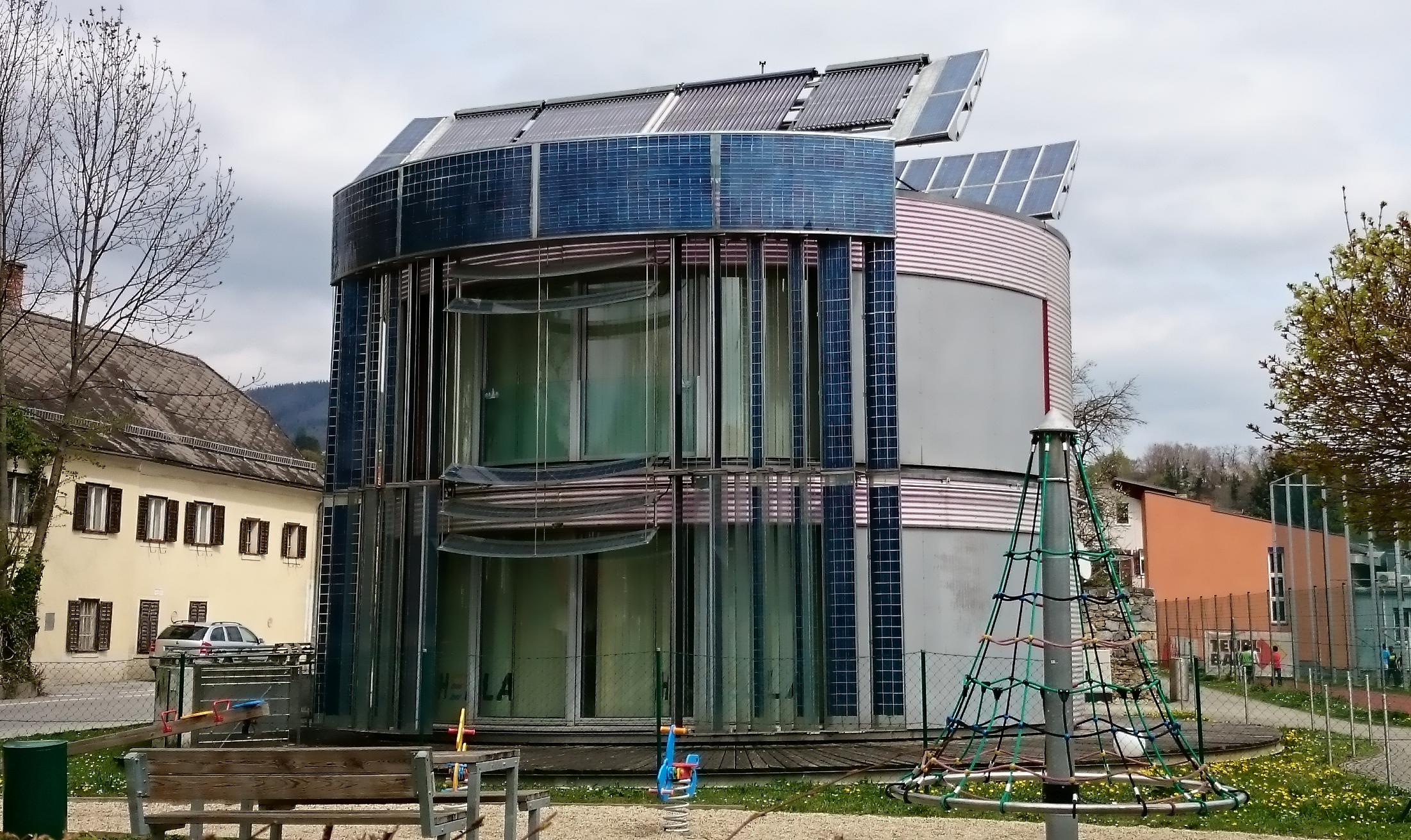
The Geminihaus in Weiz rotates in its entirety and the solar panels rotate independently

The Gemini house is a prototype design for a house that uses solar energy and efficient design.

Roland Mösl wrote the house's concept in autumn 1991. The name expresses a design goal: The real estate used should serve two purposes simultaneously -- living and generating solar electricity. Ten years later, in 2001, the (up to now) only prototype was built in Weiz, a small town north of Graz in Austria as part of a national exhibition about energy. The cylindric house rotates to follow the sun. It is equipped with up to 150m² of photovoltaic panels. Extreme thermal insulation and heat recovery from waste air are also included.
