= Curbans Solar Park =

Solar farm near Curbans, in France

- Official name: Parc Solaire Curbans
- Country: France
- Location: Curbans
- Coordinates: 44°24′10″N 6°01′59″E
- Commission date: 2011
- Construction cost: €80 million

Solar farm
- Type: Flat-panel PV
- Site area: 321 acres (129.9 ha)

Power generation
- Units operational: 145,000
- Nameplate capacity: 33 MW
- Capacity factor: 15.0%
- Annual net output: 43.5 GW·h

Curbans Solar Park is a 33 MW solar farm near Curbans, France. It has 145,000 Yingli PV panels and is at an altitude of 1000 m.

== See also ==
- Photovoltaic power stations
- List of largest power stations in the world
- List of photovoltaic power stations
