= Solar tracker =

Device that orients a payload towards the Sun

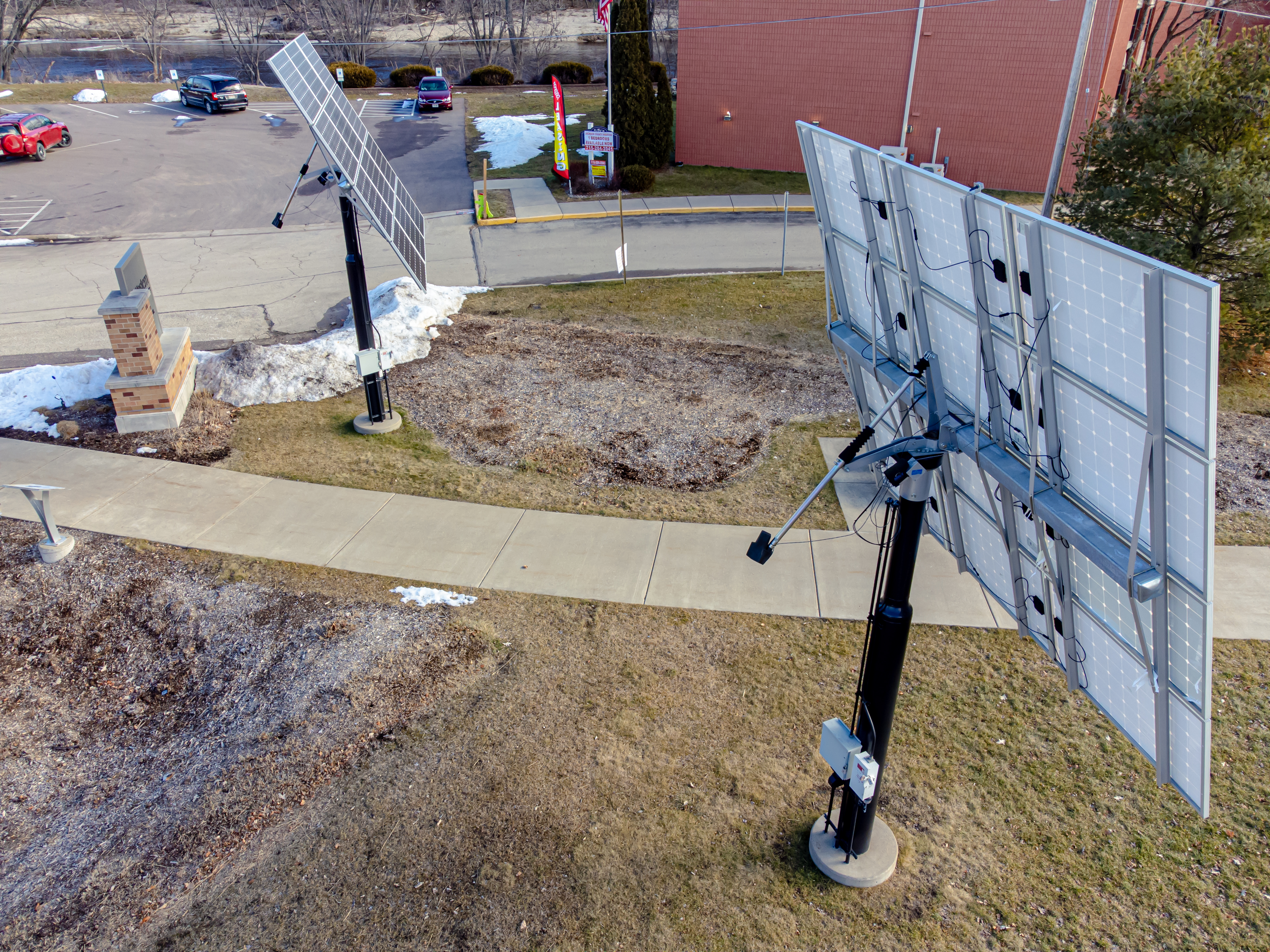
Dual axis solar trackers

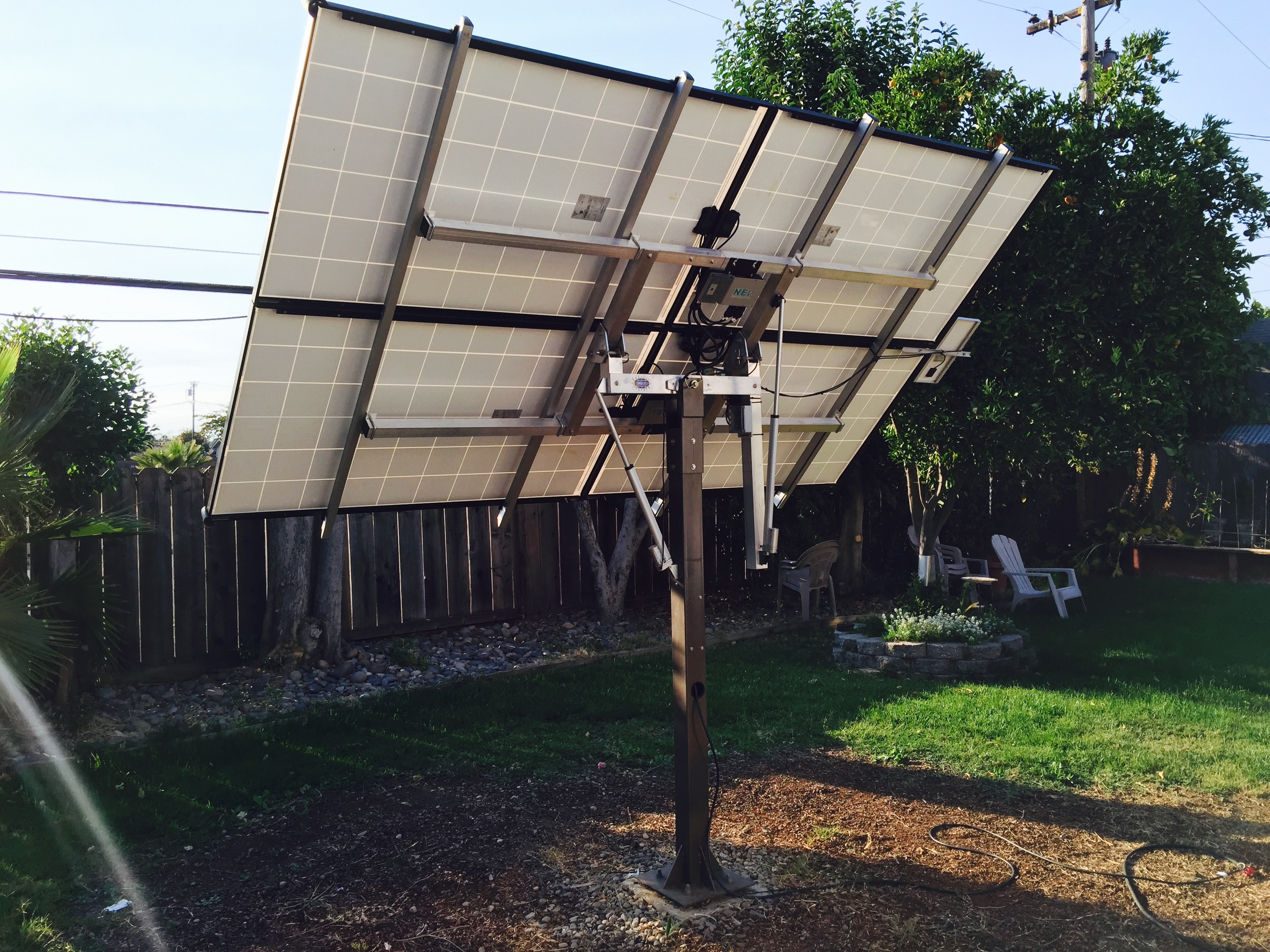
Suntactics dual-axis solar trackers are used for small for medium-sized solar production farms. Useful for small business solar power and battery charging.

A solar tracker is a device that orients a payload toward the Sun. Payloads are usually solar panels, parabolic troughs, Fresnel reflectors, lenses, or the mirrors of a heliostat.

For flat-panel photovoltaic systems, trackers are used to minimize the angle of incidence between the incoming sunlight and a photovoltaic panel, sometimes known as the cosine error. Reducing this angle increases the amount of energy produced from a fixed amount of installed power-generating capacity.

As the pricing, reliability, and performance of single-axis trackers have improved, the systems have been installed in an increasing percentage of utility-scale projects. The global solar tracker market was 14 gigawatts in 2017 73 GW in 2022, and 94 GW in 2023. By 2024 the solar tracker market was 111 GW and 99% of new utility-scale solar projects used single-axis tracking due to lower LCoE. By contrast, fixed-tilt was primarily used in places with difficult terrain, brownfields, or high winds.

In concentrator photovoltaics (CPV) and concentrated solar power (CSP) applications, trackers are used to enable the optical components in the CPV and CSP systems. The optics in concentrated solar applications accept the direct component of sunlight light and therefore must be oriented appropriately to collect energy. Tracking systems are found in all concentrator applications because such systems collect the sun's energy with maximum efficiency when the optical axis is aligned with incident solar radiation.

== Basic concept ==
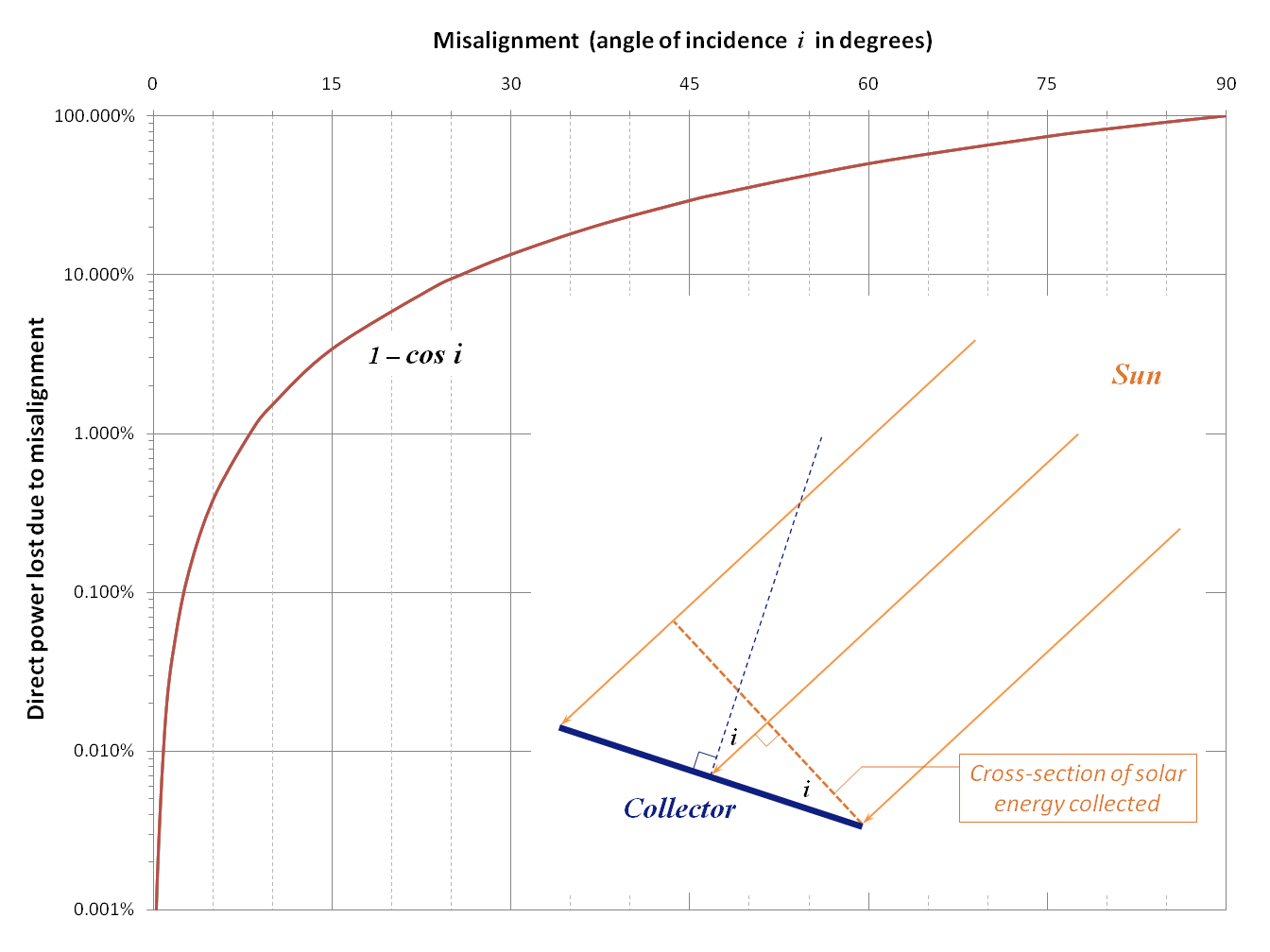
The effective collection area of a flat-panel solar collector varies with the cosine of the misalignment of the panel with the Sun.

Sunlight has two components: the "direct beam" that carries about 90% of the solar energy and the "diffuse sunlight" that carries the remainder – the diffuse portion is the blue sky on a clear day, and is a larger proportion of the total on cloudy days. As the majority of the energy is in the direct beam, maximizing collection requires the Sun to be visible to the panels for as long as possible. However, on cloudier days the ratio of direct vs. diffuse light can be as low as 60:40 or even lower.

The energy contributed by the direct beam drops off with the cosine of the angle between the incoming light and the panel. In addition, the reflectance (averaged across all polarizations) is approximately constant for angles of incidence up to around 50°, beyond which reflectance increases rapidly.

Direct power loss (%) due to misalignment (angle i) where Loss = 1 − cos(i)
Angle i	Hours (Note: Hours of rotation away from a time (e.g. noon) when the collector is accurately aligned.)	Loss
0°		0%
1°		0.015%
3°		0.14%
8°		1%
15°	1	3.4%
23.4° (Note: Maximum seasonal variation (at summer or winter solstice), as compared with accurate alignment at equinox.)		8.3%
30°	2	13.4%
45°	3	30%
60°	4	>50% (Note: Greater due to higher reflectance at high angles of incidence.)
75°	5	>75%

Notes

For example, trackers that have accuracies of ± 5° can capture more than 99.6% of the energy delivered by the direct beam plus 100% of the diffuse light. As a result, high-accuracy tracking is not typically used in non-concentrating PV applications.

The purpose of a tracking mechanism is to follow the Sun as it moves across the sky. In the following sections, in which each of the main factors are described in a little more detail, the complex path of the Sun is simplified by considering its daily east-west motion separately from its yearly north-south variation with the seasons of the year.

=== Solar energy intercepted ===
The amount of solar energy available for collection from the direct beam is the amount of light intercepted by the panel. This is given by the area of the panel multiplied by the cosine of the angle of incidence of the direct beam (see illustration above). Put another way, the energy intercepted is equivalent to the area of the shadow cast by the panel onto a surface perpendicular to the direct beam.

This cosine relationship is very closely related to the observation formalized in 1760 by Lambert's cosine law. This describes that the observed brightness of an object is proportional to the cosine of the angle of incidence of the light illuminating it.

=== Reflective losses ===
Variation of reflectance with angle of incidence. These graphs are for a refractive index of 1.5 (glass) and are not applicable to bare silicon.

Not all of the intercepted light is transmitted into the panel; some is reflected at its surface. The amount reflected depends on both the refractive index of the surface material and the angle of incidence of the incoming light. The amount reflected also differs depending on the polarization of the incoming light. Incoming sunlight is a mixture of all polarizations, with equal amounts in direct sunlight. Averaged over all polarizations, the reflective losses are approximately constant at angles of incidence up to around 50°, beyond which they increase rapidly. See for example the accompanying graph, appropriate for glass.

Solar panels are often coated with an anti-reflective coating, which is one or more thin layers of substances with refractive indices intermediate between those of silicon and air. This causes destructive interference in the reflected light, diminishing the reflected amount. Photovoltaic manufacturers have been working to decrease reflectance with improved anti-reflective coatings and with textured glass.

=== Daily east-west motion of the Sun ===
The Sun travels through 360° east to west per day, but from the perspective of any fixed location, the visible portion is 180° during an average half-day period (more in summer, slightly less in spring and fall, and significantly less in winter). Local horizon effects reduce this somewhat, making the effective motion about 150°. A solar panel in a fixed orientation between the dawn and sunset extremes will see a motion of 75° to either side, and thus, according to the table above, will lose over 75% of the energy in the morning and evening. Rotating the panels to the east and west can help recapture those losses. A tracker that only attempts to compensate for the east-west movement of the Sun is known as a single-axis tracker.

=== Seasonal north-south motion of the Sun ===
Due to the tilt of the Earth's axis, the Sun also moves through 46° north and south during a year. The same set of panels set at the midpoint between the two local extremes will thus see the Sun move 23° on either side. Thus according to the above table, an optimally aligned single-axis tracker (see polar aligned tracker below) will only lose 8.3% at the summer and winter seasonal extremes, or around 5% averaged over a year. Conversely a vertically- or horizontally-aligned single-axis tracker will lose considerably more as a result of these seasonal variations in the Sun's path. For example, a vertical tracker at a site at 60° latitude will lose up to 40% of the available energy in summer, while a horizontal tracker located at 25° latitude will lose up to 33% in winter.

A tracker that accounts for both the daily and seasonal motions is known as a dual-axis tracker. Generally speaking, the losses due to seasonal angle changes are complicated by changes in the length of the day, increasing collection in the summer in northern or southern latitudes. This biases collection toward the summer, so if the panels are tilted closer to the average summer angles, the total yearly losses are reduced compared to a system tilted at the spring/fall equinox angle (which is the same as the site's latitude).

There is considerable argument within the industry about whether the small difference in yearly collection between single- and dual-axis trackers makes the added complexity of a two-axis tracker worthwhile. A recent review of actual production statistics from southern Ontario suggested the difference was about 4% in total, which was far less than the added costs of the dual-axis systems. This compares unfavorably with the 24–32% improvement between a fixed-array and single-axis tracker.

=== Other factors ===
==== Clouds ====
The above models assume uniform likelihood of cloud cover at different times of day or year. In different climate zones cloud cover can vary with seasons, affecting the averaged performance figures described above. Alternatively, for example in an area where cloud cover on average builds up during the day, there can be particular benefits in collecting morning sun.

==== Atmosphere ====
The distance that sunlight travels through the atmosphere increases as the sun approaches the horizon, as the sunlight travels diagonally through the atmosphere. As the path length through the atmosphere increases, the solar intensity reaching the collector decreases. This increasing path length is referred to as the air mass (AM) or air mass coefficient, where AM0 is at the top of the atmosphere, AM1 refers to the direct vertical path down to sea-level with Sun overhead, and AM greater than 1 refers to diagonal paths as the Sun approaches the horizon.

Even though the sun may not feel particularly hot in the early mornings or during the winter months, the diagonal path through the atmosphere has a less than expected impact on the solar intensity. Even when the sun is only 15° above the horizon the solar intensity can be around 60% of its maximum value, around 50% at 10° and 25% at only 5° above the horizon. Therefore, if trackers can follow the Sun from horizon to horizon, then their solar panels can collect a significant amount of energy.

==== Solar cell efficiency ====
The underlying power conversion efficiency of a photovoltaic cell has a major influence on the end result, regardless of whether tracking is employed.

==== Temperature ====
Photovoltaic solar cell efficiency decreases with increasing temperature, at the rate of about 0.4%/°C. For example, there is about 20% higher efficiency at 10 °C in early morning or winter than at 60 °C in the heat of the day or summer. Therefore, trackers can deliver additional benefit by collecting early morning and winter energy when the cells are operating at their highest efficiency.

=== Summary ===
Trackers for concentrating collectors must employ high-accuracy tracking so as to keep the collector at the focus point.

Trackers for non-concentrating flat-panel do not need high accuracy tracking:

- low power loss: under 10% loss even at 25° misalignment
- reflectance consistent even to around 50° misalignment
- diffuse sunlight contributes 10% independent of orientation, and a larger proportion on cloudy days.

The benefits of tracking non-concentrating flat-panel collectors flow from the following:

- power loss rises rapidly beyond about 30° misalignment
- significant power is available even when the Sun is very close to the horizon, e.g. around 60% of full power at 15° above the horizon, around 50% at 10°, and even 25% at only 5° above the horizon – of particular relevance at high latitudes and/or during the winter months
- photovoltaic panels are around 20% more efficient in the cool of the early mornings as compared with during the heat of the day; similarly, they are more efficient in winter than summer – and effectively capturing early morning and winter sun requires tracking.

== Types of solar collector ==
Solar collectors may be non-concentrating flat-panels, usually photovoltaic or hot-water, or concentrating systems, of a variety of types.

Solar collector mounting systems may be fixed (manually aligned) or tracking. Different types of solar collector and their location (latitude) require different types of tracking mechanism. Tracking systems may be configured as a fixed collector / moving mirror – a Heliostat – or as a moving collector

=== Non-tracking fixed mount ===
Residential and small-capacity commercial or industrial rooftop solar panels and solar water heater panels are usually fixed, often flush-mounted on an appropriately-facing pitched roof. Advantages of fixed mounts over trackers include the following:

- Mechanical Advantages: Simple to manufacture, lower installation and maintenance costs.
- Wind-loading: it is easier and cheaper to provision a sturdy mount; all mounts other than fixed flush-mounted panels must be carefully designed having regard to wind loading due to greater exposure.
- Indirect light: approximately 10% of the incident solar radiation is diffuse light, available at any angle of misalignment with the Sun.
- Tolerance to misalignment: effective collection area for a flat panel is relatively insensitive to quite high levels of misalignment with the Sun – see the table and diagram at Basic concept section above – for example even a 25° misalignment reduces the direct solar energy collected by less than 10%.

Fixed mounts are usually used in conjunction with non-concentrating systems; however, an important class of non-tracking concentrating collectors, of particular value in the third world, are portable solar cookers. These use relatively low levels of concentration, typically around 2 to 8 Suns and are manually aligned.

=== Trackers ===
Even though a fixed flat panel can be set to collect a high proportion of available noon-time energy, significant power is also available in the early mornings and late afternoons when the misalignment with a fixed panel becomes too excessive to collect a reasonable proportion of the available energy. For example, even when the Sun is only 10° above the horizon, the available energy can be around half the noon-time energy levels (or even greater depending on latitude, season, and atmospheric conditions).

Thus the primary benefit of a tracking system is to collect solar energy for the longest period of the day, and with the most accurate alignment as the Sun's position shifts with the seasons.

In addition, the greater the level of concentration employed, the more important accurate tracking becomes, because the proportion of energy derived from direct radiation is higher, and the region where that concentrated energy is focused becomes smaller.

==== Fixed collector / moving mirror ====
Many collectors cannot be moved, such as high-temperature collectors where the energy is recovered as hot liquid or gas (e.g. steam). Other examples include direct heating and lighting of buildings and fixed in-built solar cookers, such as Scheffler reflectors. In such cases it is necessary to employ a moving mirror so that, regardless of where the Sun is positioned in the sky, the Sun's rays are redirected onto the collector.

Due to the complicated motion of the Sun across the sky, and the level of precision required to correctly aim the Sun's rays onto the target, a heliostat mirror generally employs a dual axis tracking system, with at least one axis mechanized. In different applications, mirrors may be flat or concave.

==== Moving collector ====
Trackers can be grouped into classes by the number and orientation of the tracker's axes. Compared to a fixed mount, a single-axis tracker increases annual output by approximately 30%, and a dual axis tracker an additional 10–20%.

Photovoltaic trackers can be classified into two types: standard photovoltaic (PV) trackers and concentrated photovoltaic (CPV) trackers. Each of these tracker types can be further categorized by the number and orientation of their axes, their actuation architecture and drive type, their intended applications, their vertical supports, and foundation.

===== Floating mount =====
Floating islands of solar panels are being installed on reservoirs and lakes in the Netherlands, China, the UK, and Japan. The sun-tracking system controlling the direction of the panels operates automatically according to the time of year, changing position by means of ropes attached to buoys.

===== Floating ground mount =====
Solar trackers can be built using a "floating" foundation, which sits on the ground without the need for invasive concrete foundations. Instead of placing the tracker on concrete foundations, the tracker is placed on a gravel pan that can be filled with a variety of materials, such as sand or gravel, to secure the tracker to the ground. These "floating" trackers can sustain the same wind load as a traditional fixed mounted tracker. The use of floating trackers increases the number of potential sites for commercial solar projects since they can be placed on top of capped landfills or in areas where excavated foundations are not feasible.

===== Motion-Free Optical Tracking =====
Solar trackers can be built without the need for mechanical tracking equipment. These are called motion-free optical tracking. Renkube pioneered a glass based design to redirect light using motion-free optical tracking technology.

== Non-concentrating photovoltaic (PV) trackers ==
Photovoltaic panels accept both direct and diffuse light from the sky. The panels on standard photovoltaic trackers gather both the available direct and diffuse light. The tracking functionality in standard photovoltaic trackers is used to minimize the angle of incidence between incoming light and the photovoltaic panel. This increases the amount of energy gathered from the direct component of the incoming sunlight.

The physics behind standard photovoltaic trackers works with all standard photovoltaic module technologies. These include all types of crystalline silicon panels (either mono-Si, or multi-Si) and all types of thin film panels (amorphous silicon, CdTe, CIGS, microcrystalline).

== Concentrator photovoltaic (CPV) trackers ==
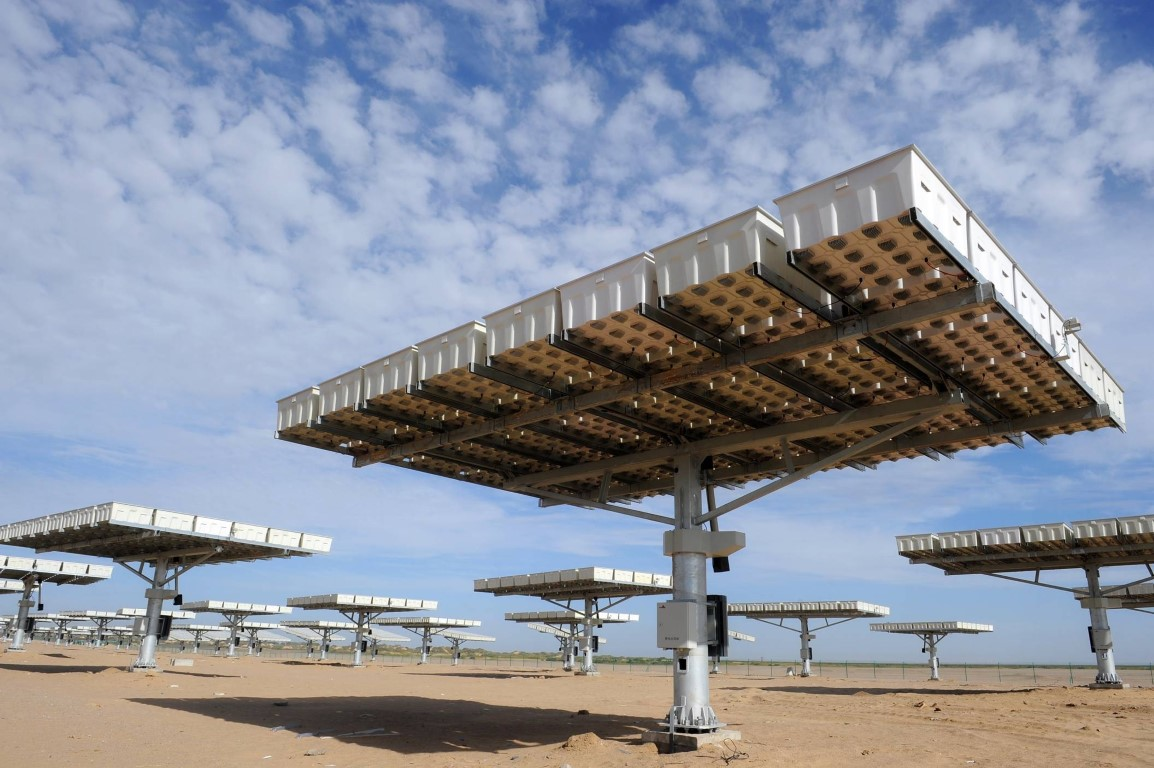
3-megawatt CPV plant using dual axis trackers in Golmud, China

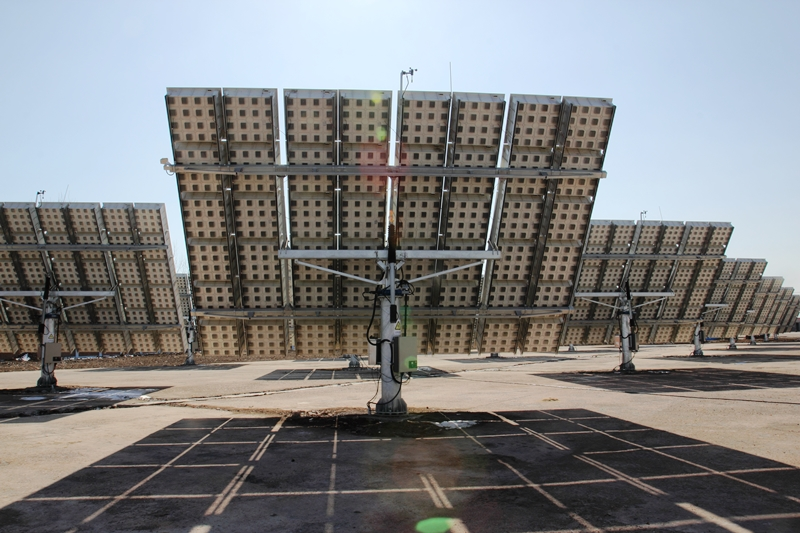
200-kilowatt CPV modules on dual axis tracker in Qingdao, China

The optics in CPV modules accept the direct component of the incoming light and therefore must be oriented appropriately to maximize the energy collected. In low-concentration applications, a portion of the diffuse light from the sky can also be captured. The tracking functionality in CPV modules is used to orient the optics such that the incoming light is focused to a photovoltaic collector.

CPV modules that concentrate in one dimension must be tracked normal to the Sun in one axis. CPV modules that concentrate in two dimensions must be tracked normal to the Sun in two axes.

Accuracy requirements

The physics behind CPV optics requires that tracking accuracy increases as the system's concentration ratio increases. However, for a given concentration, nonimaging optics provide the widest possible acceptance angles, which may be used to reduce tracking accuracy.

In typical high-concentration systems, tracking accuracy must be in the ± 0.1° range to deliver approximately 90% of the rated power output. In low concentration systems, tracking accuracy must be in the ± 2.0° range to deliver 90% of the rated power output. As a result, high-accuracy tracking systems are typical.

Technologies supported

Concentrated photovoltaic trackers are used with refractive and reflective concentrator systems. There are a range of emerging photovoltaic cell technologies used in these systems. These range from conventional, crystalline-silicon-based photovoltaic receivers to germanium-based triple junction receivers.

== Single-axis trackers ==
Single-axis trackers have one degree of freedom that acts as an axis of rotation. The axis of rotation of single-axis trackers is typically aligned along a true North meridian. It is possible to align them in any cardinal direction with advanced tracking algorithms. There are several common implementations of single-axis trackers. These include horizontal single-axis trackers (HSAT), horizontal single-axis tracker with tilted modules (HTSAT), vertical single-axis trackers (VSAT), tilted single-axis trackers (TSAT), and polar-aligned single-axis trackers (PSAT). The orientation of the module with respect to the tracker axis is important when modeling performance.

=== Horizontal ===
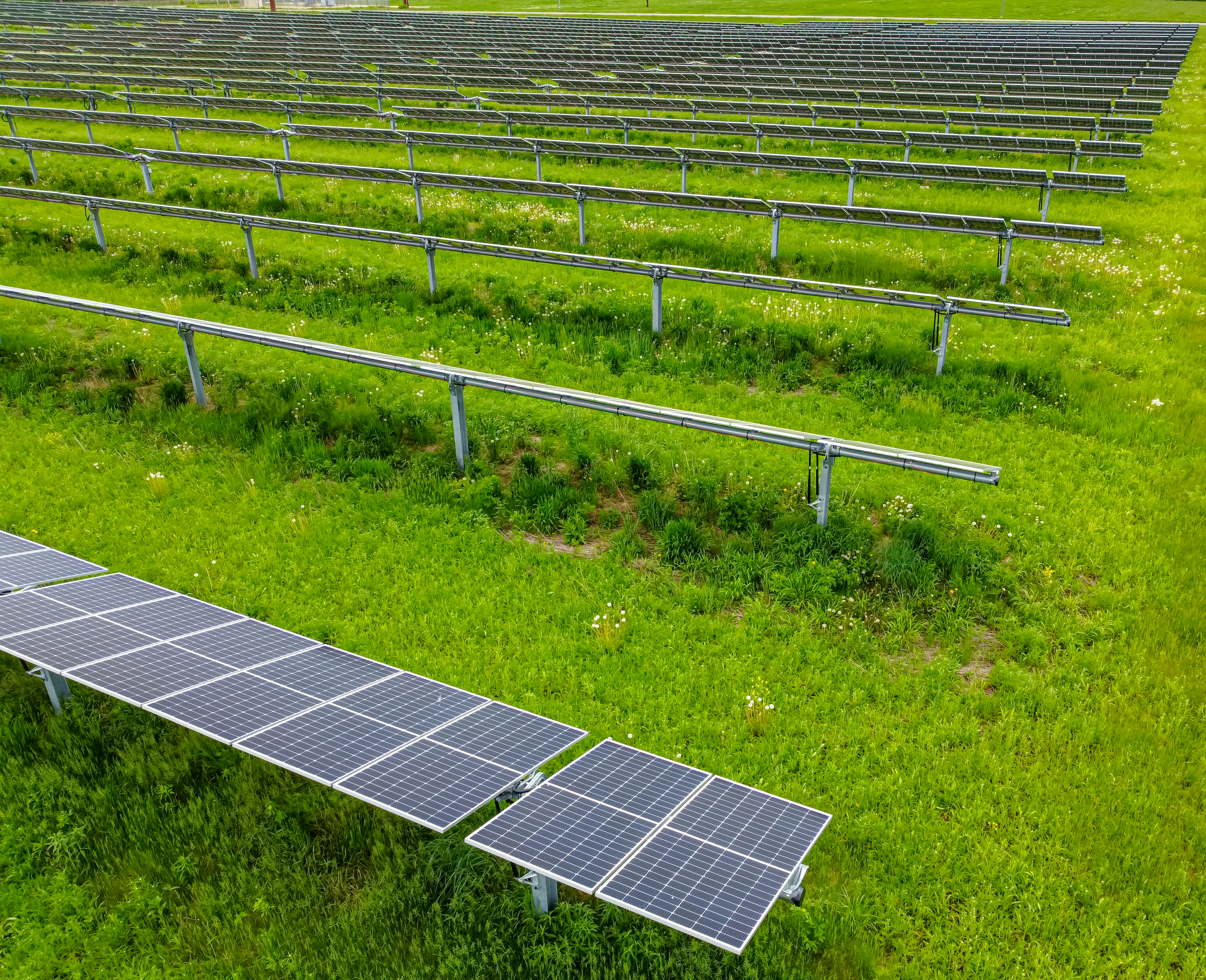
Horizontal axis solar array

Horizontal single axis tracker (HSAT)

The axis of rotation for a horizontal single-axis tracker is horizontal with respect to the ground, and the axis can be on either a north-south line or an east-west line. The posts at either end of the axis of rotation of a horizontal single-axis tracker can be shared between trackers to lower the installation cost. This type of solar tracker is most appropriate for low-latitude regions. Field layouts with horizontal single-axis trackers are very flexible. The simple geometry means that keeping all of the axes of rotation parallel to one another is all that is required for appropriately positioning the trackers with respect to one another. Appropriate spacing can maximize the ratio of energy production to cost, with this being dependent upon local terrain and shading conditions and the time-of-day value of the energy produced. Backtracking is one means of computing the disposition of panels. Horizontal trackers typically have the face of the module oriented parallel to the axis of rotation. As a module tracks, it sweeps a cylinder that is rotationally symmetric around the axis of rotation. In single-axis horizontal trackers, a long horizontal tube is supported on bearings mounted upon pylons or frames. Panels are mounted upon the tube, and the tube will rotate on its axis to track the apparent motion of the Sun through the day. The tracking aims to minimize the angle between the beam light and the normal of the panel at any instant.

Horizontal single-axis tracker with tilted modules (HTSAT)

In HSATs, the modules are mounted flat at 0°, while in HTSATs, the modules are installed at a certain tilt. It works on the same principle as HSAT, keeping the axis of tube horizontal in north-south line and rotates the solar modules from east to west throughout the day. These trackers are usually suitable in high-latitude locations but do not take as much land space as vertical single-axis trackers (VSATs). Therefore, it brings the advantages of VSATs in a horizontal tracker and minimizes the overall cost of solar project.

=== Vertical ===
Vertical single-axis tracker (VSAT)

The axis of rotation for vertical single-axis trackers is vertical with respect to the ground. These trackers rotate from east to west over the course of the day. Such trackers are more effective at high latitudes than horizontal single-axis trackers are. Field layouts must consider shading to avoid unnecessary energy losses and to optimize land use. Also, optimization for dense packing is limited due to the nature of the shading over the course of a year. Vertical single-axis trackers typically have the face of the module oriented at an angle with respect to the axis of rotation. As a module tracks, it sweeps a cone that is rotationally symmetric around the axis of rotation.

=== Tilted ===
Tilted single-axis tracker (TSAT)

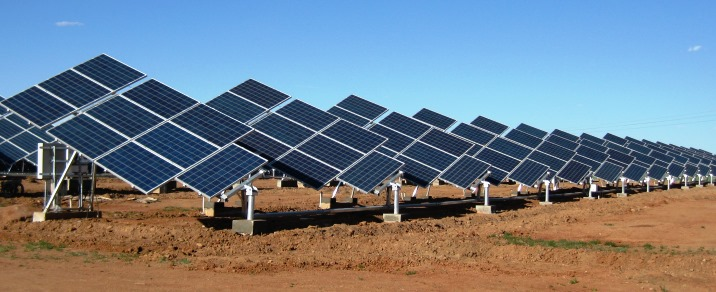
Tilted single-axis tracker in Siziwangqi, China.

All trackers with axes of rotation between horizontal and vertical are considered tilted single-axis trackers. Tracker tilt angles are often limited to reduce the wind profile and decrease the elevated end height. With backtracking, they can be packed without shading perpendicular to their axes of rotation at any density. However, the packing parallel to their axes of rotation is limited by the tilt angle and the latitude. Tilted single-axis trackers typically have the face of the module oriented parallel to the axis of rotation. As a module tracks, it sweeps a cylinder that is rotationally symmetric around the axis of rotation.

=== How various types of single-axis trackers differ in performance ===
Since a single-axis tracker seeks to minimize the incident angle of the direct sunlight at any instant, the immediate question is how the different implementations, or types, of single-axis trackers perform in capturing, or intercepting, the direct sunlight relative to each other and relative to the dual-axis tracker. A 2025 publication in the journal, Solar Energy, attempts to answer this question by developing a vector-based universal formula for the solar geometry of single-axis trackers and applying it to the top-of-atmosphere and an idealized clear-sky model at the Earth's surface for HSAT E-W (with its axis in the east-west orientation), HSAT N-S (with its axis in the north-south orientation), PSAT, VSAT and VTSAT (with a tilt angle equal to the absolute value of latitude) at all latitudes from south pole to north pole. So, which type is the best on an annual basis? The results show that it depends on the latitude. Nonetheless, the PSAT stands out as the most efficient on an annual basis in capturing the direct sunlight in the tropics and most temperate regions, only exceeded in the polar regions by the VTSAT with a tilt angle equal to the absolute value of the latitude.

== Dual-axis trackers ==
Dual-axis trackers have two degrees of freedom that act as axes of rotation. These axes are typically normal to one another. The axis that is fixed with respect to the ground can be considered a primary axis. The axis that is referenced to the primary axis can be considered a secondary axis. There are several common implementations of dual-axis trackers. They are classified by the orientation of their primary axes with respect to the ground. Two common implementations are tip-tilt dual-axis trackers (TTDAT) and azimuth-altitude dual-axis trackers (AADAT). The orientation of the module with respect to the tracker axis is important when modeling performance. Dual-axis trackers typically have modules oriented parallel to the secondary axis of rotation. Dual-axis trackers allow for optimum solar energy levels due to their ability to follow the Sun vertically and horizontally. No matter where the Sun is in the sky, dual-axis trackers are able to angle themselves to point directly at the Sun.

=== Tip-tilt ===
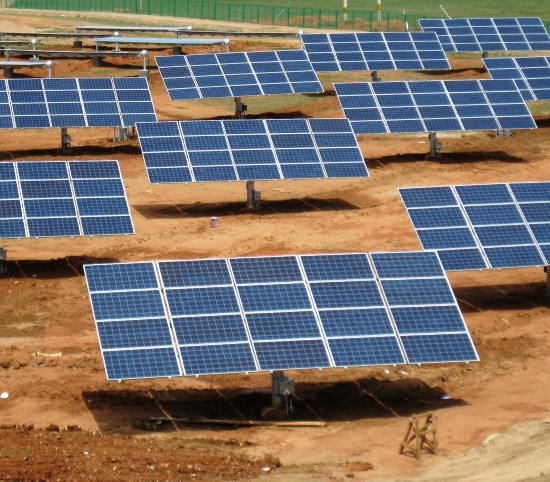
Dual-axis tracker mounted on a pole. Project in Siziwangqi

A tip-tilt dual-axis tracker (TTDAT) is so named because the panel array is mounted on the top of a pole. On top of the pole is a two-axis universal joint that provides both the effective horizontal rotation and vertical tilt of the panels and provides the dead load bearing capacity for the array. The tipping and tilting are managed by externally placed actuators. Movement around the horizon is driven by rolling the array around the top of the pole. This allows for great flexibility of the payload connection to the ground mounted equipment because there is no twisting of the cabling around the pole.

The simple geometry means that keeping the axes of rotation parallel to one another is all that is required for appropriately positioning the trackers with respect to one another. Normally the trackers would have to be positioned at fairly low density to avoid one tracker casting a shadow on others when the Sun is low in the sky. Properly spacing trackers in an array is the only way to make sure that the morning/evening solar energy can be harvested. The morning/evening solar energy harvest is what sets the 2 axis tracker apart from fixed or 1 axis tracking. One axis trackers use "Backtracking" to account for self-shading, but this doesn't need to be an issue for 2 axis tracking. If one is going to the expense of putting up a 2 axis tracker why cut corners by limiting the evening sun, space the trackers properly and enjoy a maximized harvest.

The early generation tracker axes of rotation of many tip-tilt dual-axis trackers are typically aligned either along a true north meridian or an east-west line of latitude.

The sun following solar tracker described in this paragraph has a horizontal primary axis of rotation and a secondary axis of rotation that remains orthogonal to the primary axis at all times. There is no array rotation about the vertical axis (pole mount). The net rotation about the primary and secondary axes allows the array to "roll" about the vertical axis (top of pole). Given the unique capabilities of this tip-tilt configuration and controller, a totally-automatic tracking is possible for use on portable or fixed platforms. This "sun following" tracker only responds to the location of the sun or brightest area of a clouded sky (diffuse lighting). Consequently, it can follow the sun around the Horizon as it moves throughout the Arctic 24 hour summer day. There is no need for an astronomical calculation to locate the sun's position and the orientation of the tracker axes is of no particular importance and can be placed as needed.

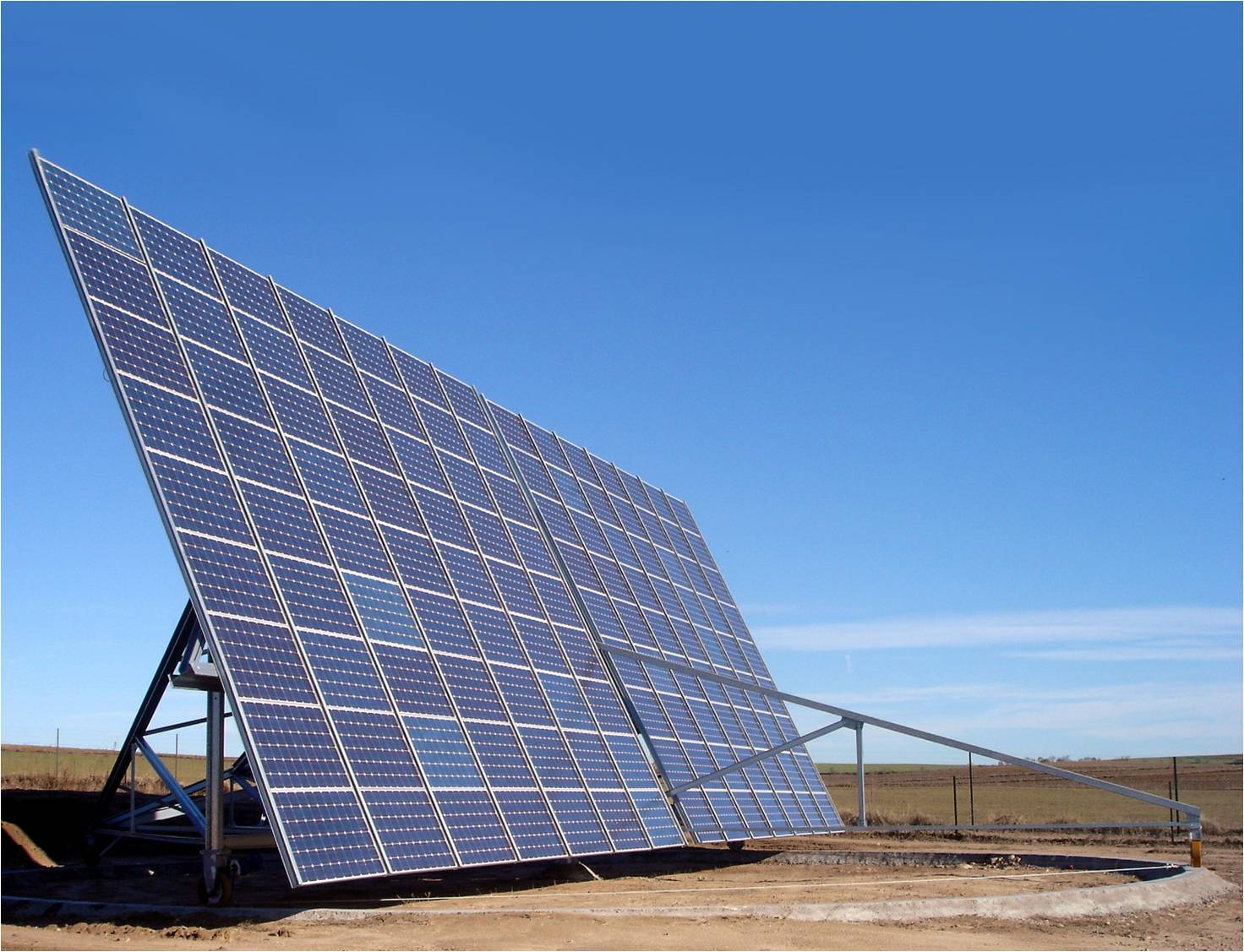
Azimuth-altitude dual-axis tracker, Toledo, Spain.

=== Azimuth-altitude ===
An azimuth-altitude (or alt-azimuth) dual axis tracker (AADAT) has its primary axis (the azimuth axis) vertical to the ground. The secondary axis, often called elevation axis, is then typically normal to the primary axis. They are similar to tip-tilt systems in operation, but they differ in the way the array is rotated for daily tracking. Instead of rotating the array around the top of the pole, AADAT systems can use a large ring mounted on the ground with the array mounted on a series of rollers. The main advantage of this arrangement is the weight of the array is distributed over a portion of the ring, as opposed to the single loading point of the pole in the TTDAT. This allows AADAT to support much larger arrays. Unlike the TTDAT, however, the AADAT system cannot be placed closer together than the diameter of the ring, which may reduce the system density, especially considering inter-tracker shading.

== Construction and (Self-)Build ==
As described later, the economic balance between the costs of panels and trackers. The steep drop in cost for solar panels in the early 2010s made it more challenging to find a sensible solution. As can be seen in the attached media files, most constructions use industrial and/or heavy materials unsuitable for small or craft workshops. Even commercial offers may have rather unsuitable solutions (a big rock) for stabilization. For a small (amateur/enthusiast) construction, the criteria that must be met include economy, stability of end product against elemental hazards, ease of handling materials, and joinery.

== Tracker type selection ==
The selection of tracker type is dependent on many factors including installation size, electric rates, government incentives, land constraints, latitude, and local weather.

Horizontal single-axis trackers are typically used for large distributed generation projects and utility scale projects. The combination of energy improvement, lower product cost, and lower installation complexity results in compelling economics in large deployments. In addition, the strong afternoon performance is particularly desirable for large grid-tied photovoltaic systems so that production will match the peak demand time. Horizontal single-axis trackers also add a substantial amount of productivity during the spring and summer seasons when the Sun is high in the sky. The inherent robustness of their supporting structure and the simplicity of the mechanism also result in high reliability which keeps maintenance costs low. Since the panels are horizontal, they can be compactly placed on the axle tube without danger of self-shading and are also readily accessible for cleaning.

A vertical-axis tracker pivots only about a vertical axle, with the panels at a fixed, adjustable, or tracked elevation angle. Such trackers with fixed or (seasonally) adjustable angles are suitable for high latitudes, where the apparent solar path is not especially high, but which leads to long days in summer, with the Sun traveling through a long arc.

Dual-axis trackers are typically used in smaller residential installations and locations with very high government feed in tariffs. Of course, that will change when the industries associated with solar realize the significance of the typical 30% loss of energy harvest at peak demand periods. Incentives for producing solar when it is needed most will drive the renewed interest in dual axis trackers.

== Multi-mirror concentrating PV ==
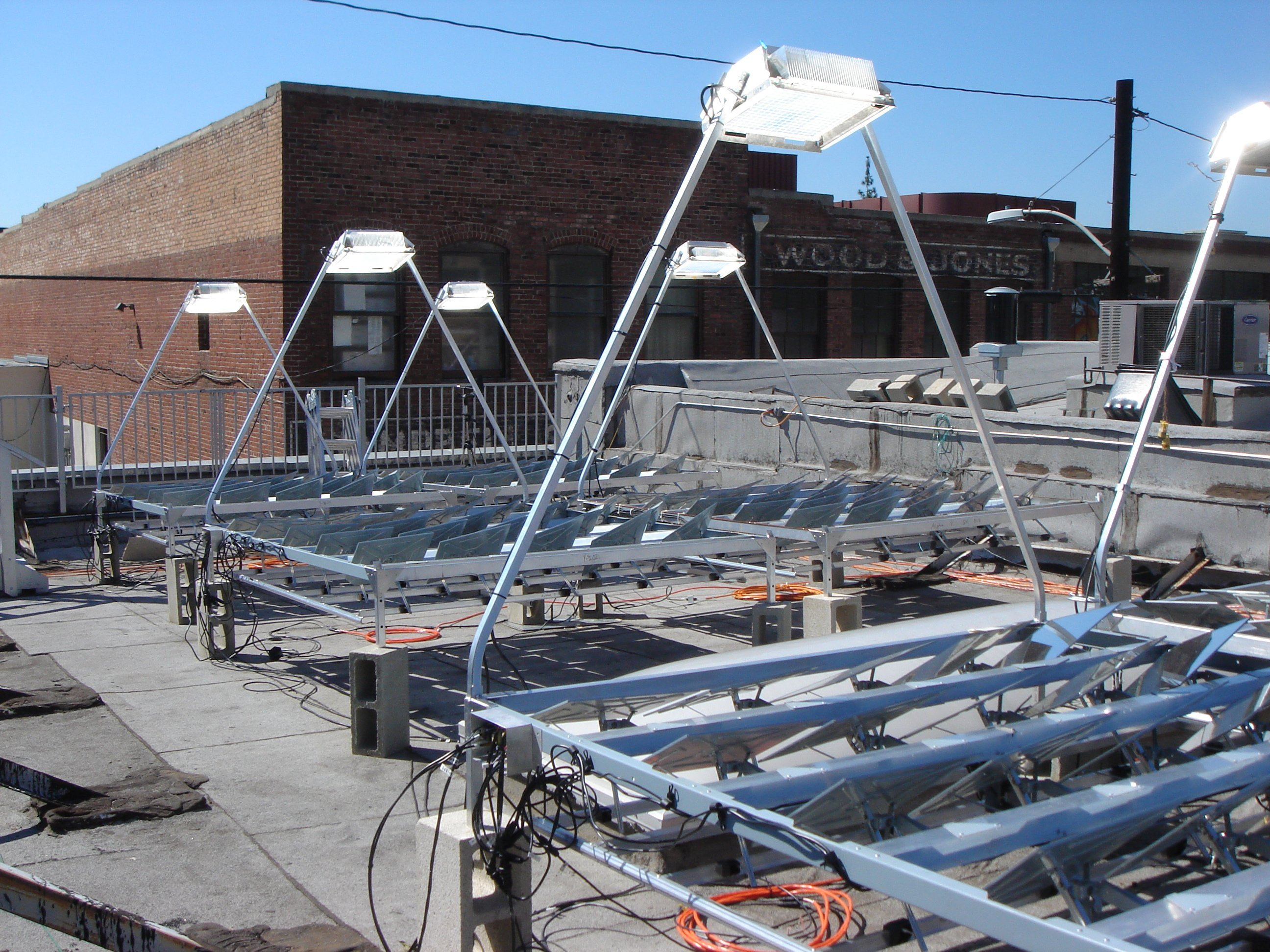
Reflective mirror concentrator units

This device uses multiple mirrors in a horizontal plane to reflect sunlight upward to a high-temperature system requiring concentrated solar power. Structural problems and expense are greatly reduced since the mirrors are not significantly exposed to wind loads. Through the employment of a patented mechanism, only two drive systems are required for each device. Because of the configuration of the device, it is especially suited for use on flat roofs and at lower latitudes. The units illustrated each produce approximately 200 peak DC watts.

A multiple-mirror reflective system combined with a central power tower was employed at the Sierra SunTower, located in Lancaster, California. This generation plant, operated by eSolar, operated from 2009 to 2014. This system, which used multiple heliostats in a north-south alignment, used pre-fabricated parts and construction as a way of decreasing startup and operating costs.

== Drive types ==
=== Active tracker ===
Active trackers use motors and gear trains to perform solar tracking. They can use microprocessors and sensors, date-and-time-based algorithms, or a combination of both to detect the position of the sun. To control and manage the movement of these massive structures, special slewing drives are designed and rigorously tested. The technologies used to direct the tracker are constantly evolving and recent developments at Google and Eternegy have included the use of wire-ropes and winches to replace some of the more costly and more fragile components.

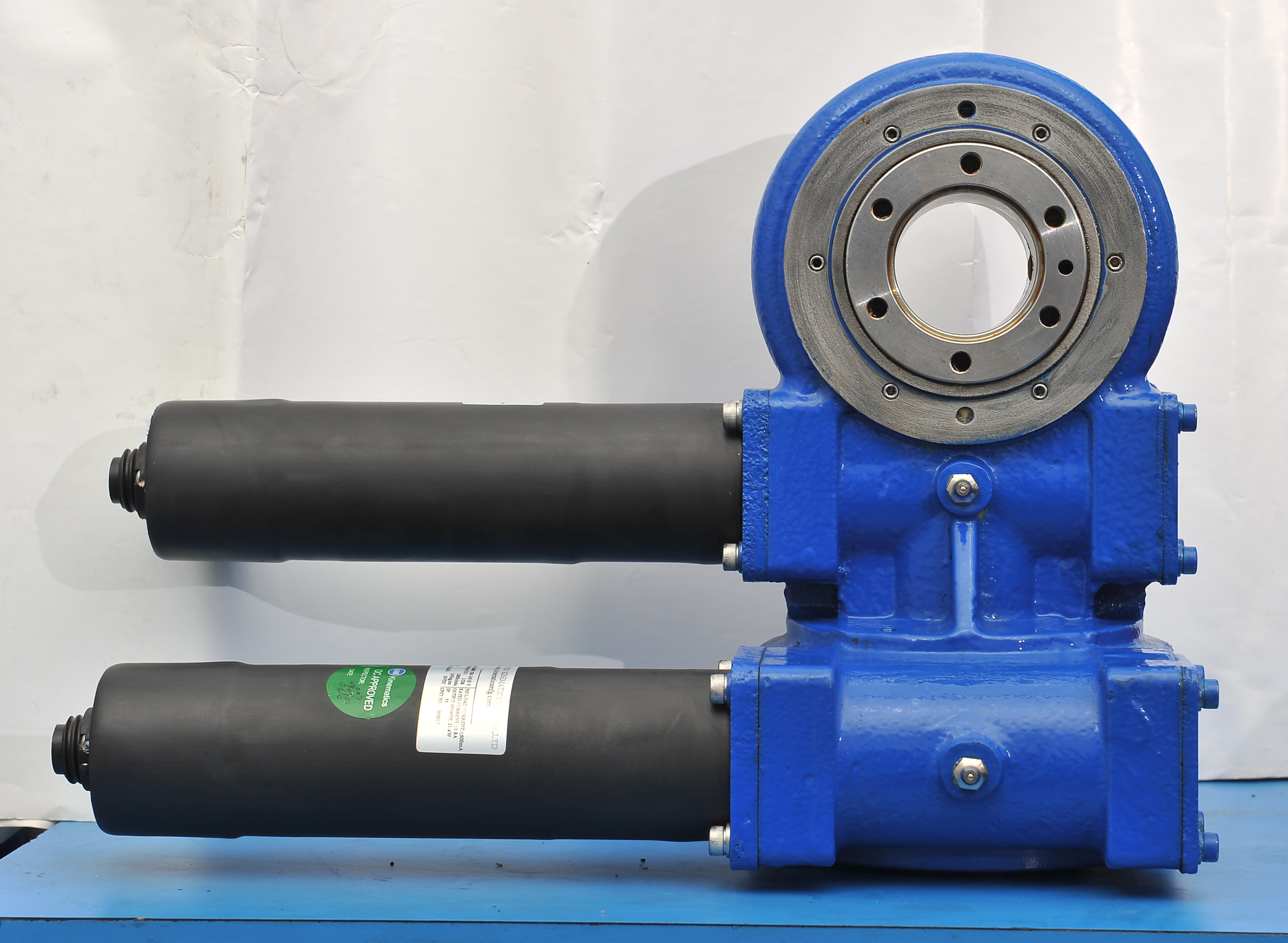
A slewing drive gearbox

Counter-rotating slewing drives sandwiching a fixed-angle support can be applied to create a "multi-axis" tracking method which eliminates rotation relative to longitudinal alignment. This method, if placed on a column or pillar, will generate more electricity than fixed PV, and its PV array will never rotate into a parking lot drive lane. It will also allow for maximum solar generation in virtually any parking lot lane/row orientation, including circular or curvilinear.

Active two-axis trackers are also used to orient heliostats – movable mirrors that reflect sunlight toward the absorber of a central power station. As each mirror in a large field will have an individual orientation, these are controlled programmatically through a central computer system, which also allows the system to be shut down when necessary.

Light-sensing trackers typically have two or more photosensors, such as photodiodes, configured differentially so that they output a null when receiving the same light flux. Mechanically, they should be omnidirectional (i.e. flat) and are aimed 90 degrees apart. This will cause the steepest part of their cosine transfer functions to balance at the steepest part, which translates into maximum sensitivity. For more information about controllers, see active daylighting.

Since the motors consume energy, one wants to use them only as necessary. So instead of a continuous motion, the heliostat is moved in discrete steps. Also, if the light is below some threshold, there would not be enough power generated to warrant reorientation. This is also true when there is not enough difference in light level from one direction to another, such as when clouds are passing overhead. Consideration must be made to keep the tracker from wasting energy during cloudy periods.

=== Passive tracker ===
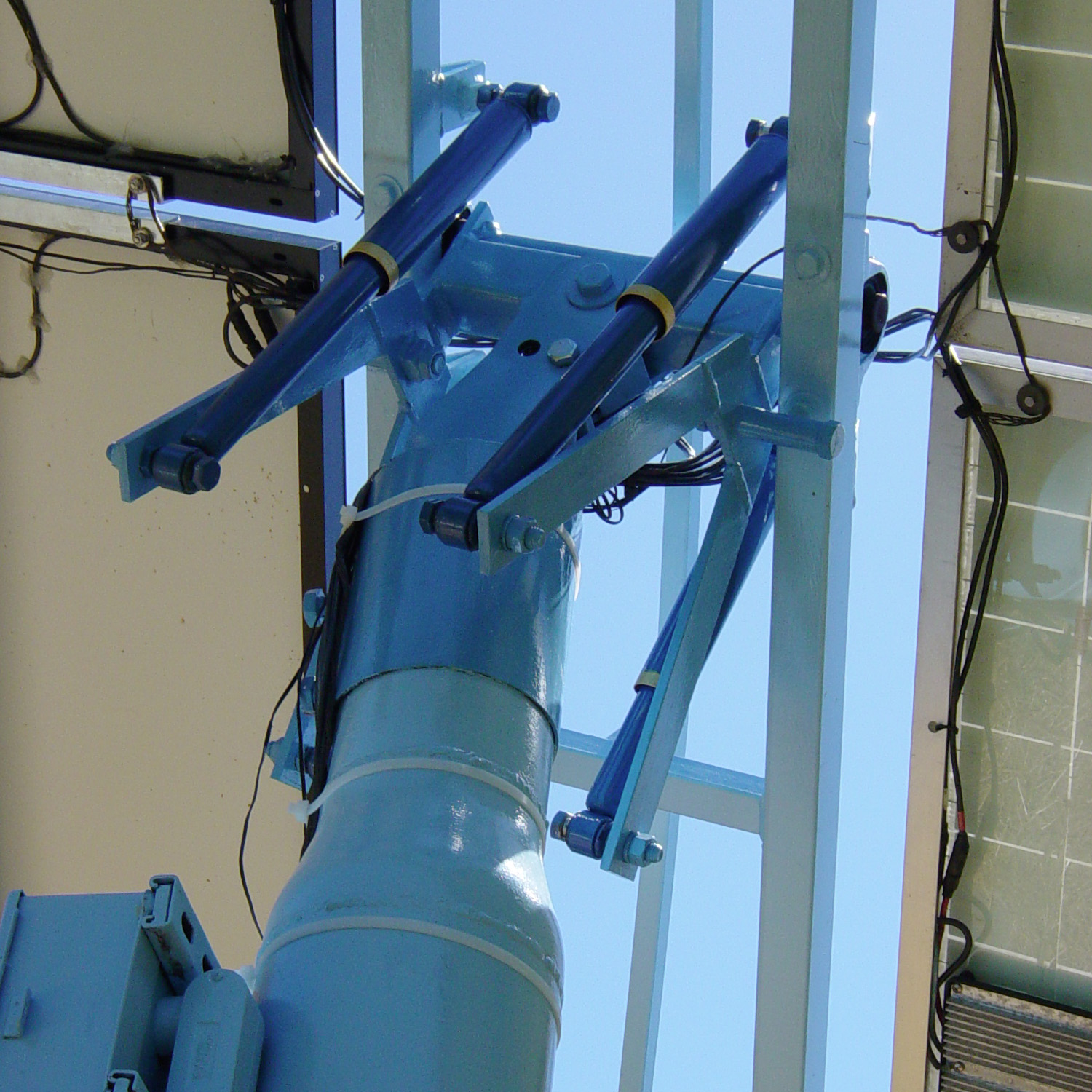
Passive tracker head in spring/summer tilt position with panels on light blue rack pivoted to morning position against stop; dark blue objects are hydraulic dampers.

The most common passive trackers use a low-boiling-point compressed gas that is driven to one side or the other (by solar heat creating gas pressure) to cause the tracker to move in response to an imbalance. As this is an imprecise orientation, it is unsuitable for certain types of concentrating photovoltaic collectors but works fine for common PV panel types. These will have viscous dampers to prevent excessive motion in response to wind gusts. Shader/reflectors are used to reflect early morning sunlight to "wake up" the panel and tilt it toward the Sun, which can take some hours, depending on shading conditions. The time to do this can be greatly reduced by adding a self-releasing tiedown that positions the panel slightly past the zenith (so that the fluid does not have to overcome gravity) and using the tiedown in the evening. (A slack-pulling spring will prevent release in windy overnight conditions.)

A newly emerging type of passive tracker for photovoltaic solar panels uses a hologram behind stripes of photovoltaic cells so that sunlight passes through the transparent part of the module and reflects on the hologram. This allows sunlight to hit the cell from behind, thereby increasing the module's efficiency. Also, the panel does not have to move since the hologram always reflects sunlight from the correct angle towards the cells.

=== Manual tracking ===
In some developing nations, drives have been replaced by operators who adjust the trackers. This has the benefits of robustness, having staff available for maintenance, and creating employment for the population in the vicinity of the site.

== Rotating buildings ==
In Freiburg im Breisgau, Germany, Rolf Disch built the Heliotrop in 1996, a residential building that is rotating with the sun and has an additional dual-axis photovoltaic sail on the roof. It produces four times the amount of energy the building consumes.

The Gemini house is a unique example of a vertical axis tracker. This cylindrical house in Austria (latitude above 45 degrees north) rotates in its entirety to track the Sun, with vertical solar panels mounted on one side of the building, rotating independently, allowing control of the natural heating from the Sun.

ReVolt House is a rotating, floating house designed by TU Delft students for the Solar Decathlon Europe competition in Madrid. The house was completed in September 2012. An opaque façade turns itself towards the Sun in summer to prevent the interior from heating up. In winter, a glass façade faces the Sun for passive solar heating of the house. Since the house is floating frictionlessly on water, rotating it does not require much energy.

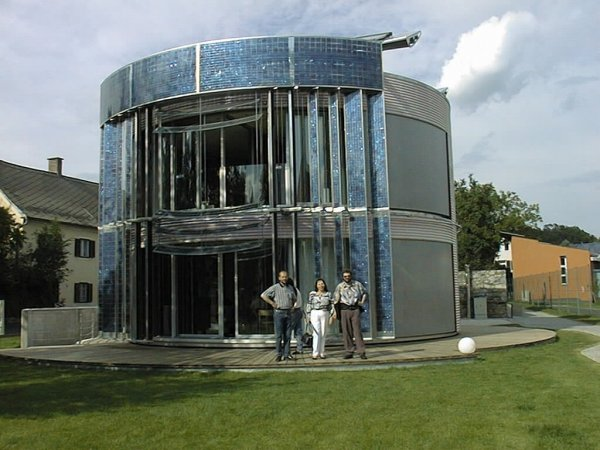
Gemini house rotates in its entirety.

== Disadvantages ==
Trackers add cost and maintenance to the system – if they add 25% to the cost, and improve the output by 25%, then the same performance can be obtained by making the system 25% larger, eliminating the additional maintenance. Tracking was very cost effective in the past when photovoltaic modules were expensive compared to today. Because they were expensive, it was important to use tracking to minimize the number of panels used in a system with a given power output. But as panels get cheaper, the cost effectiveness of tracking vs using a greater number of panels decreases. However, in off-grid installations where batteries store power for overnight use, a tracking system reduces the hours that stored energy is used, thus requiring less battery capacity. As the batteries themselves are expensive (either traditional lead-acid stationary cells or newer lithium-ion batteries), their cost needs to be included in the cost analysis.

Tracking is also not suitable for typical residential rooftop photovoltaic installations. Since tracking requires that panels tilt or otherwise move, provisions must be made to allow this. This requires that panels be offset a significant distance from the roof, which requires expensive racking and increases wind load. Also, such a setup would not make for an aesthetically pleasing install on residential rooftops. Because of this (and the high cost of such a system), tracking is not used on residential rooftop installations, and is unlikely to ever be used in such installations. This is especially true as the cost of photovoltaic modules continues to decrease, which makes increasing the number of modules for more power the more cost-effective option. Tracking can (and sometimes is) used for residential ground mount installations, where greater freedom of movement is possible.

Tracking can also cause shading problems. As the panels move during the course of the day, it is possible that, if the panels are located too close to one another, they may shade one another due to profile angle effects. As an example, if one has several panels in a row from east to west, there will be no shading during solar noon, but in the afternoon, panels could be shaded by their west neighboring panel if they are sufficiently close. This means that panels must be spaced sufficiently far to prevent shading in systems with tracking, which can reduce the available power from a given area during the peak Sun hours. This is not a big problem if there is sufficient land area to widely space the panels. But it will reduce output during certain hours of the day (i.e. around solar noon) compared to a fixed array. Optimizing this problem with math is called backtracking.

Further, single-axis tracking systems are prone to becoming unstable at relatively modest wind speeds (galloping). This is due to the torsional instability of single-axis solar tracking systems. Anti-galloping measures such as automatic stowing and external dampers must be implemented.

== See also ==
- Air mass coefficient
- Bifacial solar cells - vertical bifacial solar array
- Heliostat
- Solar energy
- Sun path
- Nextpower
