= Soiling =

Soiling may refer to:

- Soiling (solar energy), the accumulation of material on light-collecting surfaces in solar energy systems
- Fecal incontinence, a lack of control over defecation
- Encopresis, involuntary fecal incontinence in children
- Fecal leakage, a type of fecal incontinence in adults causing minor staining of undergarments

== See also ==
- Rectal discharge
- Steatorrhea
