= Photovoltaic system performance =

Renewable energy concept

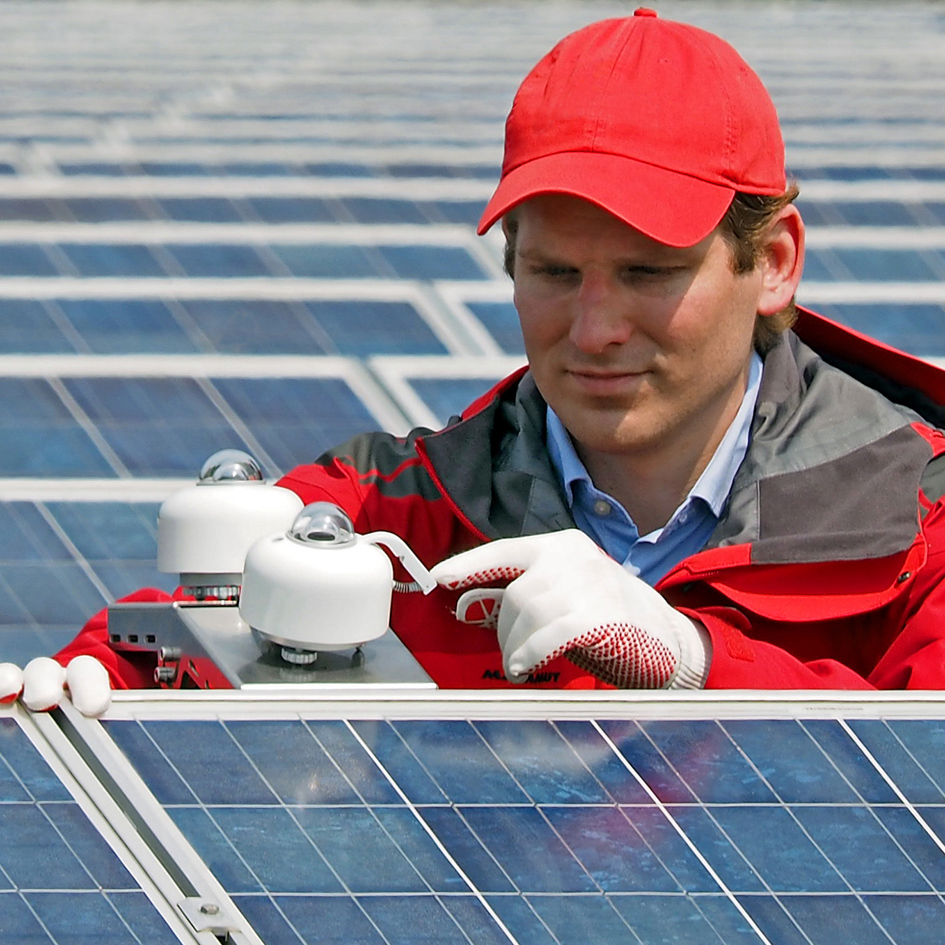
The SR30 pyranometer is an example of an PV monitoring sensor, which can be used in two orientations (horizontal and in plane of array) for measuring irradiance.

Photovoltaic system performance is a function of the climatic conditions, the equipment used and the system configuration. PV performance can be measured as the ratio of actual solar PV system output vs expected values, the measurement being essential for proper solar PV facility's operation and maintenance. The primary energy input is the global light irradiance in the plane of the solar arrays, and this in turn is a combination of the direct and the diffuse radiation.

The performance is measured by PV monitoring systems, which include a data logging device and often also a weather measurement device (on-site device or an independent weather data source). Photovoltaic performance monitoring systems serve several purposes - they are used to track trends in a single photovoltaic (PV) system, to identify faults in or damage to solar panels and inverters, to compare the performance of a system to design specifications or to compare PV systems at different locations. This range of applications requires various sensors and monitoring systems, adapted to the intended purpose. Specifically, there is a need for both electronic monitoring sensors and independent weather sensing (irradiance, temperature and more) in order to normalize PV facility output expectations. Irradiance sensing is very important for the PV industry and can be classified into two main categories - on-site pyranometers and satellite remote sensing; when onsite pyranometers are not available, regional weather stations are also sometimes utilized, but at lower quality of data; the Industrial IoT-powered sensorless measurement approach has recently evolved as the third option.

Sensors and photovoltaic monitoring systems are standardized in IEC 61724-1 and classified into three levels of accuracy, denoted by the letters "A", "B" or "C", or by the labels "High accuracy", "Medium accuracy" and "Basic accuracy". A parameter called the 'performance ratio' has been developed to evaluate the total value of PV system losses.

== Principles ==
Photovoltaic system performance is generally dependent on incident irradiance in the plane of the solar panels, the temperature of the solar cells, and the spectrum of the incident light. Furthermore, it is dependent upon the inverter, which typically sets the operating voltage of the system. The voltage and current output of the system changes as lighting, temperature and load conditions change, so there is no specific voltage, current, or wattage at which the system always operates. Hence, system performance varies depending on its architecture (direction and tilt of modules), geographic location and the time of day, weather conditions (amount of solar insolation, cloud cover, temperature), and local disturbances such as shading, soiling, state of charge, and system component availability.

== Performance by system type ==
=== Solar PV parks ===
Solar parks of industrial and utility scale may reach high performance figures. In modern solar parks the performance ratio should typically be in excess of 80%. Many solar PV parks utilize advanced performance monitoring solutions, which are supplied by a variety of technology providers.

=== Distributed solar PV ===
In rooftop solar systems it typically takes a longer time to identify a malfunction and send a technician, due to lower availability of sufficient photovoltaic system performance monitoring tools and higher costs of human labor. As a result, rooftop solar PV systems typically suffer from lower quality of operation & maintenance and essentially lower levels of system availability and energy output.

=== Off-grid solar PV ===
Most off-grid solar PV facilities lack any performance monitoring tools, due to a number of reasons - including monitoring equipment costs, cloud connection availability and O&M availability.

== Performance measurement and monitoring ==
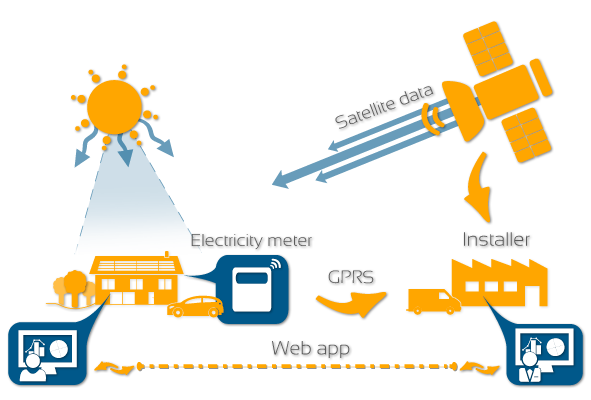
Rbee Solar, PV monitoring with solar irradiance measurement

A number of technical solutions exist to provide performance measurement and monitoring for solar photovoltaic installations, differing according to data quality, compatibility with irradiance sensors as well as pricing.

=== Weather data acquisition ===
Weather data acquisition is generally relying on physical weather sensors and remote sensing with satellites.

=== Energy generation data availability and quality ===
An essential part of PV system performance evaluation is the availability and the quality of energy generation data. Access to the Internet has allowed a further improvement in energy monitoring and communication.

Typically, PV plant data is transmitted via a data logger to a central monitoring portal. Data transmission is dependent on the local cloud connectivity, thus being highly available in OECD countries, but more limited in developed countries. According to Samuel Zhang, vice president of Huawei Smart PV, over 90% of global PV plants will be fully digitalized by 2025.

=== Performance monitoring ===
In general, monitoring solutions can be classified to inverter manufacturer-provided logger and monitoring software solutions, independent data-logger solutions with custom software and finally agnostic monitoring software-only solutions compatible with different inverters and data-loggers.

==== Monitoring solutions by inverter manufacturers ====
Dedicated performance monitoring systems are available from a number of vendors. For solar PV systems that use microinverters (panel-level DC to AC conversion), module power data is automatically provided. Some systems allow setting performance alerts that trigger phone/email/text warnings when limits are reached. These solutions provide data for the system owner and/or the installer. Installers are able to remotely monitor multiple installations, and see at-a-glance the status of their entire installed base. All the major inverter manufacturers provide a data acquisition unit - whether a data logger or a direct means of communication with the portal.

These solutions have the advantage of providing of a maximum information from the inverter and of supplying it on a local display or transmitting it on the internet, in particular alerts from the inverter itself (temperature overload, loss of connection with a network, etc.).

Some of those monitoring solutions are:

- Fronius accessible via Solar.web portal;
- SMA's Webbox/Inverter Manager/Cluster-Controller loggers accessible via Sunnyportal and EnnexOS portals;
- SolarEdge accessible via SolarEdge Monitoring and MySolarEdge (only application) portals;
- Sungrow accessible via the iSolarCloud portal;

==== Independent data logging solutions connected to inverters ====
Generic data logging solutions connected to inverters make it possible to overcome the major drawback of inverter-specific manufacturer solutions - being compatible with several different manufacturers. These data acquisition units connect to the serial links of the inverters, complying with each manufacturer’s protocol. Generic data logging solutions are generally more affordable than inverter manufacturer solutions and allow aggregation of solar PV system fleets of varying inverter manufacturers.

Some of those monitoring solutions are:

- AlsoEnergy loggers accessible via the PowerTrack portal;
- Solar-Log loggers accessible via the WEB Enerest 4 portal;
- Meteocontrol loggers accessible via the VCOM Cloud portal;
- Solar Analytics' "Smart Solar logger"s accessible via the Solar Analytics portal;

==== Independent monitoring solutions ====
The last category is the most recent segment in the solar photovoltaic monitoring domain. Those are software based aggregation portals, able to aggregate information from both inverter-specific portals and data loggers as well as independent data loggers. Such solutions become more widespread as inverter-specific communication to the cloud is done more and more without data loggers, but rather as direct data connections.

- Omnidian residential solar performance insurance partner Omnidian;
- Solytic generic solar monitoring Solytic portal;
- Sunreport device-agnostic cloud solar monitoring Sunreport platform;

== Weather data sources ==
=== On-site irradiance sensors ===
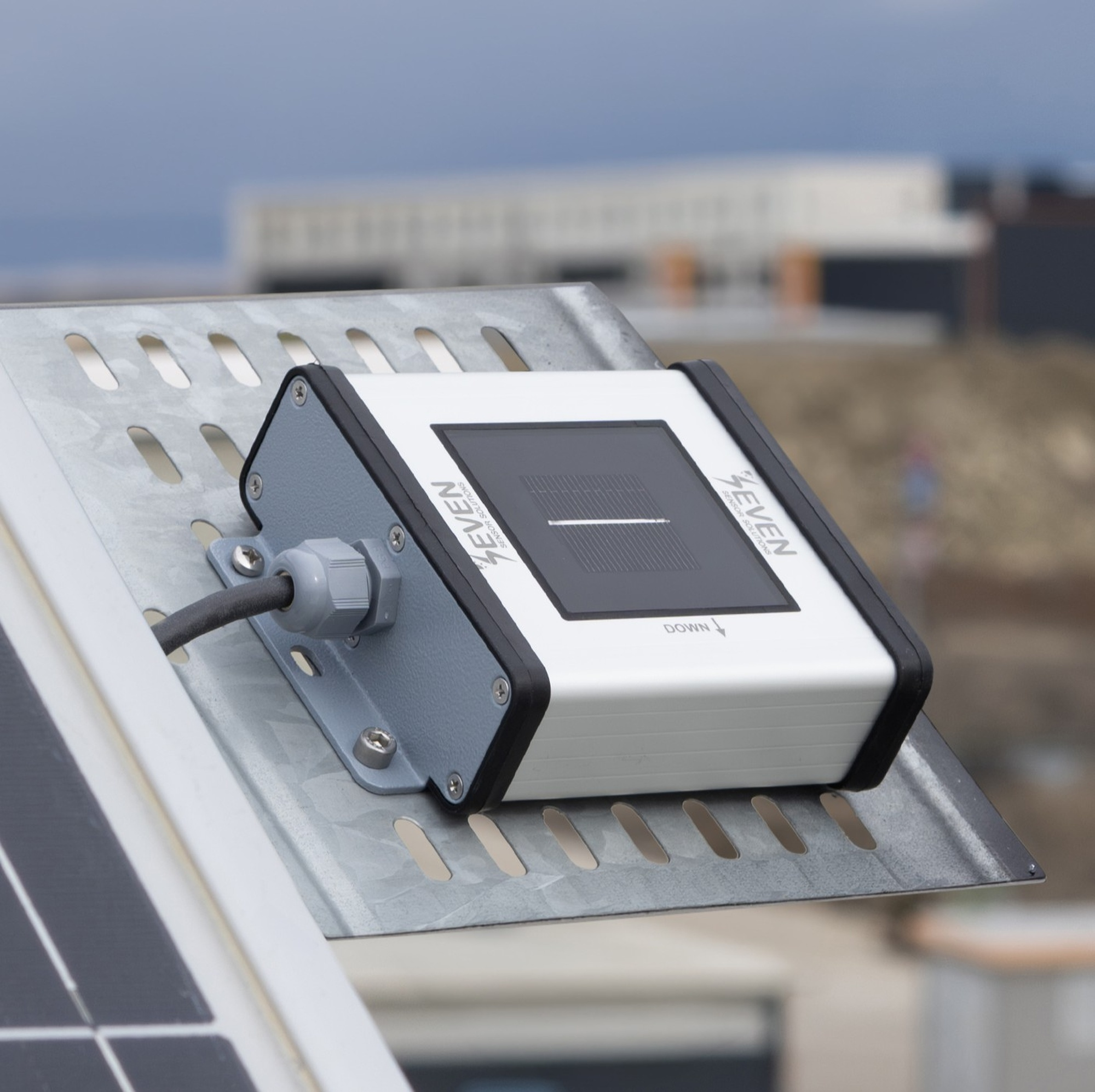
A PV reference cell used for plane-of-array irradiance measurement.

On-site irradiance measurements are an important part of PV performance monitoring systems. Irradiance can be measured in the same orientation as the PV panels, so-called plane of array (POA) measurements, or horizontally, so-called global horizontal irradiance (GHI) measurements. Typical sensors used for such irradiance measurements include thermopile pyranometers, PV reference devices and photodiode sensors. To conform to a specific accuracy class, each sensor type must meet a certain set of specifications. These specifications are listed in the table below.

Table 5 - Sensor choices and requirements for in-plane and global irradiance cited from IEC 61724-1
Sensor type	Class A High accuracy	Class B Medium accuracy	Class C Basic accuracy
Thermopile pyranometer	Secondary standard per ISO 9060 or High quality per WMO Guide (Uncertainty ≤ 3% for hourly totals)	First class per ISO 9060 or Good quality per WMO Guide (Uncertainty ≤ 8% for hourly totals)	Any
PV reference device	Uncertainty ≤ 3% from 100 W/m^{2} to 1500 W/m^{2}	Uncertainty ≤ 8% from 100 W/m^{2} to 1500 W/m^{2}	Any
Photodiode sensors	Not applicable	Not applicable	Any

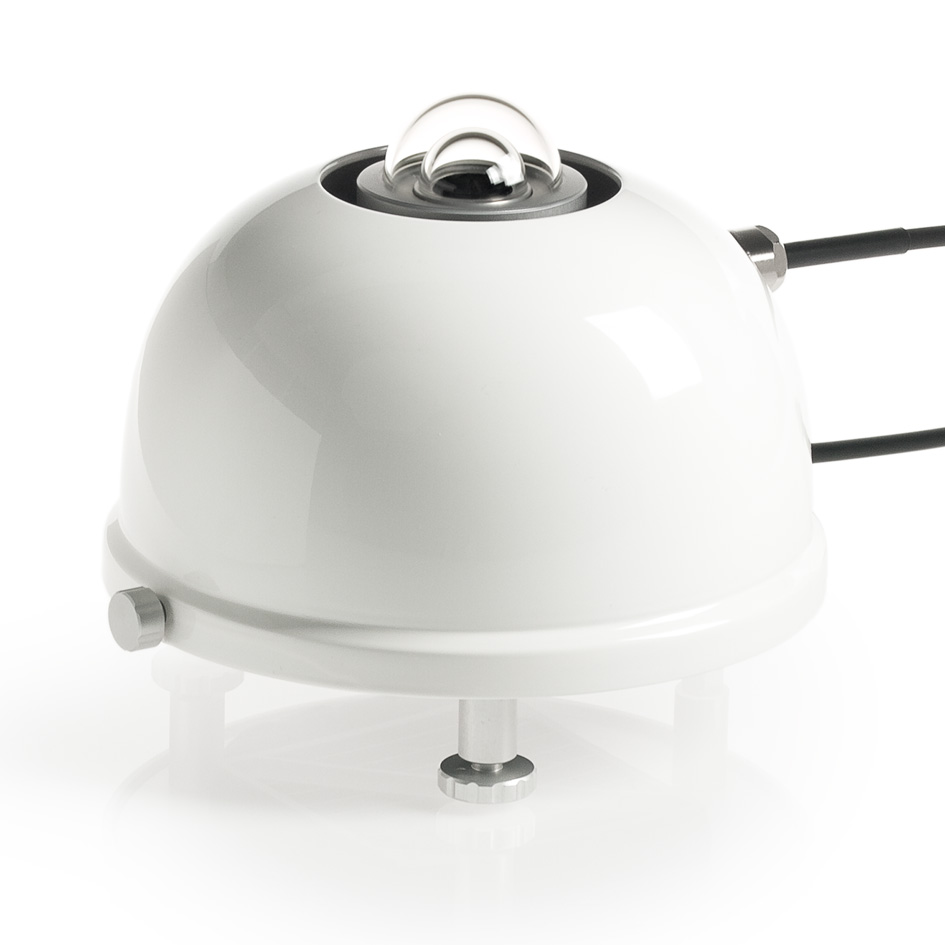
The VU01 pyranometer ventilation unit with SR20, with heater and ventilation, is an A-class compliant pyranometer according to the IEC 61727-1.

If an irradiance sensor is placed in POA, it must be placed at the same tilt angle as the PV module, either by attaching it to the module itself or with an extra platform or arm at the same tilt level. Checking if the sensor is properly aligned can be done with portable tilt sensors or with an integrated tilt sensor.

==== Sensor maintenance ====
The standard also specifies a required maintenance schedule per accuracy class. Class C sensors require maintenance per manufacturer's requirement. Class B sensors need to be re-calibrated every 2 years and require a heater to prevent precipitation or condensation. Class A sensors need to be re-calibrated once per year, require cleaning once per week, require a heater and require ventilation (for thermopile pyranometers).

=== Satellite remote sensing of irradiance ===
PV performance can also be estimated by satellite remote sensing. These measurements are indirect because the satellites measure the solar radiance reflected off the earth surface. In addition, the radiance is filtered by the spectral absorption of Earth's atmosphere. This method is typically used in non-instrumented class B and class C monitoring systems to avoid costs and maintenance of on-site sensors. If the satellite-derived data is not corrected for local conditions, an error in radiance up to 10% is possible.

== Equipment and performance standards ==
Sensors and monitoring systems are standardized in IEC 61724-1 and classified into three levels of accuracy, denoted by the letters "A", "B" or "C", or by the labels "High accuracy", "Medium accuracy" and "Basic accuracy".

In California, solar PV performance monitoring has been regulated by the State government. As of 2017, the governmental agency California Solar Initiative (CSI) provided a Performance Monitoring & Reporting Service certificate to eligible companies active in the solar segment and acting in line with CSI requirements.

A parameter called the 'performance ratio' has been developed to evaluate the total value of PV system losses. The performance ratio gives a measure of the output AC power delivered as a proportion of the total DC power which the solar modules should be able to deliver under the ambient climatic conditions.

== See also ==
- Photovoltaics
- Pyranometer
- Remote sensing
- Atmosphere of Earth
- Absorption (electromagnetic radiation)
