= Solar panel =

Assembly of photovoltaic cells used to generate electricity

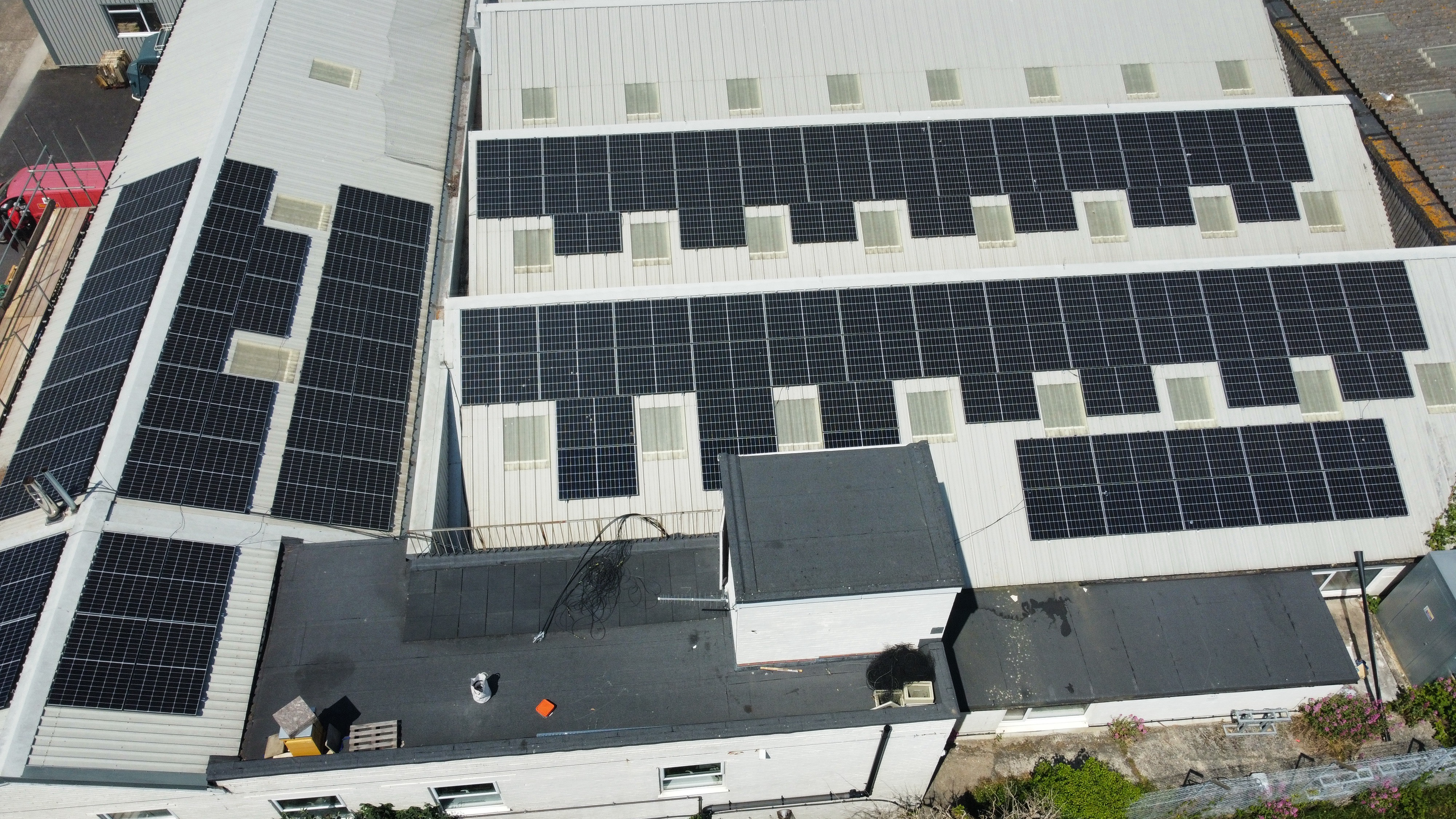
Greencap Energy solar array mounted on brewery in Worthing, England

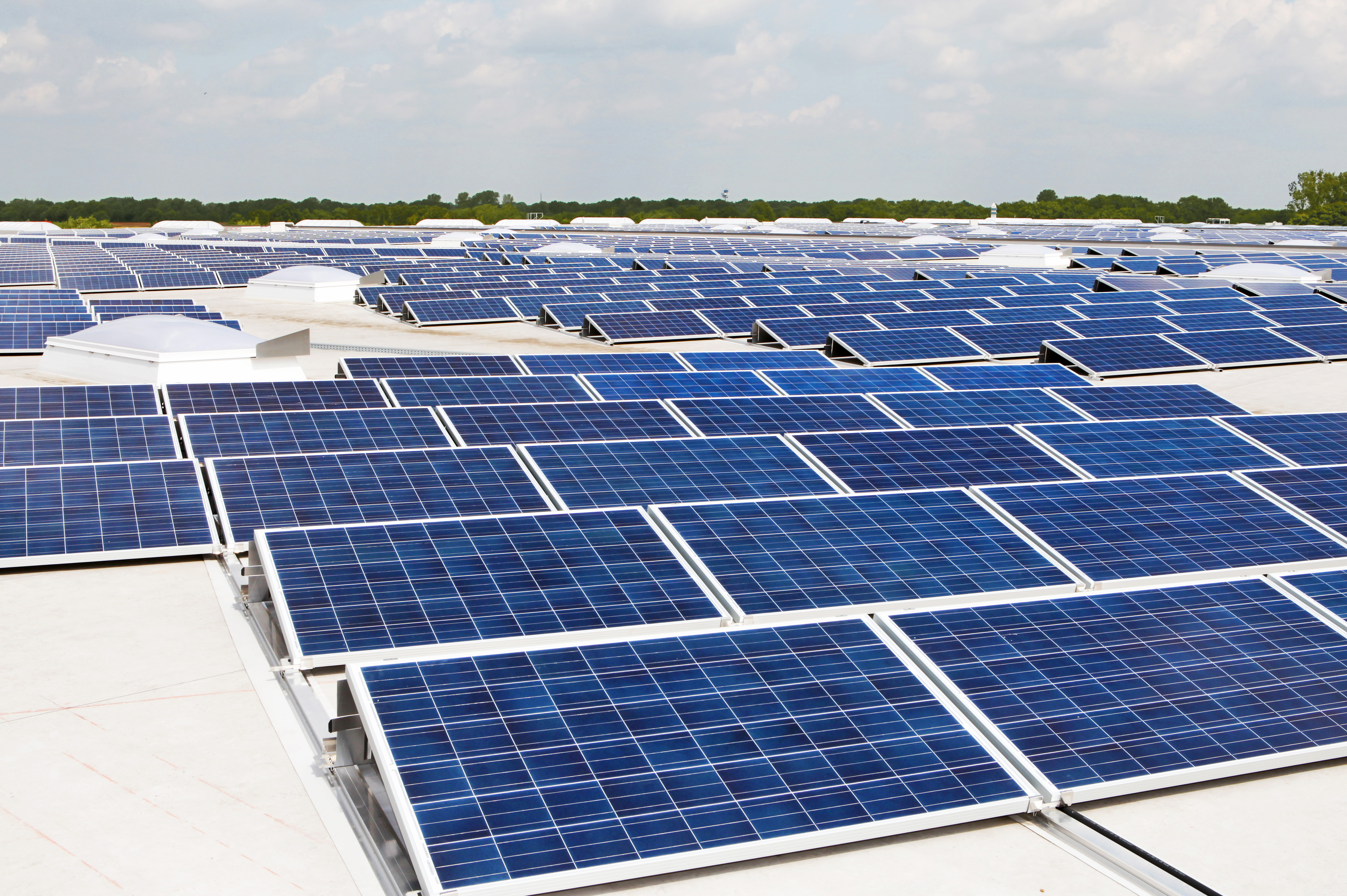
Solar array mounted on a rooftop

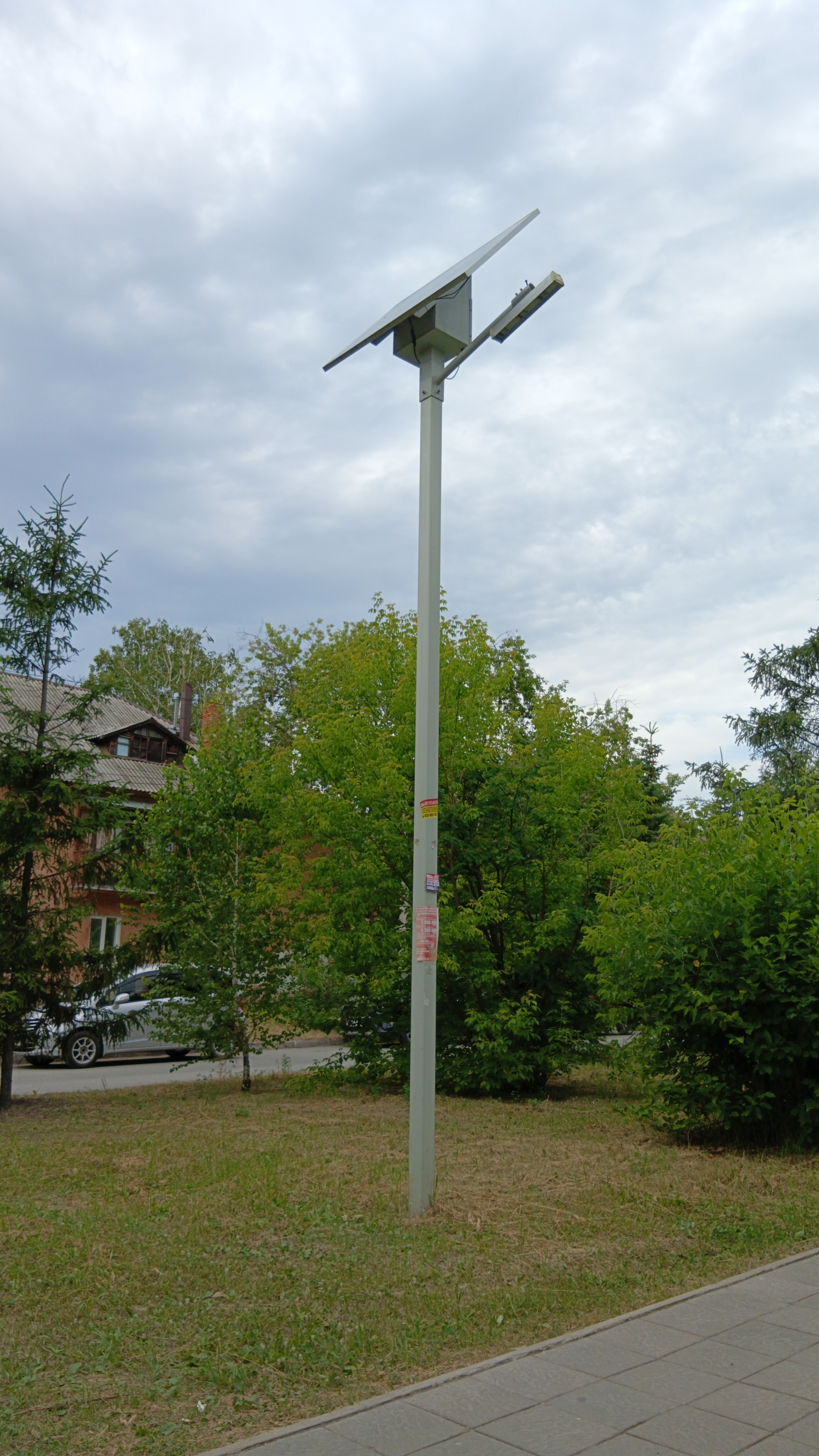
A single solar panel that powers a light fixture in Omsk, Russia

A solar panel is a device that converts sunlight into electricity by using multiple solar modules that consist of photovoltaic (PV) cells. PV cells are made of materials that produce excited electrons when exposed to light. These electrons flow through a circuit and produce direct current electricity, which can be used to power various devices or be stored in batteries.

Solar panels can be known as solar cell panels, or solar electric panels.

Solar panels are usually arranged in groups called arrays or systems. A photovoltaic system consists of one or more solar panels, an inverter that converts direct current electricity to alternating current where it is necessary, and sometimes other components such as charge controllers, meters, or solar trackers to maximize direct sunlight. Most panels are in solar farms or rooftop solar panels, which supply the electricity grid.

Solar panels use a renewable and clean source of energy, and reduce greenhouse gas emissions compared to hydrocarbon-sourced energy. However, they depend on the availability and intensity of sunlight, require cleaning, and have high initial costs. Solar panels are widely used for residential, commercial, and industrial purposes, as well as in space, often together with batteries.

== History ==
=== Early developments ===
In 1839, the ability of some materials to create an electrical charge from light exposure was first observed by the French physicist Edmond Becquerel. Though these initial solar cells were too inefficient for even simple electric devices, they were used as an instrument to measure light.

The observation by Becquerel was not replicated again until 1873, when the English electrical engineer Willoughby Smith discovered that the charge could be caused by light hitting selenium. After this discovery, William Grylls Adams and Richard Evans Day published "The action of light on selenium" in 1876, describing the experiment they used to replicate Smith's results.

In 1881, the American inventor Charles Fritts created the first commercial solar cell, which was reported by Fritts as "continuous, constant and of considerable force not only by exposure to sunlight but also to dim, diffused daylight". However, these solar cells were still very inefficient for practical power production, especially compared to coal-fired power plants.

In 1939, Russell Ohl created the solar cell design that is used in many modern solar panels. He patented his design in 1941. In 1954, this design was first used by Bell Labs to create the first commercially viable silicon solar cell.

=== Exponential growth ===
Price per watt history for conventional (c-Si) solar cells since 1977

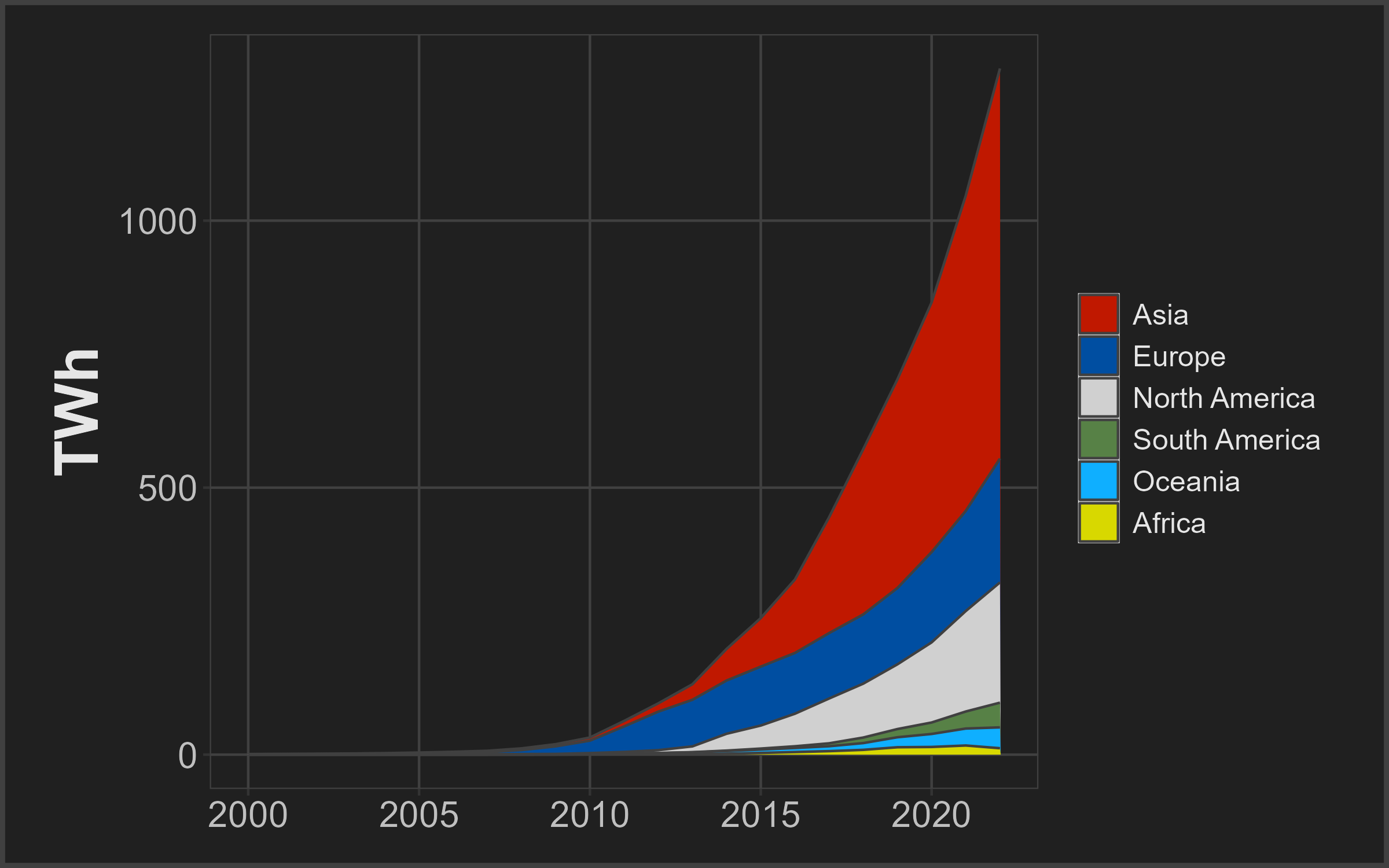
Yearly solar generation by continent

Falling costs have been the biggest factor in the recent exponential growth of Solar energy. Since 2010, the cost of solar photovoltaic electricity has fallen 85%. Solar panel installers saw significant growth between 2008 and 2013. Due to that growth, many solar-roof installations were not "ideal" to work with - they had to find solutions to shaded roofs and orientation difficulties. This challenge was initially addressed by the re-popularization of micro-inverters and later the invention of power optimizers.

Solar panel manufacturers partnered with micro-inverter companies to create alternating current modules and power optimizer companies partnered with module manufacturers to create smart modules. In 2013 many solar panel manufacturers announced and began shipping their smart module solutions.

Between 1992 and 2023, the worldwide usage of photovoltaics (PV) increased exponentially. During this period, it evolved from a niche market of small-scale applications to a mainstream electricity source. From 2016 to 2022, PV has seen an annual capacity and production growth rate of around 26%, doubling approximately every three years. By the end of 2022, the global cumulative installed PV capacity reached about 1,185 gigawatts (GW), supplying over 6% of global electricity demand, up from about 3% in 2019.

The decreasing cost of solar panels is driving an increase in solar energy use in the Global South. Many countries in the Global South rely on expensive fossil fuel imports. Many homes and businesses are switching to solar energy to save money

== Theory and construction ==
From a solar cell to a PV system

Photovoltaic modules consist of a large number of solar cells and use light energy from the Sun to generate electricity through the photovoltaic effect. Most modules use wafer-based crystalline silicon cells or thin-film cells. The structural (load carrying) member of a module can be either the top layer or the back layer. Cells must be protected from mechanical damage and moisture. The cells and modules are usually connected electrically in series, one to another to increase the desired voltage output, and then in parallel to increase current output to create the solar panel. Most panels are rigid, but semi-flexible ones based on thin-film cells are also available. The power (in watts) of the solar panel is the voltage (in volts) multiplied by the current (in amperes), and depends both on the amount of light and on the electrical load connected to the panel. The manufacturing specifications on solar panels are obtained under standard conditions, which are usually not the true operating conditions the solar panels are exposed to on the installation site. A PV junction box is attached to the back of the solar panel and functions as its output interface. External connections for most photovoltaic modules use MC4 connectors to facilitate easy weatherproof connections to the rest of the system. A USB power interface can also be used.

Solar panels also use metal frames consisting of racking components, brackets, reflector shapes, and troughs to better support the panel structure.

=== Cell connection techniques ===
Solar cells need to be connected together by electrodes to form a module, with front electrodes blocking the solar cell front optical surface area slightly. To improve solar cell efficiency manufacturers maximize frontal surface area available for sunlight and improve sunlight absorption using chronologically adopted, varying rear electrode solar cell connection techniques:

- Aluminum back surface field (Al-BSF), a vintage technology, uses full aluminum rear contact face
- Passivated emitter rear contact (PERC) uses a reduced aluminum rear contact face and adds a polymer film where aluminum was removed to capture light
- Tunnel oxide passivated contact (TOPCon) uses increasingly smaller silver bus bars and adds an oxidation layer with a rough surface to the PERC polymer film to capture more light
- Interdigitated back contact (IBC) places contacts fully on the back allowing full frontal light exposure to capture even more light
- Extended back contact (XBC) uses a combination of the above technologies

Tandem solar cells use one of the above connection techniques and a combination of cell chemistries to form a solar cell.

=== Arrays of solar panels ===
A single solar panel can produce only a limited amount of power; most installations contain multiple panels adding their voltages or currents. A photovoltaic system typically includes an array of photovoltaic modules, an inverter, a battery pack for energy storage, a charge controller, interconnection wiring, circuit breakers, fuses, disconnect switches, voltage meters, and optionally a solar tracking mechanism. Equipment is carefully selected to optimize energy output and storage, reduce power transmission losses, and many times convert from direct current to alternating current.

=== Smart solar panels ===
Smart module

Smart solar panels have power electronics embedded in the panel and are different from traditional solar panels with power electronics attached to the frame or connected to the photovoltaic circuit through a connector. Solar power electronics can be used for:

- Maximum power point tracking power optimizers, a technology developed to maximize the power harvest from solar photovoltaic systems by compensating for shading effects, wherein a shadow falling on a section of a module causes the electrical output of one or more strings of cells in the module to fall to near zero, but not having the output of the entire module fall to zero.
- Solar performance monitors for data collection
- Fault detection for enhanced safety

=== Technology ===
Market-share of PV technologies since 1980

Most solar modules are currently produced from crystalline silicon (c-Si) solar cells made of polycrystalline or monocrystalline silicon. In 2021, crystalline silicon accounted for 95% of worldwide PV production, while the rest of the overall market is made up of thin-film technologies using cadmium telluride (CdTe), copper indium gallium selenide and amorphous silicon (a-Si).

Bifacial cells produce energy on both sides which increases the total output of the module, this boost depends on the reflectivity of the surroundings and benefits from raised constructions since more light can reach the rear side. The gain is situational, the rear side benefits more from high-albedo surroundings such as snow, raised constructions and overcast weather but the gains might be minimal when the panels are installed directly on a surface with little clearance making it not cost-effective in those cases. The price of bifacial cells has dropped enough to be close to monofacial technologies, because of this as of 2024, bifacial panels are the leading choice for utility-scale PV installations.

Emerging, third-generation solar technologies use advanced thin-film cells. They produce a relatively high-efficiency conversion for a lower cost compared with other solar technologies. Also, high-cost, high-efficiency, and close-packed rectangular multi-junction solar cells are usually used in solar panels on spacecraft, as they offer the highest ratio of generated power per kilogram lifted into space. Multi-junction cells are compound semiconductors and made of gallium arsenide and other semiconductor materials. Another emerging PV technology using multi-junction cells is concentrator photovoltaics.

==== Thin film ====
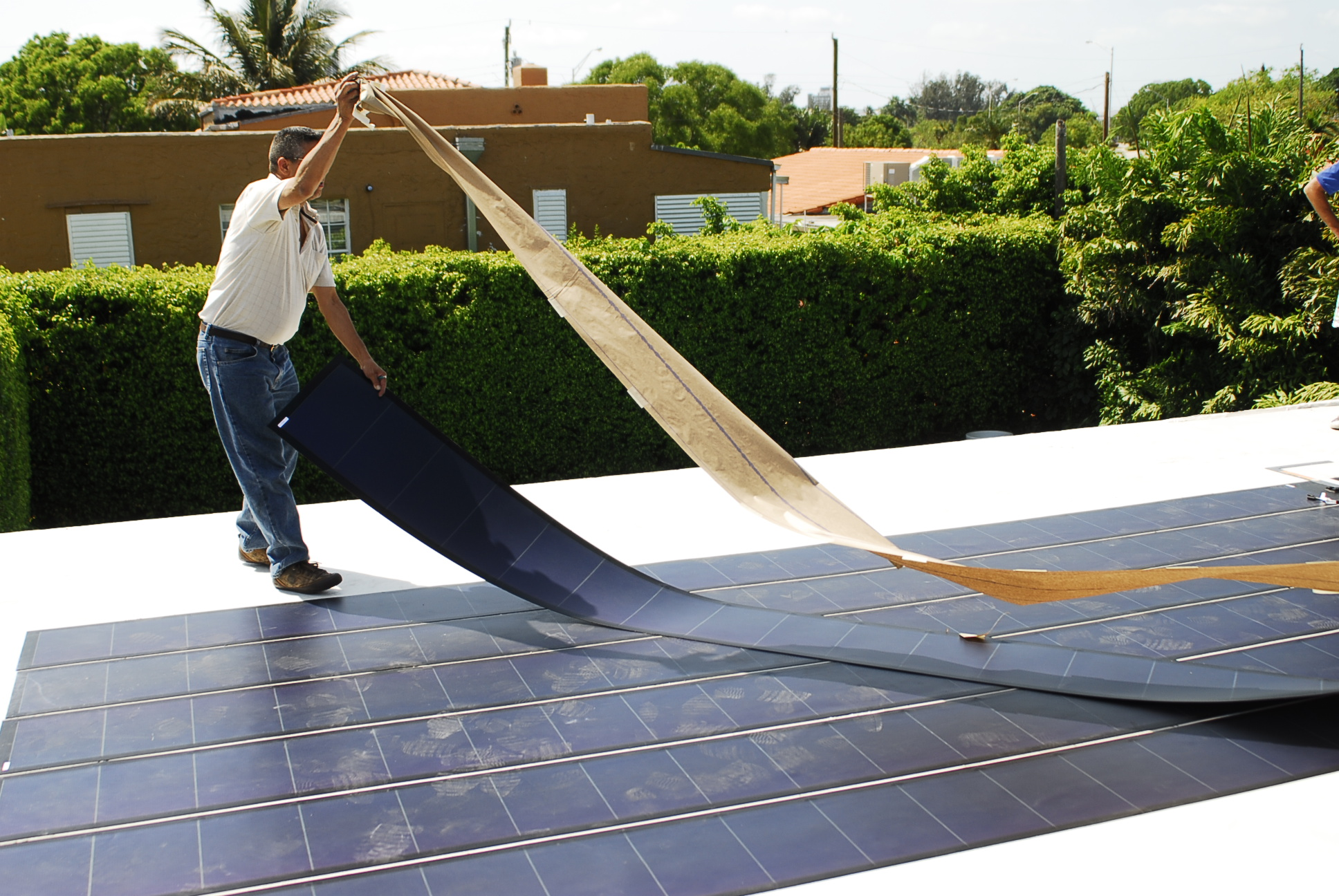
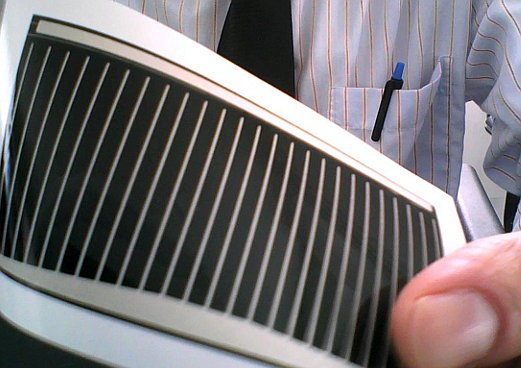
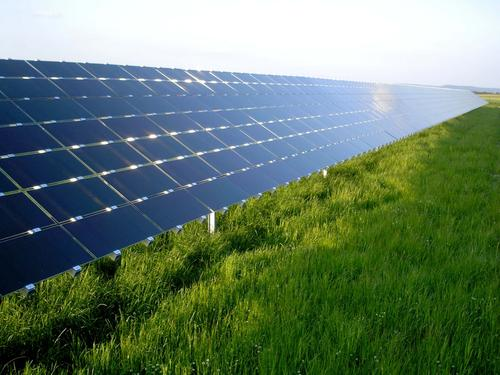
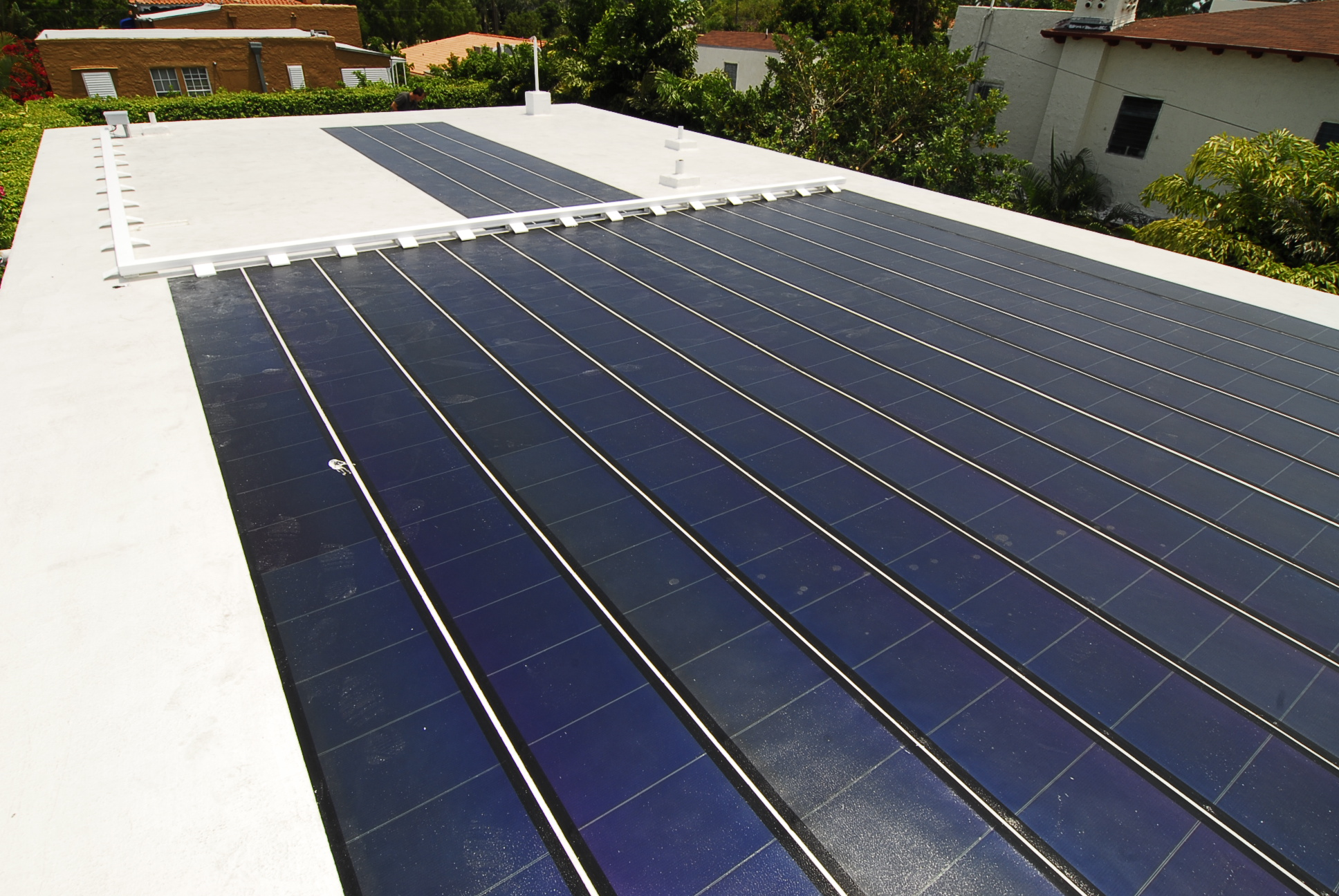
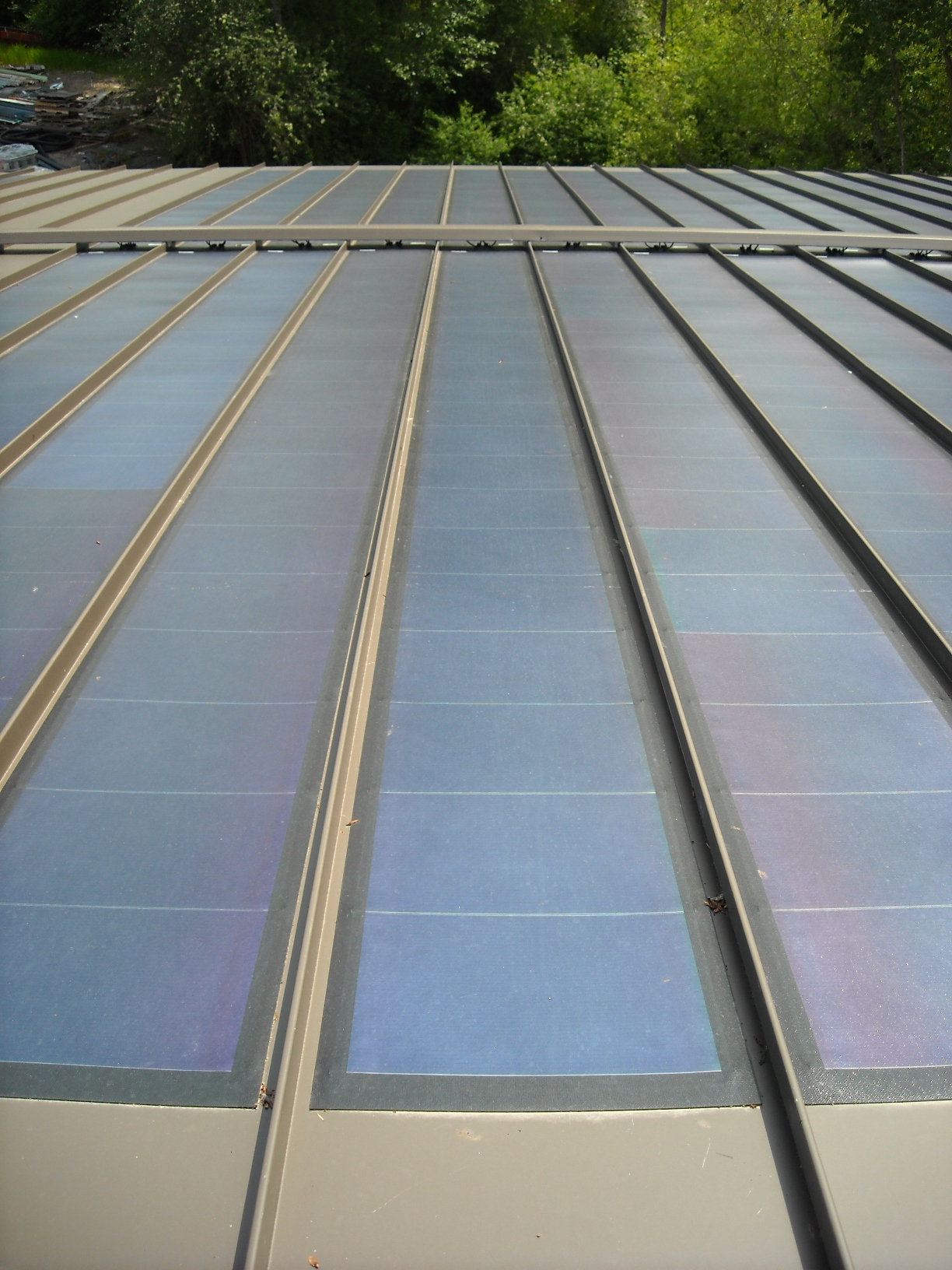
Thin-film solar cells, a second generation of photovoltaic (PV) solar cells:
- Top: thin-film silicon laminates being installed onto a roof.
- Middle: CIGS solar cell on a flexible plastic backing and rigid CdTe panels mounted on a supporting structure
- Bottom: thin-film laminates on rooftops

Thin-film solar cells are a type of solar cell made by depositing thin layers of photovoltaic material onto a glass, plastic or metal substrate. Thin-film solar cells are typically much thinner than the wafers used in conventional crystalline silicon based solar cells. Thin-film solar cells are commercially made with one of several materials including cadmium telluride (CdTe), copper indium gallium diselenide (CIGS), and amorphous thin-film silicon (a-Si, TF-Si).

Solar cells are often classified into generations based on the kinds of light-absorbing layers used to make them. The most well-established or first-generation solar cells are made of single- or multi-crystalline silicon. This is the dominant technology currently used in most solar PV systems. Most types of thin-film solar cells are classified as second generation, made using thin layers of materials like amorphous silicon (a-Si), cadmium telluride (CdTe), copper indium gallium selenide (CIGS), or gallium arsenide (GaAs). Solar cells made with newer, less established materials are classified as third-generation or emerging solar cells. This includes some innovative thin-film technologies, such as perovskite, dye-sensitized, quantum dot, organic, and CZTS thin-film solar cells.

Thin-film cells have several advantages over first-generation silicon solar cells, including being lighter and more flexible due to their thin construction. This makes them suitable for use in building-integrated photovoltaics and as semi-transparent photovoltaic glazing material that can be laminated onto windows. Other commercial applications use rigid thin film solar panels (interleaved between two panes of glass) in some of the world's largest photovoltaic power stations. Additionally, the materials used in thin-film solar cells are typically produced using simple and scalable methods more cost-effective than first-generation cells, leading to lower environmental impacts like greenhouse gas (GHG) emissions in many cases. Thin-film cells also typically outperform renewable and non-renewable sources for electricity generation in terms of human toxicity and heavy-metal emissions.

Despite initial challenges with efficient light conversion, especially among third-generation PV materials, as of 2023 some thin-film solar cells have reached efficiencies of up to 29.1% for single-junction thin-film GaAs cells, exceeding the maximum of 26.1% efficiency for standard single-junction first-generation solar cells. Multi-junction concentrator cells incorporating thin-film technologies have reached efficiencies of up to 47.6% as of 2023.

Many thin-film technologies have been found to have shorter operational lifetimes and larger degradation rates than first-generation cells in accelerated life testing, which has contributed to their somewhat limited deployment. Globally, the PV market share of thin-film technologies remains around 5% as of 2023. However, thin-film technology has become considerably more popular in the United States, where CdTe cells alone accounted for 29% of new utility-scale deployment in 2021.

=== Concentrator ===
Some special solar PV modules include concentrators in which light is focused by lenses or mirrors onto smaller cells. This enables the cost-effective use of highly efficient, but expensive cells (such as gallium arsenide) with the trade-off of using a higher solar exposure area. Concentrating the sunlight can also raise the efficiency to around 45%.

=== Light capture ===
Sketch of solar energy at different roof angles.

The amount of light absorbed by a solar cell depends on the sunlight angle of incidence and intensity. Light absorption varies because the amount falling on the panel is proportional to the cosine of the angle of incidence, and partly because at high angle of incidence more light is reflected. Modules usually are faced south (in the Northern Hemisphere) or north (in the Southern Hemisphere) with a particular tilt calculated according to the latitude, to maximize total energy output over a day. Solar tracking can be used to adjust the tilt angle from dawn to dusk, to keep the angle of incidence small. Bifacial panels are often installed vertically and oriented north-south to capture the most light from the east in the morning and west in the afternoon.

Photovoltaic manufacturers have been working to decrease reflectance with improved anti-reflective coatings or with textures. Anti-reflective coatings use one or more thin layers of substances with refractive indices intermediate between that of silicon and that of air, causing destructive interference of the reflected light.

=== Power curve ===
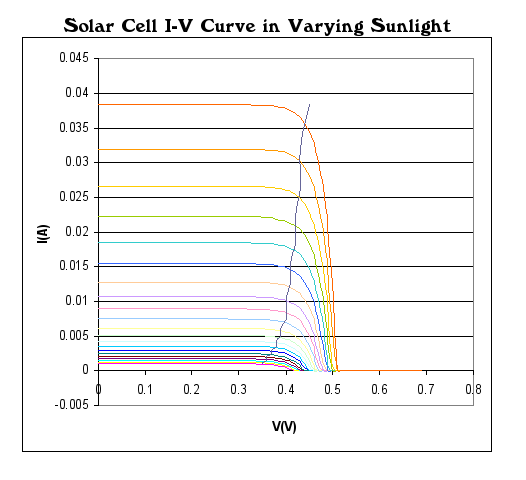
A typical voltage/current curve for individual unshadowed solar panels. Maximum power point tracking ensures that as much power as possible is collected.

In individual solar panels, if not enough current is taken, then power isn't maximised. If too much current is taken then the voltage collapses. The optimum current draw is roughly proportional to the amount of sunlight striking the panel. Solar panel capacity is specified by the MPP (maximum power point) value of solar panels in full sunlight.

=== Inverters ===
Solar inverters convert the direct current power provided by panels to alternating current power.

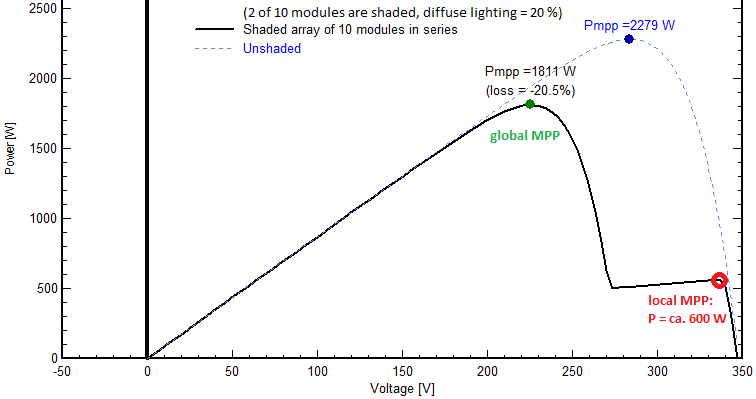
Power/Voltage-curve of a partially shaded PV module, with marked local and global MPP

MPP (Maximum power point) of the solar panel consists of MPP voltage (V_{mpp}) and MPP current (I_{mpp}). Performing maximum power point tracking, a solar inverter samples the output (I-V curve) from the solar cell and applies the proper electrical load to obtain maximum power.

An alternating current solar panel has a small direct current to alternating current microinverter on the back and produces alternating current power with no external direct current connector. Alternating current modules are defined by Underwriters Laboratories as the smallest and most complete system for harvesting solar energy.

Micro-inverters work independently to enable each panel to contribute its maximum possible output for a given amount of sunlight, but can be more expensive.

=== Solar panel interconnection ===
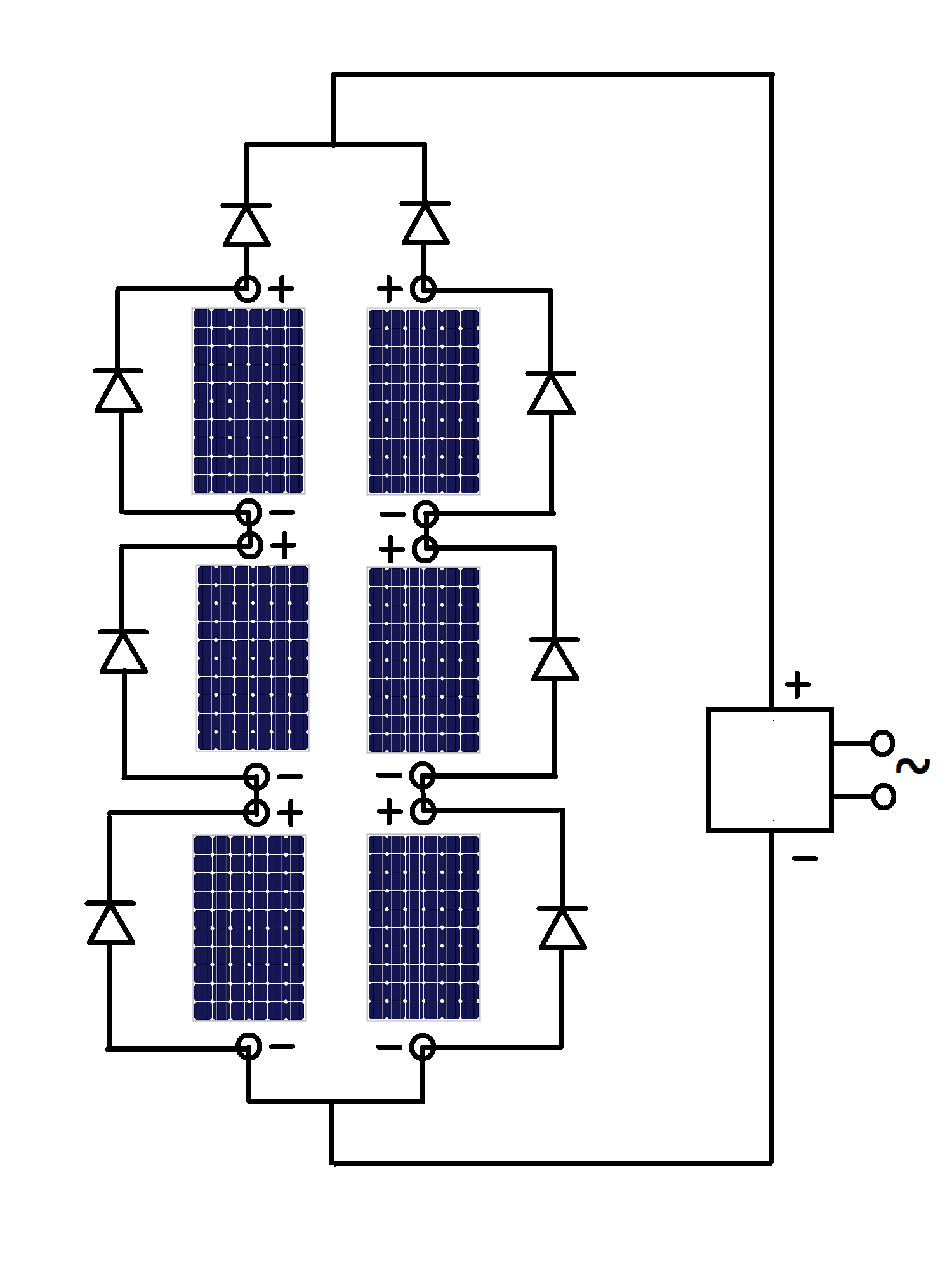
A connection example, a blocking diode is placed in series with each module string, whereas bypass diodes are placed in parallel with modules.

Solar panel electrical interconnections are made of conductors that carry current and are sized according to the current rating and fault conditions; sometimes including in-line fuses.

Panels are typically connected in series of one or more panels to form strings to achieve a desired output voltage, and strings can be connected in parallel to provide the desired current (ampere) capability of the PV system.

In string connections the voltages of the modules add, but the current is determined by the lowest performing panel. This is known as the "Christmas light effect". In parallel connections the voltages will be the same, but the currents add. Arrays are connected up to meet the voltage requirements of the inverters and to not greatly exceed the current limits.

Blocking and bypass diodes may be incorporated within the module or used externally to deal with partial array shading, in order to maximize output. For series connections, bypass diodes are placed in parallel with modules to allow current to bypass shaded modules with a lower output voltage which would severely limit the current. For paralleled connections, a blocking diode may be placed in series with each module's string to prevent current flowing backwards through shaded strings thus short-circuiting other strings. If three or more strings are connected in parallel, fuses are generally included on each string to eliminate the possibility of diode failures overloading the panels and wiring and causing fires.

=== Connectors ===
Outdoor solar panels usually include MC4 connectors, automotive solar panels may include an auxiliary power outlet and/or USB adapter and indoor panels may have a microinverter.

== Efficiency ==
Solar cell efficiency is the portion of energy in sunlight that is converted into electricity by a solar cell. Efficiency, in combination with latitude and weather, determine the energy output of a solar system.

As of 2024, the record for solar cell efficiency was 47.6%, set in May 2022 by Fraunhofer ISE, with a III-V four-junction concentrating photovoltaic (CPV) cell. The record in real-world conditions is held by NREL, which developed triple junction cells with a tested efficiency of 39.5%.

Commercial solar modules may exceed 24% efficiency. As of 2025, the best reached 24.5%, typically lower than their cells in isolation. The most efficient mass-produced solar modules have power density values of 175 W/m^{2} (16.22 W/ft^{2}).

In 2026 using triple III-V germanium cells and shingled matrix technology to interconnect cells, Fraunhofer achieved efficiency of 34.4%. An important innovation was the use of direct cell-to-cell contact, eliminating traditional solder-coated copper ribbons and the resulting shading of active cell areas.

Schematic of charge collection by solar cells. Light transmits through transparent conducting electrode creating electron hole pairs, which are collected by both the electrodes. The absorption and collection efficiencies of a solar cell depend on the design of transparent conductors and active layer thickness.

Several factors affect conversion efficiency, including its reflectance, thermodynamic efficiency, charge carrier separation efficiency, charge carrier collection efficiency and conduction efficiency values. Because these parameters are difficult to directly measure, other parameters are measured instead, including quantum efficiency, open-circuit voltage (V_{OC}) ratio, and § Fill factor. Reflectance losses are accounted for by the quantum efficiency value, as they affect external quantum efficiency. Recombination losses are accounted for by these factors. Resistive losses are predominantly accounted for by the fill factor value, but also contribute to the others.

Depending on construction, photovoltaic modules can produce electricity from a range of frequencies of light, but usually cannot cover the entire solar radiation range (specifically, ultraviolet, visible, infrared and low or diffused light). Hence, much of the incident sunlight energy is not processed by solar modules. Theoretically, sunlight could be split into wavelength bands (each a different color), each directed onto cells tuned to those ranges that would convert that band more efficiently.

== Performance and degradation ==
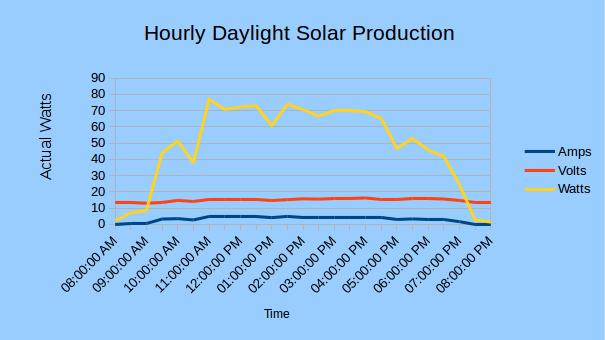

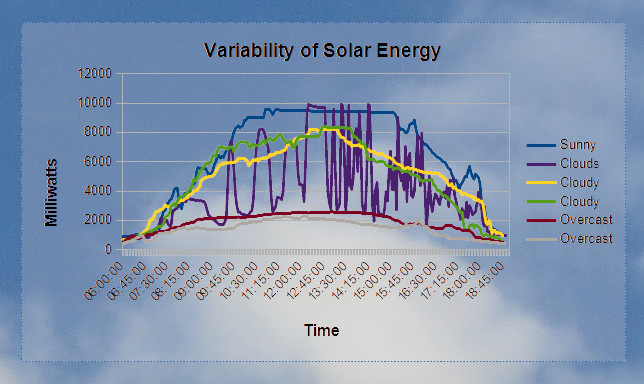
This chart illustrates the effect of clouds on solar energy production.

Module performance is generally rated under standard test conditions: irradiance of 1,000 W/m^{2}, solar spectrum of AM 1.5 and module temperature at 25 °C. The actual voltage and current output of the module changes as lighting, temperature and load conditions change, so there is never one specific voltage at which the module operates. Performance varies depending on geographic location, time of day, the day of the year, amount of solar irradiance, direction and tilt of modules, cloud cover, shading, soiling, state of charge, and temperature. Performance of a module or panel can be measured at different time intervals with a direct current clamp meter or shunt and logged, graphed, or charted with a chart recorder or data logger.

For optimum performance, a solar panel string needs to be made of similar electrical voltage solar panels oriented in the same direction perpendicular to direct sunlight. Bypass diodes are used to optimize output by allowing continuous current flow by circumventing broken or shaded panels.

Electrical characteristics include nominal power (P_{MAX}, measured in W), open-circuit voltage (V_{OC}), short-circuit current (I_{SC}, measured in amperes), maximum power voltage (V_{MPP}), maximum power current (I_{MPP}), peak power, (watt-peak, W_{p}), and module efficiency (%).

Open-circuit voltage or V_{OC} is the maximum voltage the module can produce when not connected to an electrical circuit or system. V_{OC} can be measured with a voltmeter directly on an illuminated module's terminals or on its disconnected cable.

The peak power rating, W_{p}, is the maximum output under standard test conditions (not the maximum possible output). Typical modules, which could measure approximately 1 by 2 metres (3 ft × 7 ft), will be rated from as low as 75 W to as high as 600 W, depending on their efficiency. At the time of testing, the test modules are binned according to their test results, and a typical manufacturer might rate their modules in 5 W increments, and either rate them at +/- 3%, +/-5%, +3/-0% or +5/-0%.

=== Influence of temperature ===
The performance of a photovoltaic (PV) module depends on the environmental conditions, mainly on the global incident irradiance G in the plane of the module. However, the temperature T of the p–n junction also influences the main electrical parameters: the short circuit current I_{SC}, the open circuit voltage V_{OC} and the maximum power P_{max}. In general, it is known that V_{OC} shows a significant inverse correlation with T, while for I_{SC} this correlation is direct, but weaker, so that this increase does not compensate for the decrease in V_{OC}. As a consequence, P_{max} decreases when T increases. This correlation between the power output of a solar cell and the working temperature of its junction depends on the semiconductor material, and is due to the influence of T on the concentration, lifetime, and mobility of the intrinsic carriers, i.e., electrons and gaps. inside the photovoltaic cell.

Temperature sensitivity is usually described by temperature coefficients, each of which expresses the derivative of the parameter to which it refers with respect to the junction temperature. The values of these parameters can be found in any data sheet of the photovoltaic module; are the following:

- β: V_{OC} variation coefficient with respect to T, given by ∂V_{OC}/∂T.

- α: Coefficient of variation of I_{SC} with respect to T, given by ∂I_{SC}/∂T.

- δ: Coefficient of variation of P_{max} with respect to T, given by ∂P_{max}/∂T.

Techniques for estimating these coefficients from experimental data can be found in the literature

Studies have shown that while high temperatures negatively impact efficiency, colder temperatures can improve solar panel performance due to reduced electrical resistance within the cells. However, winter conditions introduce additional challenges such as snow accumulation and reduced daylight hours, which can offset the efficiency benefits of lower temperatures. Solar panels are still capable of generating power in winter, but overall output may be lower due to limited sunlight exposure and potential obstructions.

=== Degradation ===
The ability of solar modules to withstand damage by rain, hail, heavy snow load, and cycles of heat and cold varies by manufacturer, although most solar panels on the U.S. market are UL listed, meaning they have gone through testing to withstand hail.

Potential-induced degradation (also called PID) is a potential-induced performance degradation in crystalline photovoltaic modules, caused by so-called stray currents. This effect may cause power loss of up to 30%.

The power output of a photovoltaic (PV) device decreases over time due to exposure to solar radiation as well as other external conditions. The degradation index, defined as the annual percentage of output power loss, is a key factor in determining the long-term production of a photovoltaic plant. To estimate this degradation, the percentage of decrease associated with each of the electrical parameters is calculated. Individual degradation of a solar panel can negatively influence the performance of a complete string. Furthermore, not all solar panels in the same installation decrease their performance at exactly the same rate.

There are several studies dealing with the power degradation analysis of solar panels based on different photovoltaic technologies available in the literature. According to a recent study, the degradation of crystalline silicon solar panels is linear, between 0.8% and 1.0% per year.

On the other hand, when analyzing the performance of thin-film photovoltaic modules, an initial period of strong degradation is observed, which can last several months and even up to 2 years. This is followed by a later stage in which the degradation stabilizes, being then comparable to that of crystalline silicon. Strong seasonal variations are also observed in such thin-film technologies because the influence of the solar spectrum is much greater.

Solar panels of amorphous silicon, micromorphic silicon or cadmium telluride, can have annual degradation rates for the first years of between 3% and 4%.

Copper indium gallium selenide solar panels show lower degradation rates than crystalline silicon, even in early years.

== Mounting and tracking ==
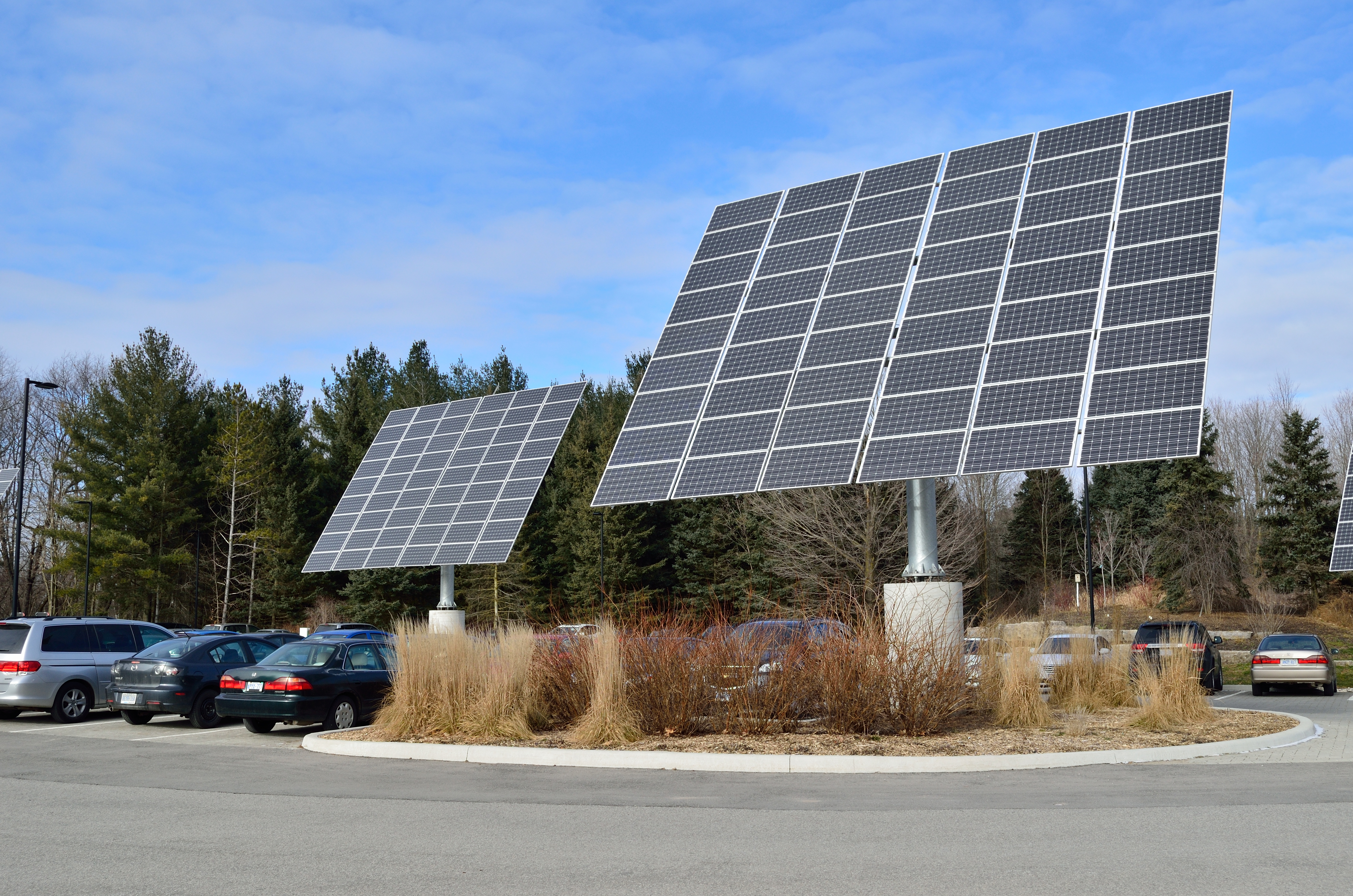
Solar modules mounted on solar trackers

=== Ground ===
Large utility-scale solar power plants frequently use ground-mounted photovoltaic systems. Their solar modules are held in place by racks or frames that are attached to ground-based mounting supports. Ground based mounting supports include:

- Pole mounts, which are driven directly into the ground or embedded in concrete.
- Foundation mounts, such as concrete slabs or poured footings
- Ballasted footing mounts, such as concrete or steel bases that use weight to secure the solar module system in position and do not require ground penetration. This type of mounting system is well suited for sites where excavation is not possible such as capped landfills and simplifies decommissioning or relocation of solar module systems.
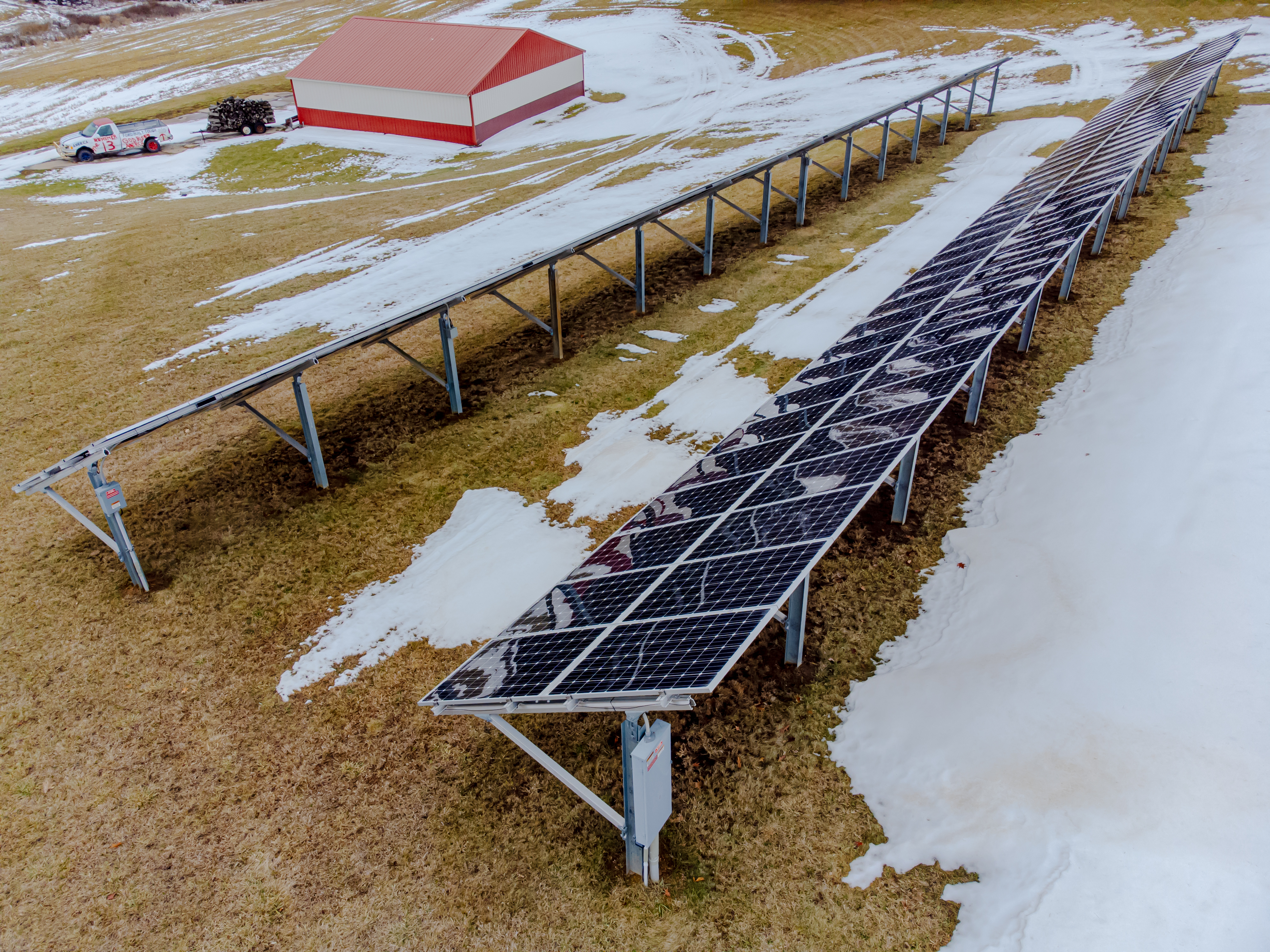
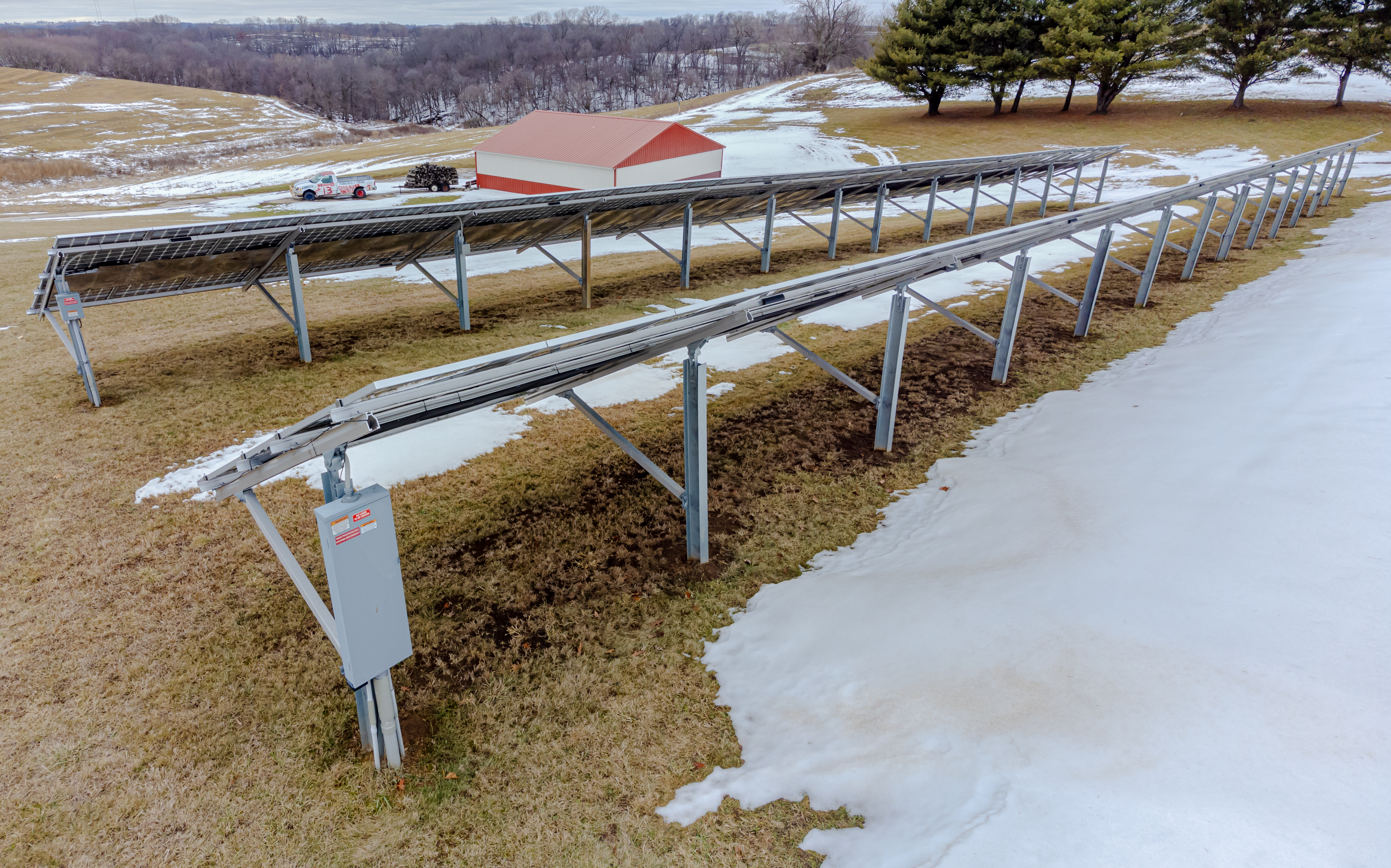
Solar array ground mounting

==== Vertical bifacial solar array ====
Vertical bifacial solar panels are oriented towards east and west rather than south, this allows them to utilize the sun's irradiance more efficiently in the morning and evening. In most cases this results in a slightly lower total output, but matches energy demand better than a south facing installation and helps reduce the duck curve problem. Applications include agrivoltaics, solar fencing, highway and railroad noise dampeners and barricades. Vertical bifacial solar panels are well suited for high-latitude locations, such as the Nordics, due to the low average solar altitude angle.

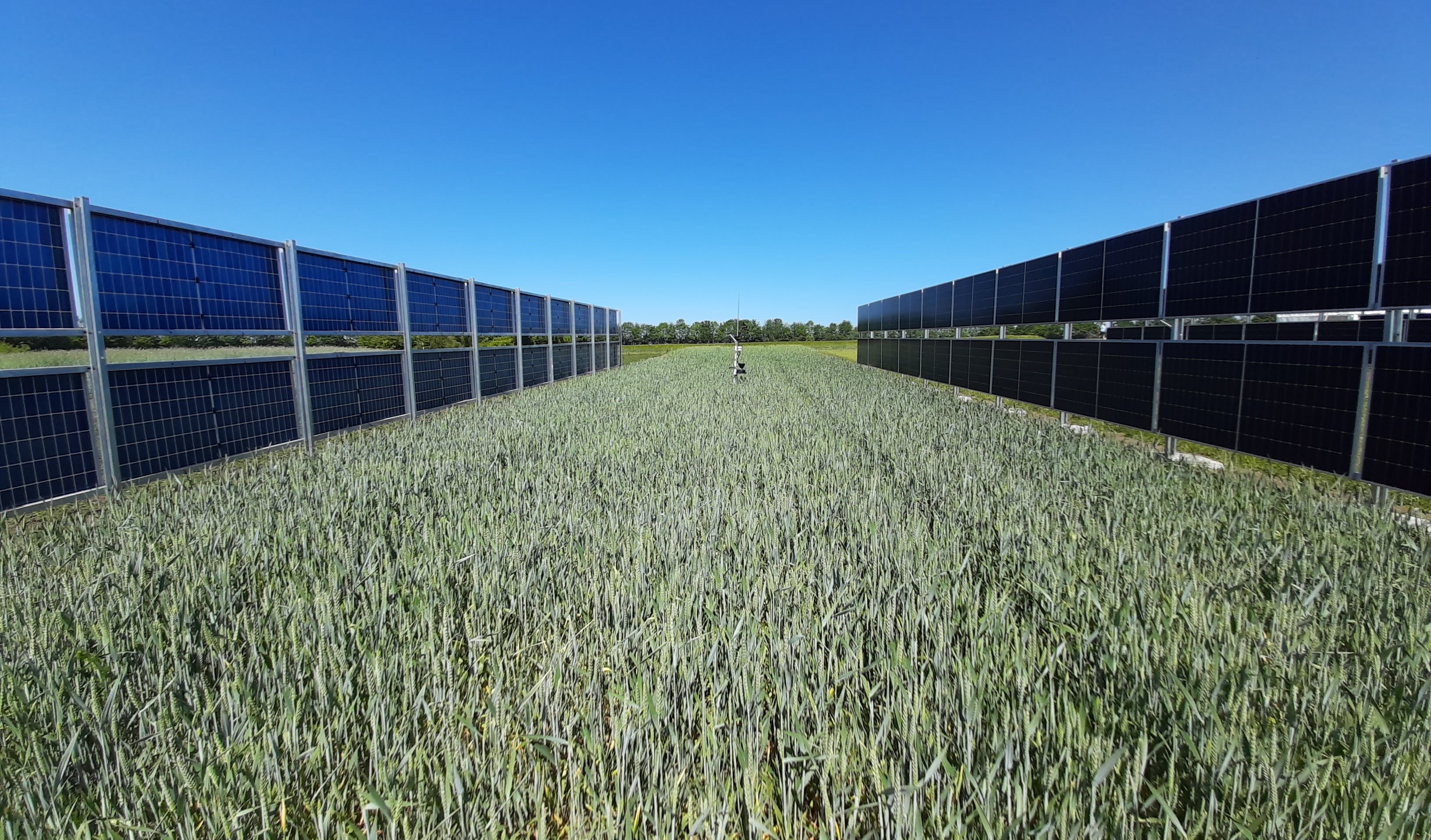
Agrivoltaic vertical bifacial solar panels

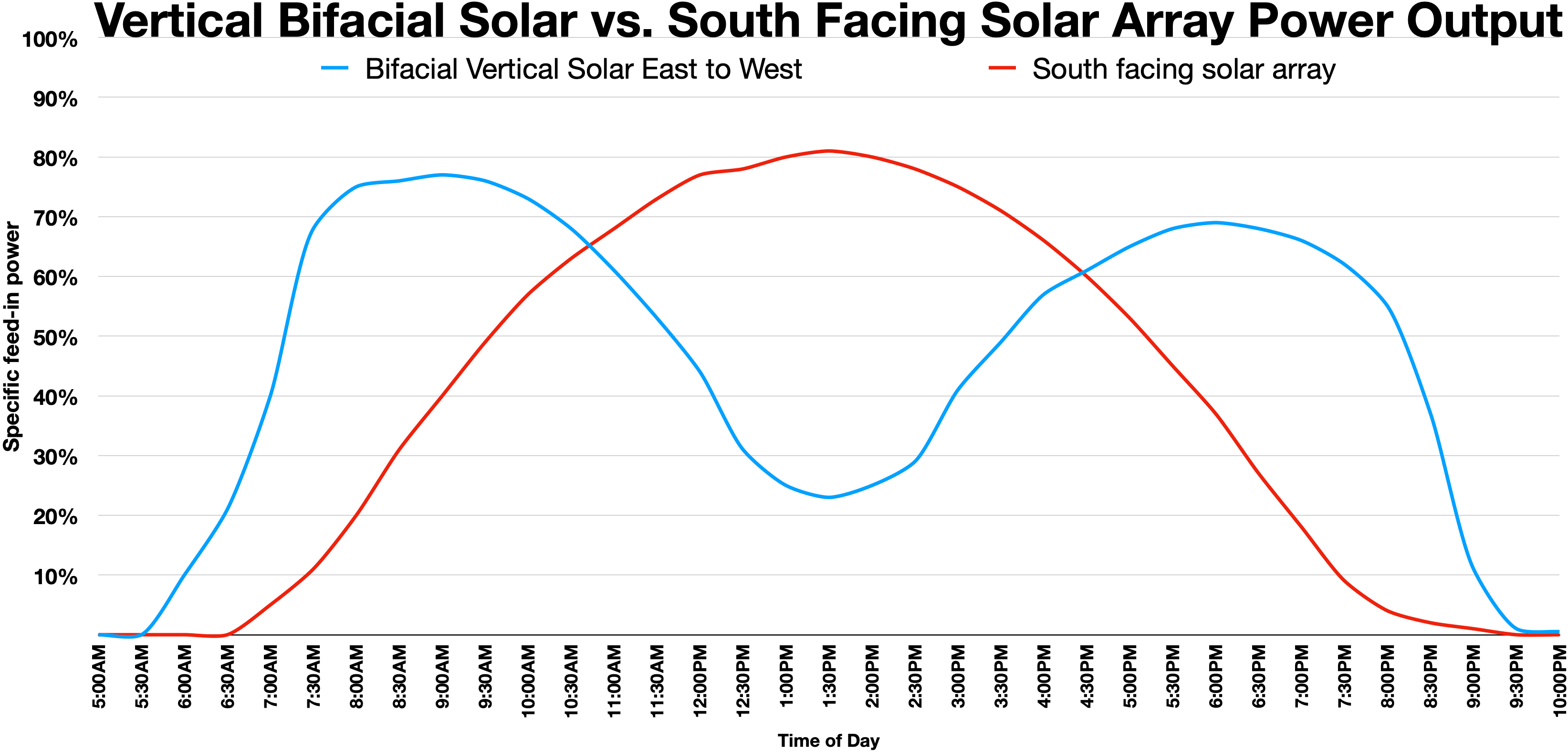
Vertical Bifacial vs south facing solar array power output

=== Roof ===
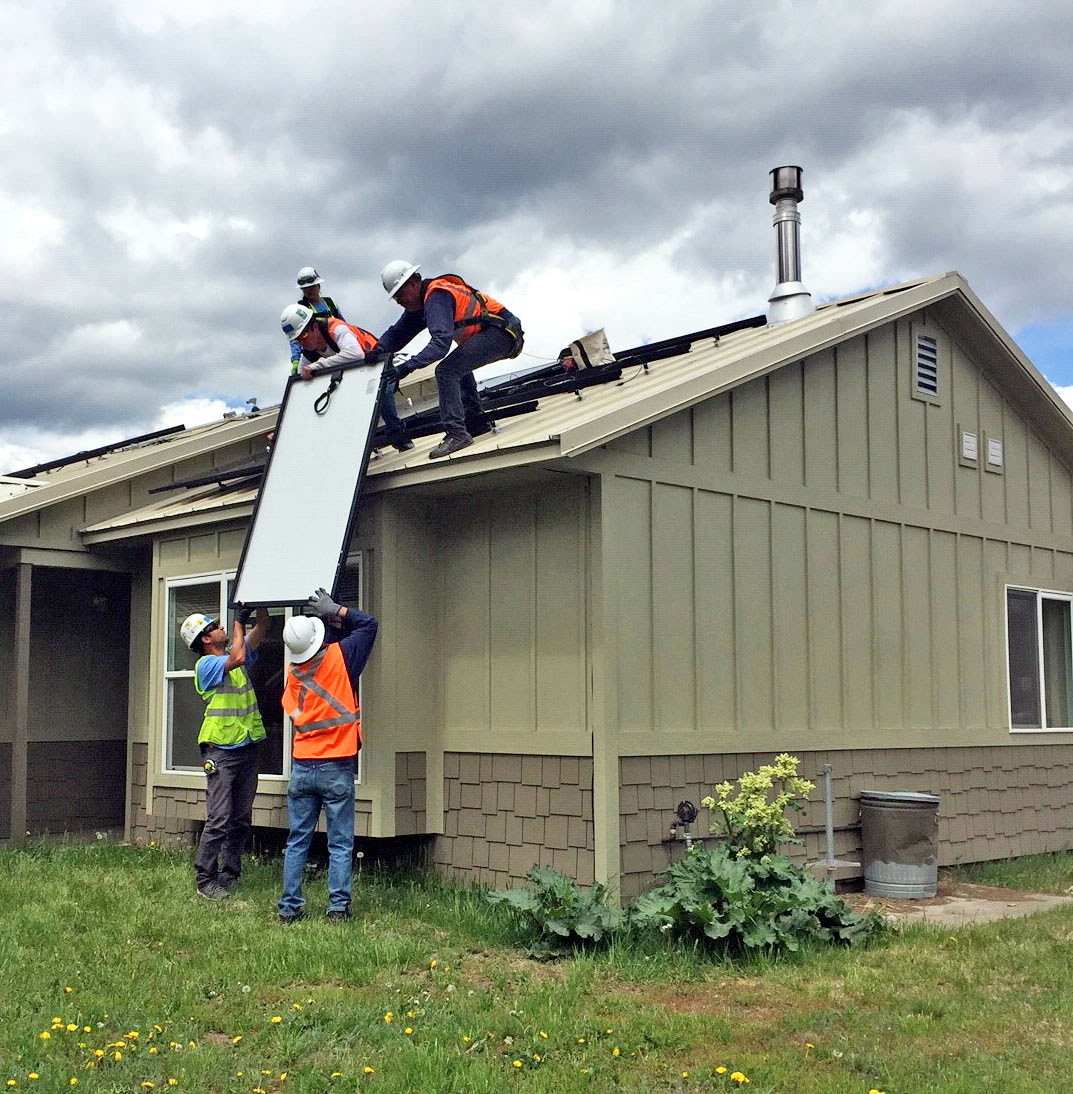
Installing residential rooftop solar panels

Roof-mounted solar power systems consist of solar modules held in place by racks or frames attached to roof-based mounting supports. Roof-based mounting supports include:

- Rail mounts, which are attached directly to the roof structure and may use additional rails for attaching the module racking or frames.
- Ballasted footing mounts, such as concrete or steel bases that use weight to secure the panel system in position and do not require through penetration. This mounting method allows for decommissioning or relocation of solar panel systems with no adverse effect on the roof structure.
- All wiring connecting adjacent solar modules to the energy harvesting equipment must be installed according to local electrical codes and should be run in a conduit appropriate for the climate conditions

==== Solar canopy ====
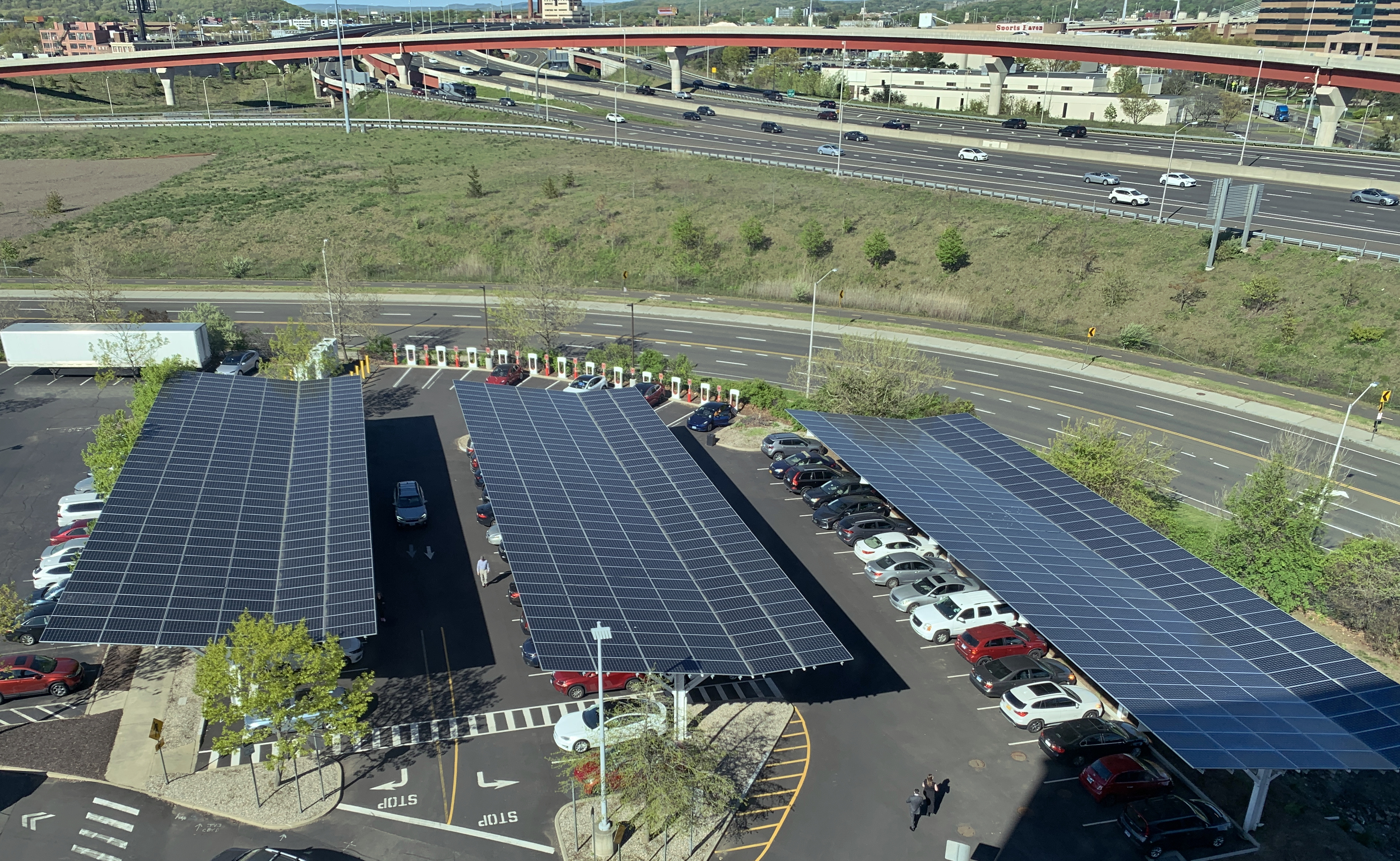
Solar canopy parking lot in New Haven at Hotel Marcel. There are EV level 2 chargers underneath the canopy and a 12-stall Tesla Supercharger behind.

Solar canopies are solar arrays which are installed on top of a traditional canopy. These canopies could be a parking lot canopy, carport, gazebo, Pergola, or patio cover.

There are many benefits, which include maximizing the space available in urban areas while also providing shade for cars. The energy produced can be used to create electric vehicle (EV) charging stations.

=== Portable ===
Portable solar panels can ensure electric current, enough to charge devices (mobile, radio, ...) via USB-port or to charge a powerbank.

Special features of portable solar panels include high flexibility, high durability & waterproof characteristics good for travel and camping.

=== Tracking ===
Solar trackers increase the energy produced per module at the cost of mechanical complexity and increased need for maintenance. They sense the direction of the Sun and tilt or rotate the modules as needed for maximum exposure to the light.

Alternatively, fixed racks can hold modules stationary throughout the day at a given tilt (zenith angle) and facing a given direction (azimuth angle). Tilt angles equivalent to an installation's latitude are common. Some systems may also adjust the tilt angle based on the time of year.

On the other hand, east- and west-facing arrays (covering an east–west facing roof, for example) are commonly deployed. Even though such installations will not produce the maximum possible average power from the individual solar panels, the cost of the panels is now usually cheaper than the tracking mechanism and they can provide more economically valuable power during morning and evening peak demands than north or south facing systems.

== Maintenance ==
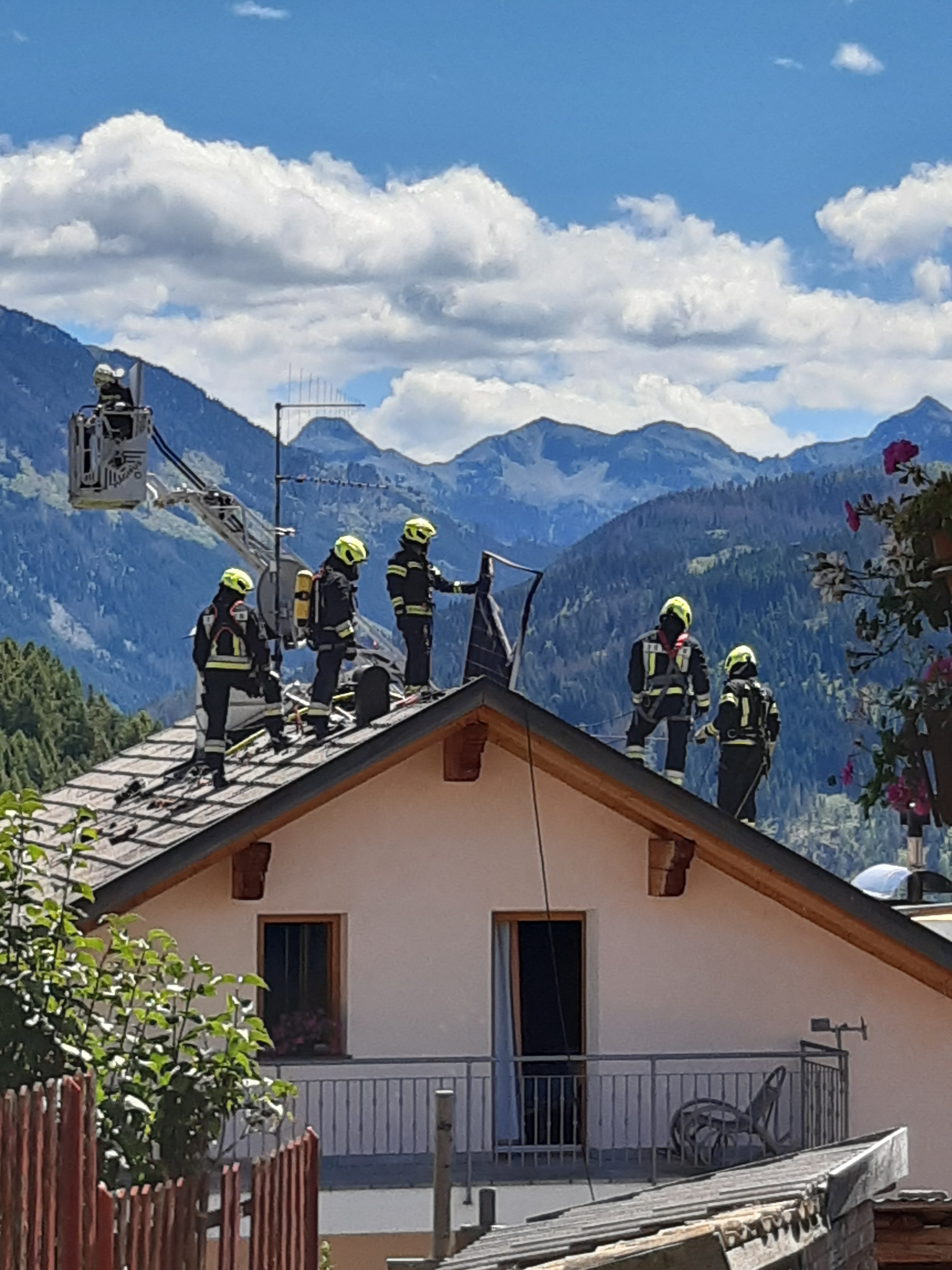
Local fire service attending a rooftop solar panel fire in South Tyrol. The fireman atop the roofline is holding a burnt-out panel.

Solar panel conversion efficiency, typically in the 20% range, is reduced by the accumulation of dust, grime, pollen, and other particulates on the solar panels, collectively referred to as soiling. "A dirty solar panel can reduce its power capabilities by up to 30% in high dust/pollen or desert areas", says Seamus Curran, associate professor of physics at the University of Houston and director of the Institute for NanoEnergy, which specializes in the design, engineering, and assembly of nanostructures. The average soiling loss in the world in 2018 is estimated to be at least 3% – 4%.

Paying to have solar panels cleaned is a good investment in many regions, as of 2019. However, in some regions, cleaning is not cost-effective. In California as of 2013 soiling-induced financial losses were rarely enough to warrant the cost of washing the panels. On average, panels in California lost a little less than 0.05% of their overall efficiency per day.

There are also occupational hazards with solar panel installation and maintenance. A 2015–2018 study in the UK investigated 80 PV-related incidents of fire, with over 20 "serious fires" directly caused by PV installation, including 37 domestic buildings and 6 solar farms. In 1/3 of the incidents a root cause was not established and in a majority of others was caused by poor installation, faulty product or design issues. The most frequent single element causing fires was the direct current isolators.

A 2021 study by kWh Analytics found that at a system level, the median annual degradation of PV installations was 1.09% for residential and 0.8% for non-residential. This was significantly more than the common industry assumption of 0.5% per year, which was taken from an estimate of panel-level degradation. A 2021 module reliability study found an increasing trend in solar module failure rates with 30% of manufacturers experiencing safety failures related to junction boxes (growth from 20%) and 26% bill-of-materials failures (growth from 20%).

=== Cleaning ===
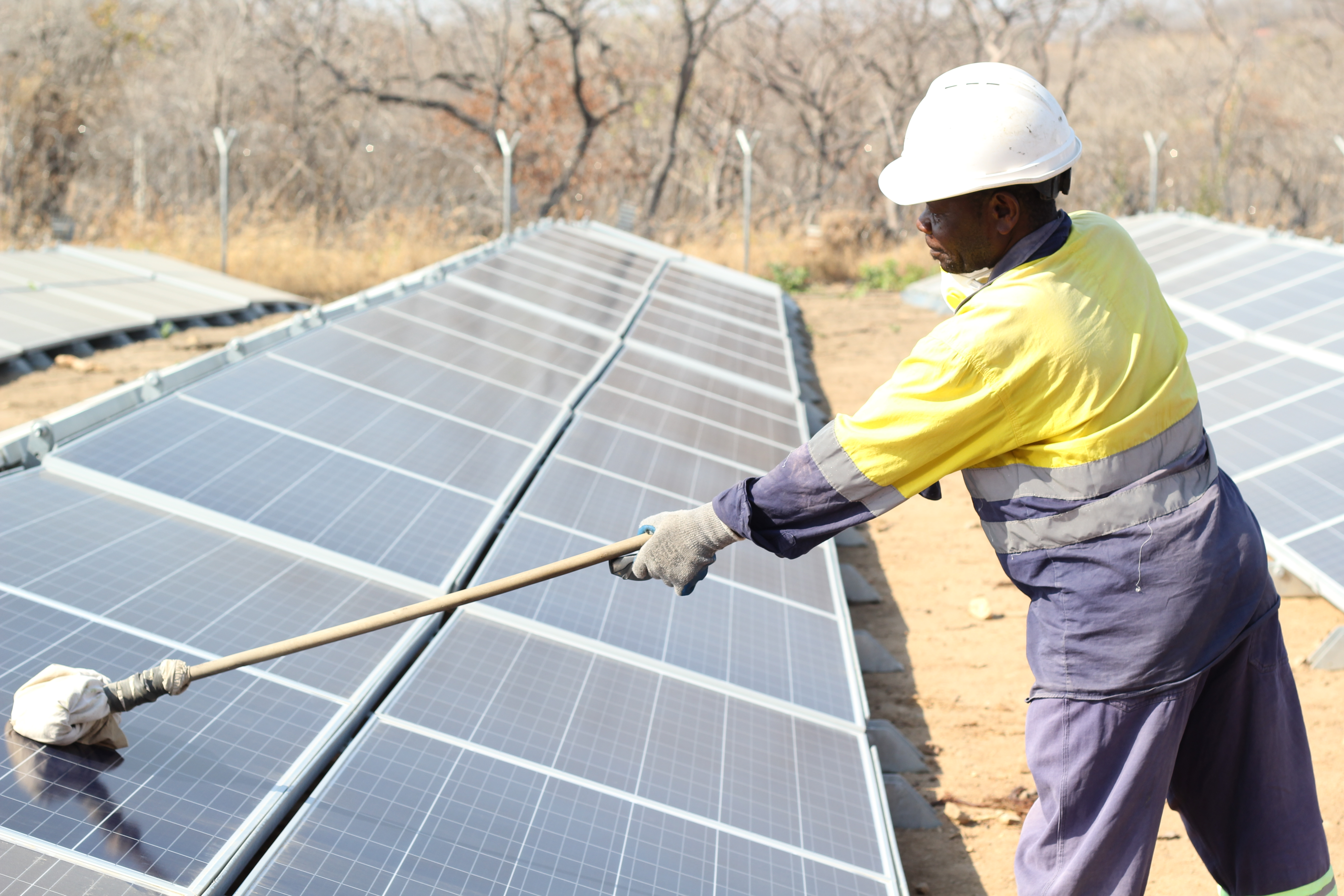
General cleaning of ground-based solar panels at the Shanta Gold mine in Tanzania

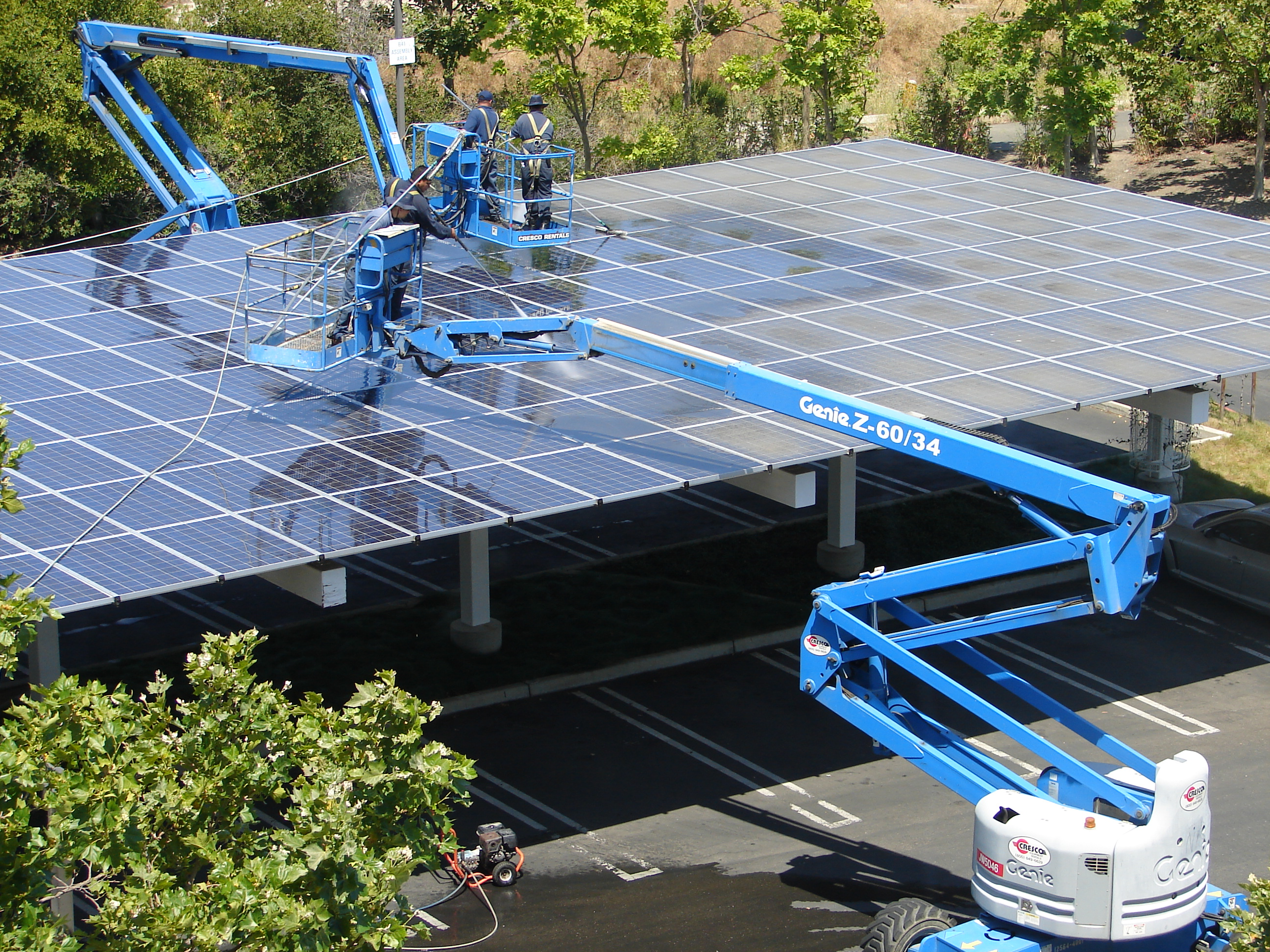
Deeper level of cleaning with pressure washing of the car port solar panels at Googleplex, Mountain View, California

Cleaning methods for solar panels can be divided into 5 groups: manual tools, mechanized tools (such as tractor mounted brushes), installed hydraulic systems (such as sprinklers), installed robotic systems, and deployable robots. Manual cleaning tools are by far the most prevalent method of cleaning, most likely because of the low purchase cost. However, in a Saudi Arabian study done in 2014, it was found that "installed robotic systems, mechanized systems, and installed hydraulic systems are likely the three most promising technologies for use in cleaning solar panels".

Novel self-cleaning mechanisms for solar panels are being developed. For instance, in 2019 via wet-chemically etched nanowires and a hydrophobic coating on the surface water droplets could remove 98% of dust particles, which may be especially relevant for applications in the desert.

In March 2022, MIT researchers announced the development of a waterless cleaning system for solar panels and mirrors to address the issue of dust accumulation, which can reduce solar output by up to 30 percent in one month. This system utilizes electrostatic repulsion to detach dust particles from the panel's surface, eliminating the need for water or brushes. An electrical charge imparted to the dust particles by passing a simple electrode over the panel causes them to be repelled by a charge applied to the panel itself. The system can be automated using a basic electric motor and guide rails.

== Waste and recycling ==
There were 30 thousand tonnes of PV waste in 2021, and the annual amount was estimated by Bloomberg NEF to rise to more than 1 million tons by 2035 and more than 10 million by 2050. For comparison, 750 million tons of fly ash waste was produced by coal power in 2022. In the United States, around 90% of decommissioned solar panels end up in landfills as of 2023. Most parts of a solar module can be recycled including up to 95% of certain semiconductor materials or the glass as well as large amounts of ferrous and non-ferrous metals. Some private companies and non-profit organizations take-back and recycle end-of-life modules. EU law requires manufacturers to ensure their solar panels are recycled properly. Similar legislation is underway in Japan, India, and Australia. A 2023 Australian report said that there is a market for quality used panels and made recommendations for increasing reuse, but rules have not been implemented.

Recycling possibilities depend on the kind of technology used in the modules:

- Silicon based modules: aluminum frames and junction boxes are dismantled manually at the beginning of the process. The module is then crushed in a mill and the different fractions are separated – glass, plastics and metals. It is possible to recover more than 80% of the incoming weight. This process can be performed by flat glass recyclers, since the shape and composition of a PV module is similar to flat glass used in the building and automotive industry. The recovered glass, for example, is readily accepted by the glass foam and glass insulation industry.
- Non-silicon based modules: they require specific recycling technologies such as the use of chemical baths in order to separate the different semiconductor materials. For cadmium telluride modules, the recycling process begins by crushing the module and subsequently separating the different fractions. This recycling process is designed to recover up to 90% of the glass and 95% of the semiconductor materials contained. Some commercial-scale recycling facilities have been created in recent years by private companies.

Since 2010, there is an annual European conference bringing together manufacturers, recyclers and researchers to look at the future of PV module recycling.

== Production ==
Top producers of PV systems, by shipped capacity in gigawatts
Module producer	Shipments in 2019 (GW)
Jinko Solar	14.2
JA Solar	10.3
Trina Solar	9.7
LONGi Solar	9.0
Canadian Solar	8.5
Hanwha Q Cells	7.3
Risen Energy	7.0
First Solar	5.5
GCL System	4.8
Shunfeng Photovoltaic	4.0

The production of PV systems has followed a classic learning curve effect, with significant cost reduction occurring alongside large rises in efficiency and production output.

With over 100% year-on-year growth in PV system installation, PV module makers dramatically increased their shipments of solar modules in 2019. They actively expanded their capacity and turned themselves into gigawatt GW players. According to Pulse Solar, five of the top ten PV module companies in 2019 have experienced a rise in solar panel production by at least 25% compared to 2019.

The basis of producing most solar panels is mostly on the use of silicon cells. These silicon cells are typically 10–20% efficient at converting sunlight into electricity, with newer production models exceeding 22%.

In 2018, the world's top five solar module producers in terms of shipped capacity during the calendar year of 2018 were Jinko Solar, JA Solar, Trina Solar, Longi solar, and Canadian Solar.

=== Environmental impact ===
The manufacture of PV panels depends on the use of toxic and reactive chemicals. These include cadmium telluride, copper indium selenide, cadmium gallium (di)selenide, copper indium gallium (di)selenide, hexafluoroethane, lead, and polyvinyl fluoride. Byproducts include silicon tetrachloride. Silicon dust ("kerf") is produced when the silicon wafers are sawn.

== Price ==
Swanson's law–stating that solar module prices have dropped about 20% for each doubling of installed capacity—defines the "learning rate" of solar photovoltaics.

The price of solar electrical power has continued to fall so that in many countries it has become cheaper than fossil fuel electricity from the electricity grid since 2012, a phenomenon known as grid parity. With the rise of global awareness, institutions such as the IRS have adopted a tax credit format, refunding a portion of any solar panel array for private use. The price of a solar array only continues to fall.

Average pricing information divides in three pricing categories: those buying small quantities (modules of all sizes in the kilowatt range annually), mid-range buyers (typically up to 10 MWp annually), and large quantity buyers (self-explanatory—and with access to the lowest prices). Over the long term there is clearly a systematic reduction in the price of cells and modules. For example, in 2012 it was estimated that the quantity cost per watt was about US$0.60, which was 250 times lower than the cost in 1970 of US$150. A 2015 study shows price/kWh dropping by 10% per year since 1980, and predicts that solar could contribute 20% of total electricity consumption by 2030, whereas the International Energy Agency predicts 16% by 2050.

Real-world energy production costs depend a great deal on local weather conditions. In a cloudy country such as the United Kingdom, the cost per produced kWh is higher than in sunnier countries like Spain.

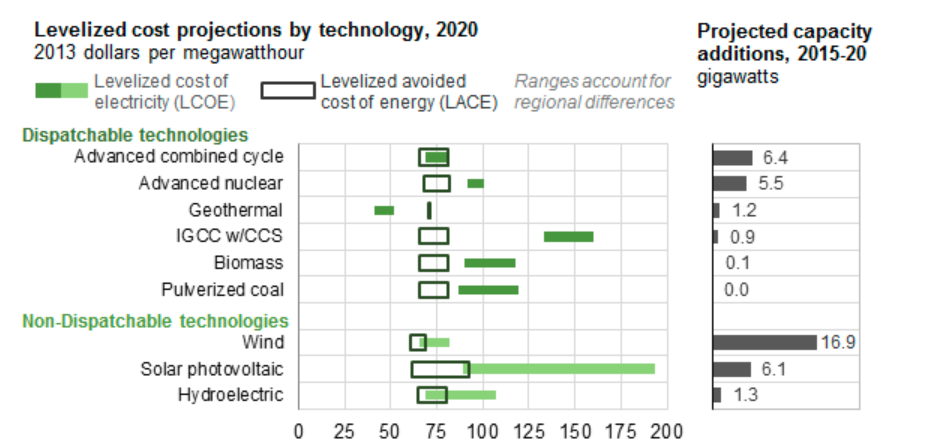
Short term normalized cost comparisons demonstrating value of various electric generation technologies

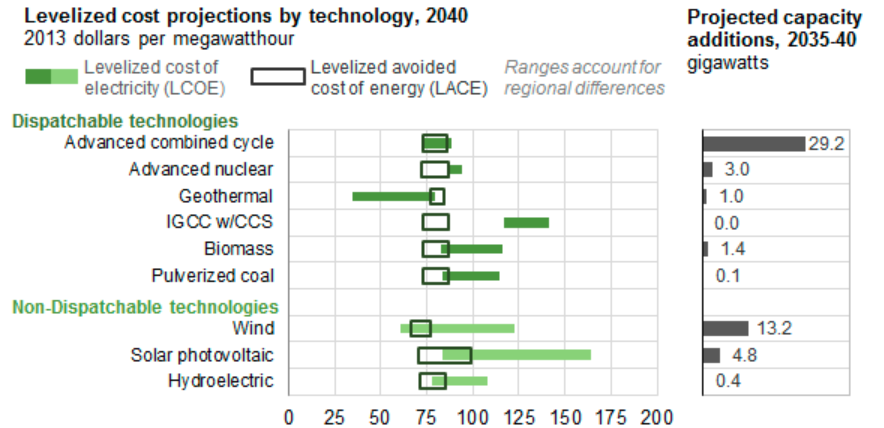
Long term normalized cost comparisons demonstrating value of various electric generation technologies

According to RMI, the Balance-of-System (BoS) elements -- the non-module cost of non-microinverter solar modules (as wiring, converters, racking systems and various components) -- make up about half of the total costs of installations.

For merchant solar power stations, where the electricity is being sold into the electricity transmission network, the cost of solar energy will need to match the wholesale electricity price. This point is sometimes called 'wholesale grid parity' or 'busbar parity'.

== Standards ==
Standards generally used in photovoltaic modules:

- IEC 61215 (crystalline silicon performance), 61646 (thin film performance) and 61730 (all modules, safety), 61853 (Photovoltaic module performance testing & energy rating)
- ISO 9488 Solar energy—Vocabulary.
- UL 1703 from Underwriters Laboratories
- UL 1741 from Underwriters Laboratories
- UL 2703 from Underwriters Laboratories
- CE mark
- Electrical Safety Tester (EST) Series (EST-460, EST-22V, EST-22H, EST-110).

== Applications ==
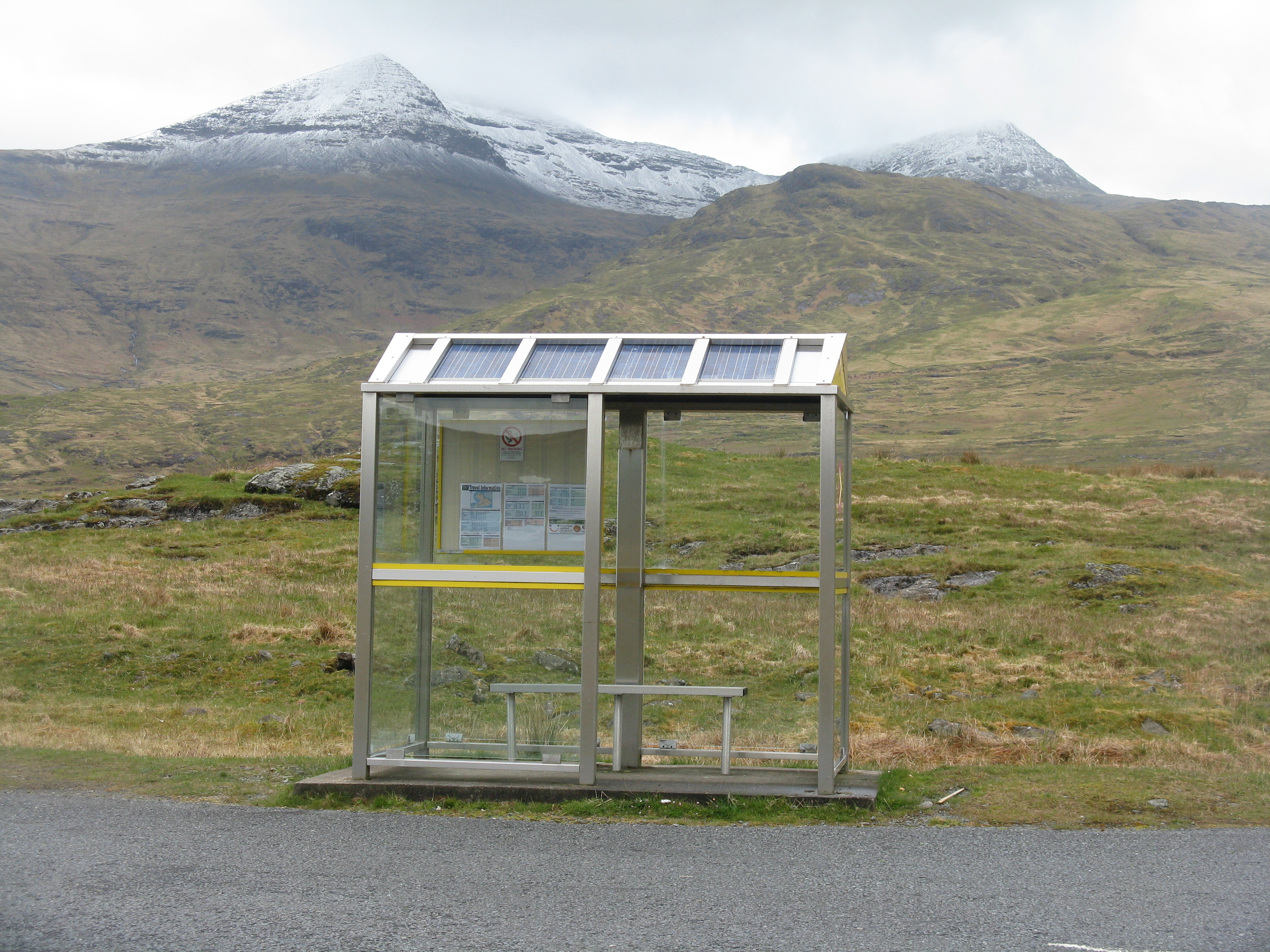
Solar panels on the roof of a bus shelter

There are many practical applications for the use of solar panels or photovoltaics. It can first be used in agriculture as a power source for irrigation. In health care solar panels can be used to refrigerate medical supplies. It can also be used for infrastructure. PV modules are used in photovoltaic systems and include a large variety of electric devices.

== Limitations ==
=== Impact on electricity network ===
With the increasing levels of rooftop photovoltaic systems, the energy flow becomes 2-way. When there is more local generation than consumption, electricity is exported to the grid. However, an electricity network traditionally is not designed to deal with the 2- way energy transfer. Therefore, some technical issues may occur. For example, in Queensland Australia, more than 30% of households used rooftop PV by the end of 2017. The duck curve appeared often for a lot of communities from 2015 onwards. An over-voltage issue may result as the electricity flows from PV households back to the network. There are solutions to manage the over voltage issue, such as regulating PV inverter power factor, new voltage and energy control equipment at the electricity distributor level, re-conducting the electricity wires, demand side management, etc. There are often limitations and costs related to these solutions.

For rooftop solar to be able to provide enough backup power during a power cut a battery is often also required.

== Quality assurance ==
Solar module quality assurance involves testing and evaluating solar cells and Solar Panels to ensure the quality requirements of them are met. Solar modules (or panels) are expected to have a long service life between 20 and 40 years. They should continually and reliably convey and deliver the power anticipated. Solar modules can be tested through a combination of physical tests, laboratory studies, and numerical analyses. Furthermore, solar modules need to be assessed throughout the different stages of their life cycle. Various companies such as Southern Research Energy & Environment, SGS Consumer Testing Services, TÜV Rheinland, Sinovoltaics, Clean Energy Associates (CEA), CSA Solar International and Enertis provide services in solar module quality assurance."The implementation of consistent traceable and stable manufacturing processes becomes mandatory to safeguard and ensure the quality of the PV Modules" Certification is carried out according to standards ANSI/UL1703, IEC 17025, IEC 61215, IEC 61701, and IEC 61730-1/-2

== See also ==
- Daisy chain (electrical engineering)
- Digital modeling and fabrication
- Domestic energy consumption
- Grid-tied electrical system
- Growth of photovoltaics
- Solar charger
- Solar cooker
- Solar car
- Solar cell
