= Soiling (solar energy) =

Accumulation of material on solar energy collectors

Soiling is the accumulation of material on light-collecting surfaces in solar power systems. The accumulated material blocks or scatters incident light, which leads to a loss in power output. Typical soiling materials include mineral dust, bird droppings, fungi, lichen, pollen, engine exhaust, and agricultural emissions. Soiling affects conventional photovoltaic systems, concentrated photovoltaics, and concentrated solar (thermal) power. However, the consequences of soiling are higher for concentrating systems than for non-concentrating systems. Note that soiling refers to both the process of accumulation and the accumulated material itself.

There are several ways to reduce the effect of soiling. The antisoiling coating is most important solution for solar power projects. But water cleaning is the most widely used technique so far due to absence of antisoiling coatings in past. Soiling losses vary largely from region to region, and within regions. Average soiling-induced power losses can be below one percent in regions with frequent rain. As of 2018, the estimated global average annual power loss due to soiling is 5% to 10% percent. The estimated soiling-induced revenue loss is 3 – 5 billion euros.

== Physics of soiling ==
Soiling is typically caused by the deposition of airborne particles, including, but not limited to, mineral dust (silica, metal oxides, salts), pollen, and soot. However, soiling also includes snow, ice, frost, various kinds of industry pollution, sulfuric acid particulates, bird droppings, falling leaves, agricultural feed dust, and the growth of algae, moss, fungi, lichen, or biofilms of bacteria. Which of these soiling mechanisms are most prominent depends on the location.

Soiling either blocks the light completely (hard shading), or it lets through some sunlight (soft shading). With soft shading, parts of the transmitted light is scattered. Scattering makes the light diffuse, i.e. the rays go in many different directions. While conventional photovoltaics works well with diffuse light, concentrated solar power and concentrated photovoltaics relies only on the (collimated) light coming directly from the sun. For this reason, concentrated solar power is more sensitive to soiling than conventional photovoltaics. Typical soiling-induced power losses are 8-14 times higher for concentrated solar power than for photovoltaics.

=== Influence of geography and meteorology ===
Soiling losses vary greatly from region to region, and within regions.

The rate at which soiling deposits depends on geographical factors such as proximity to deserts, agriculture, industry, and roads, as these are likely to be sources of airborne particles. If a location is close to a source of airborne particles, the risk of soiling losses is high.

The soiling rate (see definition below) varies from season to season and from location to location, but is typically between 0%/day and 1%/day. However, average deposition rates as high as 2.5%/day have been observed for conventional photovoltaics in China. For concentrated solar power, soiling rates as high 5%/day have been observed. In regions with high soiling rates, soiling can become a significant contributor to power losses. As an extreme example, the total losses due to soiling of a photovoltaic system in the city of Helwan (Egypt) were observed to reach 66% at one point. The soiling in Helwan was attributed to dust from a nearby desert and local industry pollution. Several initiatives to map out the soiling risk of different regions of the world exist.

Soiling losses also depend on meteorological parameters such as rain, temperature, wind, humidity, and cloud cover. The most important meteorological factor is the average frequency of rain, since rain can wash soiling off of the solar panels/mirrors. If there is consistent rain throughout the whole year at a given site, the soiling losses are likely to be small. However, light rain and dew can also lead to increased particle adhesion, increasing the soiling losses. Some climates are favorable for the growth of biological soiling, but it is not known what the decisive factors are. The dependence of soiling on climate and weather is a complex matter. As of 2019, it is not possible to accurately predict soiling rates based on meteorological parameters.

=== Quantifying soiling losses ===
The level of soiling in a photovoltaic system can be expressed with the soiling ratio (SR), defined in the technical standard IEC 61724-1 as:

$$SR = \frac{\text{Actual power output}}{\text{Expected power output if clean}}.$$

Hence, if $SR = 1$ there is no soiling, and if $SR = 0$, there is so much soiling that there is no production in the photovoltaic system. An alternative metric is the soiling loss (SL), which is defined as $SL = 1-SR$. The soiling loss represents the fraction of energy lost due to soiling.

The soiling deposition rate (or soiling rate) is the rate of change of the soiling loss, typically given in %/day. Note that most sources define the soiling rate to be positive in the case of increasing soiling losses' but some sources use the opposite sign[NREL].

=== Soiling measurement ===
A procedure for measuring the soiling ratio at photovoltaic systems is given in IEC 61724-1. This standard proposes that two photovoltaic devices are used, where one is left to accumulate soil, and the other is held clean. The soiling ratio is estimated by the ratio of the power output of the soiled device to its expected power output if it was clean. The expected power output is calculated using calibration values and the measured short-circuit current of the clean device. This setup is also referred to as a "soiling measurement station", or just "soiling station".

In addition to this electrical comparison method, IEC 61724-1 (Section 9.4: Soiling ratio measurement) also describes an optical soiling measurement approach, where the attenuation of light passing through a reference glass or optical sensor is monitored to determine the soiling ratio. In this method, the reduction in optical transmittance due to accumulated soil or particles is correlated to the expected power loss on photovoltaic modules.

Methods that estimate soiling ratios and soiling deposition rates of photovoltaic systems without the use of dedicated soiling stations have been proposed, including methods for systems using bifacial solar cells which introduce new variables and challenges to soiling estimation that monofacial systems don't have. These procedures infer soiling ratios based on the performance of the photovoltaic systems. A project for mapping out the soiling losses throughout the United States was started in 2017. This project is based on data from both soiling stations and photovoltaic systems, and uses the method proposed in to extract soiling ratios and soiling rates.

==== Soiling sensors ====
Soiling sensors are used in photovoltaic power plants to monitor the accumulation of soil and dust on module surfaces, which directly affects energy yield and helps determine optimal cleaning intervals. These sensors operate based on principles defined in IEC 61724-1, including the guidelines summarized in Annex C, and provide continuous data to evaluate performance losses caused by soiling on photovoltaic panels. Depending on specific site conditions, operational goals, and available budgets, various types of soiling sensors have been developed to meet different application needs.

===== Manual soiling sensors =====
Manual soiling sensors are designed for simple and cost-efficient monitoring of soil accumulation in photovoltaic systems. They typically employ two reference solar cells—one kept clean through manual wiping and another left to accumulate soil naturally. By comparing the electrical outputs of these cells at regular intervals, system operators can quantify the degree of soiling and schedule appropriate cleaning activities. Such sensors are often preferred for small-scale installations, pilot projects, or academic research sites where manual maintenance is feasible and automation is not required.

===== Automatic soiling sensors =====
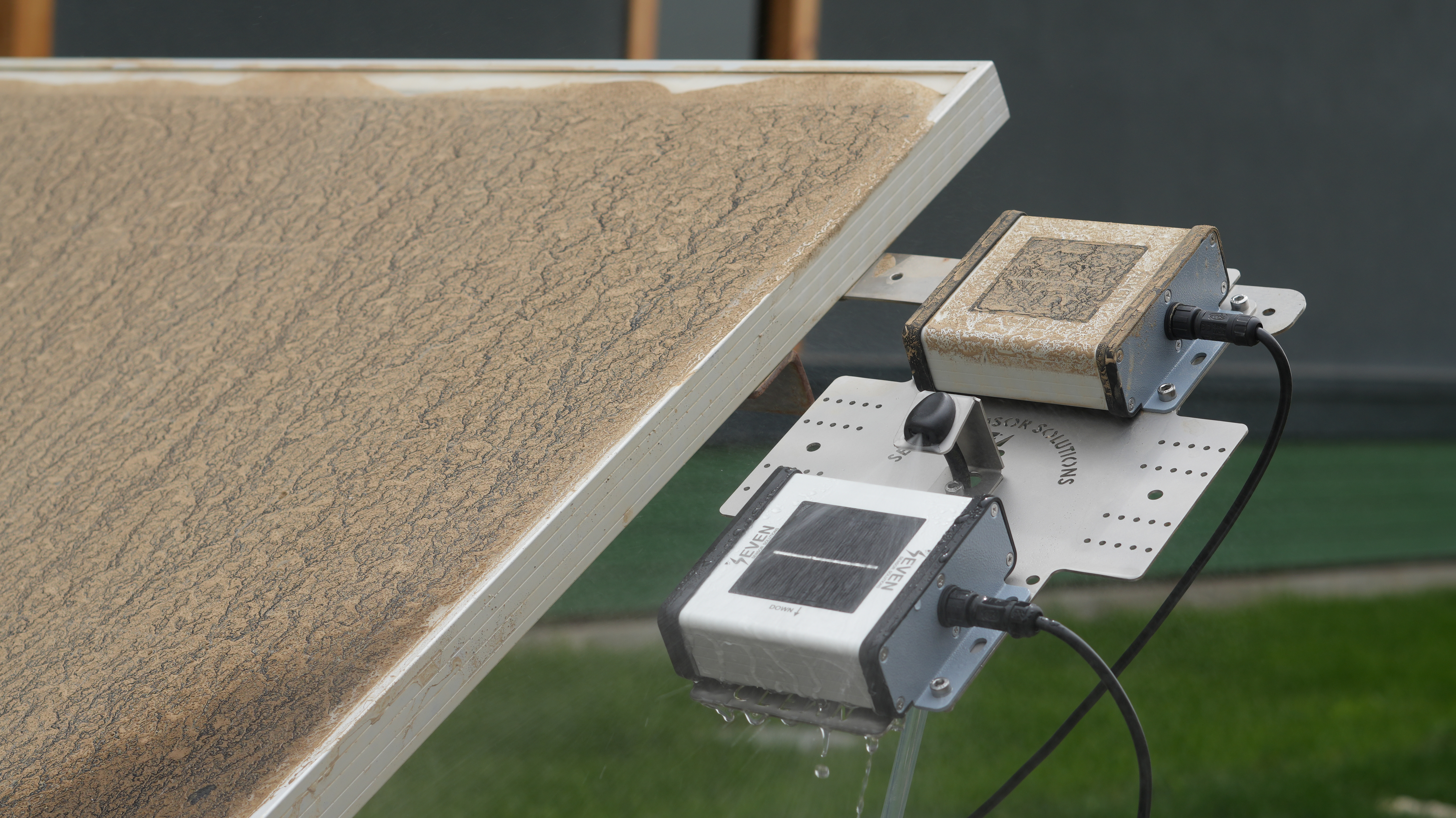
An automatic soiling sensor used to measure the soiling rate on photovoltaic modules.

Automatic soiling sensors work on the same comparative principle but integrate self-cleaning mechanisms that keep one of the reference cells consistently clean. Cleaning can be achieved using automated brushes, air-jet systems, or hydrophobic surfaces that minimize soil adhesion. These sensors enable long-term, unattended operation and provide more reliable, continuous data for assessing performance losses due to soiling. They are widely used in large or remote photovoltaic plants where manual cleaning is difficult or costly, supporting predictive maintenance strategies and optimization of cleaning intervals.

===== Portable soiling sensors =====
A portable soiling sensor used to measure the soiling rate on photovoltaic surfaces.

Portable soiling sensors are compact devices that allow for temporary or mobile deployment at various photovoltaic sites. Rather than offering continuous measurements at a fixed location, these instruments are used to evaluate soiling rates across different regions or installation types. In addition to electrical comparison–based approaches, many portable systems also make use of the optical attenuation method described in IEC 61724-1, where the reduction in light transmittance through a reference glass surface is measured to estimate the soiling ratio. Their portability makes them particularly useful for research and feasibility studies, enabling operators to assess local environmental impacts and determine suitable cleaning schedules without installing permanent monitoring infrastructure.

== Mitigation techniques ==
There are many different options for mitigating soiling losses, ranging from site selection to cleaning to electrodynamic dust removal. The optimal mitigation technique depends on soiling type, deposition rate, water availability, accessibility of the site, and system type. For instance, conventional photovoltaics involve different concerns than concentrated solar power, large-scale systems call for different concerns than smaller rooftop systems, and systems with fixed inclination involve different concerns than systems with solar trackers. The most common mitigation techniques are:

- Site selection and system design: The effect of soiling can be mitigated by careful planning during site selection and system design. Within a region, there may be large differences in soiling deposition rates. The local variability in soiling deposition rate is mainly decided by the proximity to roads, agriculture, and industry, as well as the prominent wind direction. Another important factor is the inclination angle of the solar panels. Larger inclination angles lead to less soiling accumulation and a higher likelihood of rain having a cleaning effect. This should be considered in the design phase. If the system is equipped with solar trackers, the solar panels (or mirrors, in the case of concentrated solar power) should be stowed at the maximum inclination angle (or upside down, if possible) during the night. In summary, soiling is a concern for the system designers, not only the system operators.
- Solar panel design: Solar panels can be designed to minimize the impact of soiling. This includes the use of smaller solar cells (e.g. half-cells), panels without frames (avoiding dirt collection at the edges), or alternative electrical configurations (e.g. more bypass diodes that allow current to pass the soiled parts of the panel). In the future, the fraction of solar panels with half-cells and without frames are expected to increase.

This means one can expect solar panels to be more resistant to soiling losses in the future.
Wet-chemically etched nanowires and a hydrophobic coating on the surface water droplets was shown to be able to remove 98% of dust particles.

- Cleaning: The most used approach to mitigate soiling losses is by cleaning the solar panels/mirrors. Cleaning can be manual, semi-automatic, or fully automatic. Manual cleaning involves people using brushes or mops. This requires a low capital investment, but it has a high cost of labor. Semi-automatic cleaning involves people using machines to aid the cleaning, typically a tractor equipped with a rotating brush.

This approach requires a higher capital investment, but involves lower cost of labor than manual cleaning. Fully automatic cleaning involves the use of robots that clean the solar panels at night.
This approach requires the highest capital cost, but involves no manual labor except for maintenance of the robots. All three methods may or may not use water. Typically, water makes the cleaning more efficient. However, if water is a scarce or expensive resource at the given site, dry cleaning may be preferred. See Economic consequences for typical costs of cleaning.

- Anti-soiling coatings: Anti-soiling coatings are coverings that are applied to the surface of solar panels or mirrors in order to reduce the adhesion of dust and dirt. Some anti-soiling coatings are meant to enhance the self-cleaning properties, i.e. the probability that the surface will be cleaned by rain.

The coating can be applied to the panels/mirrors during production or retrofitted after they have been installed. As of 2019, no particular anti-soiling technology had been widely adopted, mostly due to a lack of durability.

- Electrodynamic screens: Electrodynamic screens are grids of conducting wires that are integrated in the surface of the solar panels or mirrors. Time-varying electromagnetic fields are set up by applying alternating voltages to the grid. The field interacts with the deposited particles, moving them off the surface. This technology is viable if the energy needed to remove the dust is smaller than the energy gained by lowering the soiling loss. As of 2019, this technology has been demonstrated in the lab, but it still remains to be proven in the field.
- Electrostatic dust removal

=== Economic consequences ===
The cost of cleaning depends on what cleaning technique is used and the labor cost at the given location. Furthermore, there is a difference between large-scale power station and rooftop systems. The cost of cleaning of large-scale systems vary from 0.015 euro/m^{2} in the cheapest countries to 0.9 euro/m^{2} in the Netherlands. The cost of cleaning of rooftop systems have been reported to be as low as 0.06 euro/m^{2} in China, and as high as eight euro/m^{2} in the Netherlands.

Soiling leads to reduced power production in the affected solar power equipment. Whether or not money is spent on mitigating soiling losses, soiling leads to reduced revenue for the system owners. The magnitude of the revenue loss depends mostly on the cost of soiling mitigation, the soiling deposition rate, and the frequency of rain at the given location. Ilse et al. estimated the global average annual soiling loss between 3% and 4% in 2018. This estimate assumes all solar power systems are cleaned with an optimal fixed frequency. Based on this estimate, the total cost of soiling (including power losses and mitigation costs) in 2018 was estimated to be between 3 and 5 billion euros. This could grow to between 4 and 7 billion euros by 2023. A method to obtain the power loss, energy loss and economic loss due to soiling directly from PV remote monitoring system time-series data has been discussed in which can help the PV asset owners to clean the panels timely.

== See also ==
- Solar energy
- Photovoltaic system performance
- Solar tracker
- Heliostat
